= Canavese =

Canavese Canavèis
- Traditional region
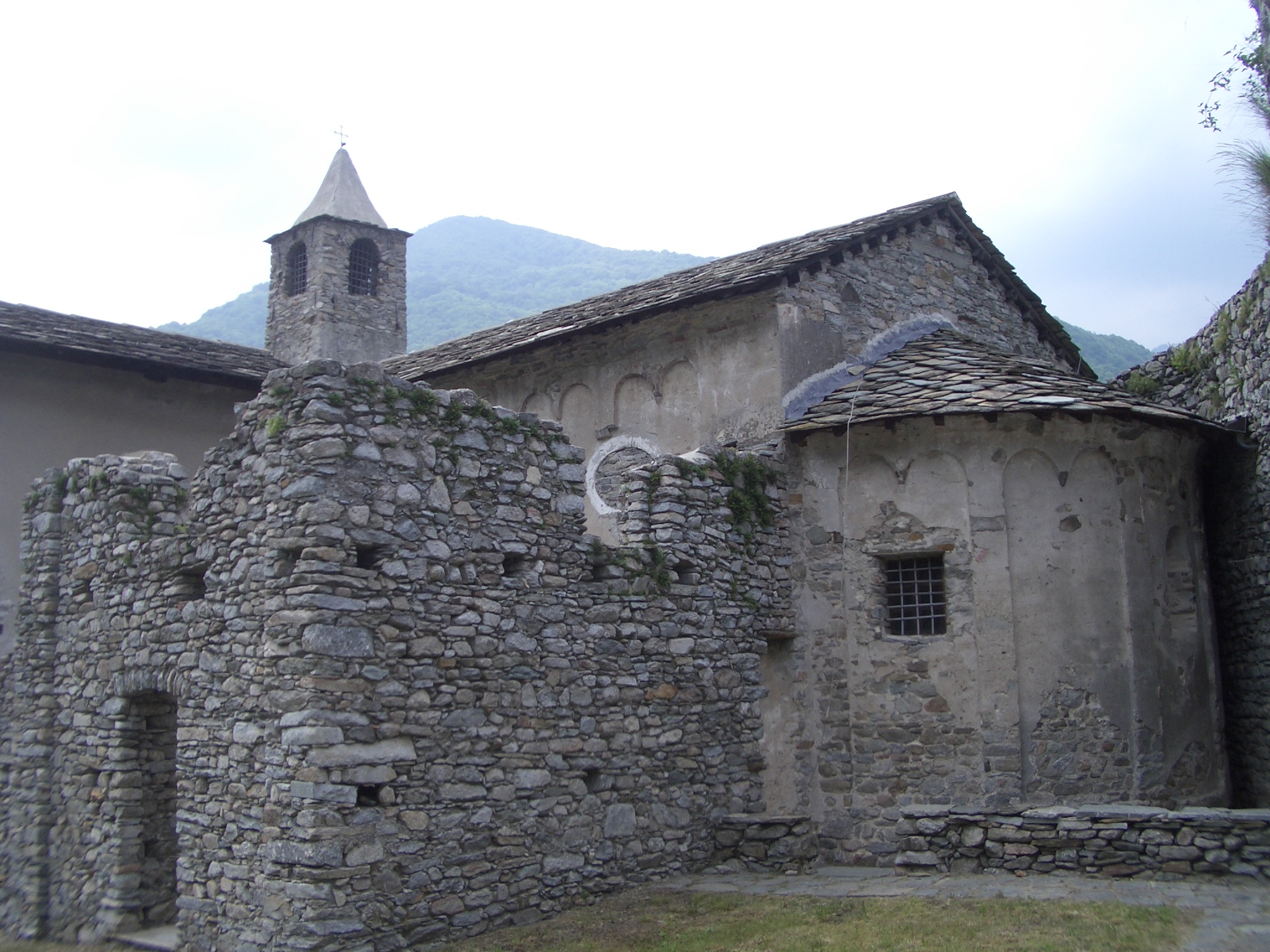
- Church of Santa Croce at Sparone

- Coat of arms

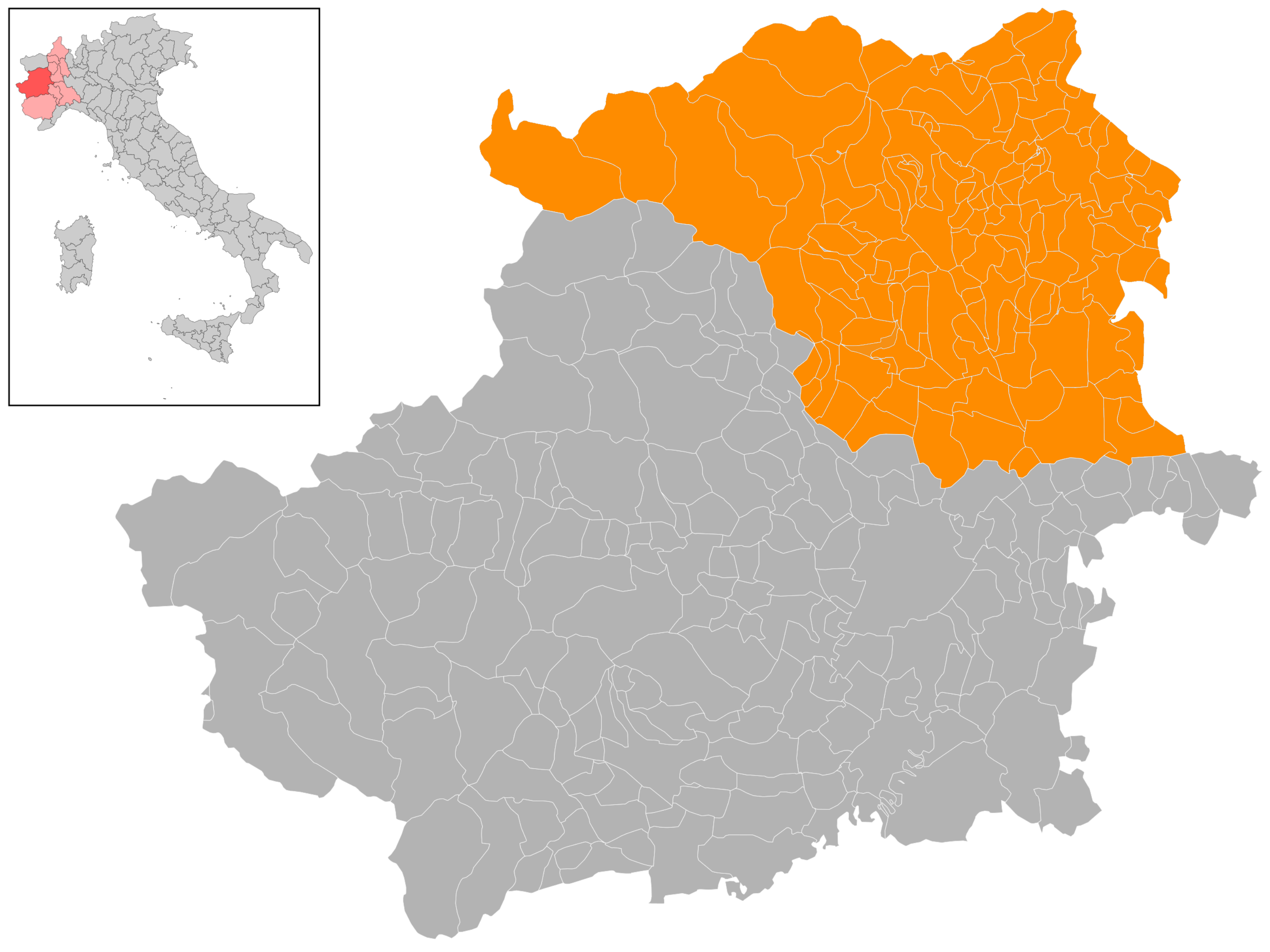
- Country: Italy
- Elevation: 300 m (980 ft)

Canavese (French: Canavais; Piedmontese: Canavèis) is a subalpine geographical and historical area of North-West Italy which lies today within the Metropolitan City of Turin in Piedmont. Its main town is Ivrea and it is famous for its castles.

== Location ==
To the North it borders on the Aosta Valley and to the East on the provinces of Biella and Vercelli. To the South and West the borders have varied over time but might be taken as being the rivers Stura di Lanzo and Po. The valley of the river Orco and the area around Corio fall within the Canavese. Turin, however, is entirely excluded.

The main centres, in addition to Ivrea, are Caluso, Chivasso, Cirié, Cuorgnè and Rivarolo Canavese.

=== List of places in Canavese ===
- Agliè
- Albiano d'Ivrea
- Alpette
- Andrate
- Azeglio
- Bairo
- Baldissero Canavese
- Banchette
- Barbania
- Barone Canavese
- Bollengo
- Borgiallo
- Borgofranco d'Ivrea
- Borgomasino
- Bosconero
- Brandizzo
- Brosso
- Burolo
- Busano
- Caluso
- Candia Canavese
- Canischio
- Caravino
- Carema
- Cascinette d'Ivrea
- Castellamonte
- Castelnuovo Nigra
- Ceresole Reale
- Chiaverano
- Chiesanuova
- Chivasso
- Ciconio
- Cintano
- Cirié
- Colleretto Castelnuovo
- Colleretto Giacosa
- Corio
- Cossano Canavese
- Cuceglio
- Cuorgnè
- Favria
- Feletto
- Fiorano Canavese
- Foglizzo
- Forno Canavese
- Frassinetto
- Front
- Grosso
- Ingria
- Issiglio
- Ivrea
- Leinì
- Lessolo
- Levone
- Locana
- Lombardore
- Loranzè
- Lusigliè
- Maglione
- Mathi
- Mazzè
- Mercenasco
- Moncrivello
- Montalenghe
- Montalto Dora
- Montanaro
- Noasca
- Nole
- Nomaglio
- Oglianico
- Orio Canavese
- Ozegna
- Palazzo Canavese
- Parella
- Pavone Canavese
- Perosa Canavese
- Pertusio
- Piverone
- Pont Canavese
- Prascorsano
- Pratiglione
- Quagliuzzo
- Quassolo
- Quincinetto
- Ribordone
- Rivara
- Rivarolo Canavese
- Rivarossa
- Rocca Canavese
- Romano Canavese
- Ronco Canavese
- Rondissone
- Roppolo
- Rueglio
- Salassa
- Salerano Canavese
- Samone
- San Benigno Canavese
- San Carlo Canavese
- San Colombano Belmonte
- San Francesco al Campo
- San Giorgio Canavese
- San Giusto Canavese
- San Martino Canavese
- San Maurizio Canavese
- San Ponso
- Scarmagno
- Settimo Rottaro
- Settimo Vittone
- Sparone
- Strambinello
- Strambino
- Tavagnasco
- Torrazza Piemonte
- Torre Canavese
- Traversella
- Valchiusa
- Val di Chy
- Valperga
- Valprato Soana
- Vauda Canavese
- Verolengo
- Vestignè
- Vialfrè
- Vidracco
- Villanova Canavese
- Villareggia
- Vische
- Vistrorio
- Viverone
- Volpiano

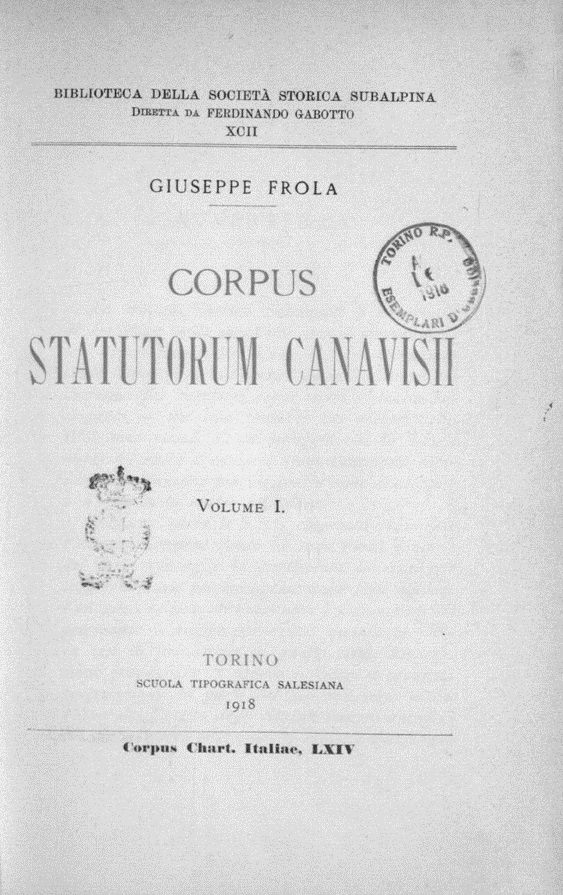
Giuseppe Frola, Corpus Statutorum Canavisii, 1918. Collection of ancient statutes from Canavese.

== History ==
The first inhabitants of Canavese were the Salassi, a tribe of Celto-Ligurian roots; the Romans arrived in 22 BCE.

When the Roman Empire fell, Canavese fell under the domination of Byzantium. It was then conquered by Lombards and later by Franks.

After the death of Arduino, marquis of Ivrea and the first to bear the title of king of Italy (1015), the Counts of Canavese part of the House of Ivrea (who all claimed to be his descendants) shared out the region. This was the beginning of the big families of Canavese: San Martino, Valperga, de Candia, Castellamonte, and later the Biandrate family from Novara.

The House of Savoy started its political expansion in Canavese in the 14th century, and the Commune of Ivrea as well as the Canavese Counts became their subjects.

In the 16th century, Canavese came under French domination, then Spanish domination, then back to French domination. Napoleon's defeat in 1814 returned Canavese under the House of Savoy.

== Main sights ==
- Sacro Monte di Belmonte
- House of King Arduin at Cuorgnè
- Cathedral and Church of St. Bernardino at Ivrea
- Fruttuaria Abbey

Canavese is also home to numerous castles of medieval origin, such as those Ivrea Castle, Parella Castle, Malgrà Castle, Agliè Castle, Candia Canavese Castle, and others.

== See also ==
- Ivrea Morainic Amphitheatre
