= List of municipalities of the Metropolitan City of Turin =

This is a list of the 312 municipalities (comuni) of the Metropolitan City of Turin in the region of Piedmont in Italy.

== List ==
Municipality	Population (2026)	Area (km²)	Density
Agliè	2,584	13.15	196.5
Airasca	3,698	15.74	234.9
Ala di Stura	468	46.33	10.1
Albiano d'Ivrea	1,633	11.73	139.2
Almese	6,231	17.88	348.5
Alpette	235	5.63	41.7
Alpignano	16,513	11.92	1,385.3
Andezeno	1,979	7.49	264.2
Andrate	468	9.31	50.3
Angrogna	794	38.88	20.4
Arignano	1,076	8.17	131.7
Avigliana	12,035	23.22	518.3
Azeglio	1,224	9.96	122.9
Bairo	778	7.09	109.7
Balangero	3,095	13.01	237.9
Baldissero Canavese	493	4.51	109.3
Baldissero Torinese	3,692	15.41	239.6
Balme	97	62.71	1.5
Banchette	3,097	2.03	1,525.6
Barbania	1,563	12.80	122.1
Bardonecchia	2,853	132.20	21.6
Barone Canavese	525	3.99	131.6
Beinasco	17,272	6.73	2,566.4
Bibiana	3,362	18.60	180.8
Bobbio Pellice	527	94.08	5.6
Bollengo	2,099	14.22	147.6
Borgaro Torinese	11,523	11.10	1,038.1
Borgiallo	587	6.96	84.3
Borgofranco d'Ivrea	3,424	13.42	255.1
Borgomasino	770	12.37	62.2
Borgone Susa	2,250	4.96	453.6
Bosconero	3,044	10.92	278.8
Brandizzo	8,772	6.29	1,394.6
Bricherasio	4,611	22.76	202.6
Brosso	387	11.14	34.7
Brozolo	423	8.95	47.3
Bruino	8,364	5.57	1,501.6
Brusasco	1,495	14.36	104.1
Bruzolo	1,513	12.56	120.5
Buriasco	1,289	14.69	87.7
Burolo	1,095	5.48	199.8
Busano	1,578	5.06	311.9
Bussoleno	5,766	37.07	155.5
Buttigliera Alta	6,222	8.10	768.1
Cafasse	3,388	10.23	331.2
Caluso	7,338	39.49	185.8
Cambiano	5,884	14.13	416.4
Campiglione-Fenile	1,297	11.09	117.0
Candia Canavese	1,143	9.13	125.2
Candiolo	5,563	11.85	469.5
Canischio	269	11.95	22.5
Cantalupa	2,581	11.20	230.4
Cantoira	645	23.03	28.0
Caprie	2,014	16.41	122.7
Caravino	891	11.54	77.2
Carema	697	10.26	67.9
Carignano	9,250	50.68	182.5
Carmagnola	27,971	95.72	292.2
Casalborgone	1,865	20.13	92.6
Cascinette d'Ivrea	1,503	2.17	692.6
Caselette	3,024	14.31	211.3
Caselle Torinese	13,738	23.55	583.4
Castagneto Po	1,748	11.47	152.4
Castagnole Piemonte	2,168	17.28	125.5
Castellamonte	9,839	38.71	254.2
Castelnuovo Nigra	417	28.38	14.7
Castiglione Torinese	6,519	14.13	461.4
Cavagnolo	2,357	12.33	191.2
Cavour	5,373	48.96	109.7
Cercenasco	1,760	13.16	133.7
Ceres	957	28.05	34.1
Ceresole Reale	139	99.82	1.4
Cesana Torinese	887	121.70	7.3
Chialamberto	336	35.45	9.5
Chianocco	1,494	18.61	80.3
Chiaverano	1,958	12.02	162.9
Chieri	35,822	54.20	660.9
Chiesanuova	229	4.12	55.6
Chiomonte	838	26.76	31.3
Chiusa di San Michele	1,524	5.92	257.4
Chivasso	26,038	51.24	508.2
Ciconio	358	3.16	113.3
Cintano	225	4.93	45.6
Cinzano	340	6.20	54.8
Cirié	18,083	17.73	1,019.9
Claviere	199	2.69	74.0
Coassolo Torinese	1,460	27.88	52.4
Coazze	3,371	56.57	59.6
Collegno	47,590	18.10	2,629.3
Colleretto Castelnuovo	354	6.33	55.9
Colleretto Giacosa	576	4.59	125.5
Condove	4,422	71.11	62.2
Corio	3,106	41.49	74.9
Cossano Canavese	410	3.24	126.5
Cuceglio	917	6.87	133.5
Cumiana	7,814	60.73	128.7
Cuorgnè	9,483	19.31	491.1
Druento	8,942	27.54	324.7
Exilles	241	46.55	5.2
Favria	4,962	14.85	334.1
Feletto	2,151	7.89	272.6
Fenestrelle	466	49.41	9.4
Fiano	2,638	12.04	219.1
Fiorano Canavese	725	4.35	166.7
Foglizzo	2,278	15.64	145.7
Forno Canavese	3,152	16.50	191.0
Frassinetto	272	24.82	11.0
Front	1,590	10.95	145.2
Frossasco	2,846	20.15	141.2
Garzigliana	564	7.40	76.2
Gassino Torinese	9,208	20.51	449.0
Germagnano	1,131	14.44	78.3
Giaglione	585	33.38	17.5
Giaveno	16,361	71.74	228.1
Givoletto	4,060	12.82	316.7
Gravere	684	18.99	36.0
Groscavallo	183	92.09	2.0
Grosso	1,004	4.33	231.9
Grugliasco	36,410	13.13	2,773.0
Ingria	44	14.75	3.0
Inverso Pinasca	677	8.03	84.3
Isolabella	355	4.77	74.4
Issiglio	434	5.50	78.9
Ivrea	22,544	30.11	748.7
La Cassa	1,719	12.04	142.8
La Loggia	8,673	12.79	678.1
Lanzo Torinese	5,038	10.29	489.6
Lauriano	1,356	14.29	94.9
Leini	16,339	31.92	511.9
Lemie	153	45.68	3.3
Lessolo	1,748	7.94	220.2
Levone	476	5.39	88.3
Locana	1,280	132.52	9.7
Lombardore	1,735	12.72	136.4
Lombriasco	1,090	7.21	151.2
Loranzè	1,204	4.19	287.4
Luserna San Giovanni	7,118	17.74	401.2
Lusernetta	505	7.04	71.7
Lusigliè	554	5.26	105.3
Macello	1,180	14.14	83.5
Maglione	409	6.31	64.8
Mappano	7,280	9.76	745.9
Marentino	1,269	11.26	112.7
Massello	56	38.26	1.5
Mathi	3,674	7.07	519.7
Mattie	679	28.69	23.7
Mazzè	4,298	27.34	157.2
Meana di Susa	787	16.54	47.6
Mercenasco	1,355	12.64	107.2
Mezzenile	735	29.09	25.3
Mombello di Torino	399	4.08	97.8
Mompantero	612	30.33	20.2
Monastero di Lanzo	403	17.66	22.8
Moncalieri	55,442	47.53	1,166.5
Moncenisio	44	4.50	9.8
Montaldo Torinese	709	4.66	152.1
Montalenghe	966	6.47	149.3
Montalto Dora	3,307	7.36	449.3
Montanaro	4,974	20.90	238.0
Monteu da Po	824	7.39	111.5
Moriondo Torinese	823	6.49	126.8
Nichelino	45,680	20.56	2,221.8
Noasca	97	78.05	1.2
Nole	6,660	11.35	586.8
Nomaglio	275	3.07	89.6
None	7,641	24.64	310.1
Novalesa	525	28.55	18.4
Oglianico	1,419	6.30	225.2
Orbassano	22,779	22.21	1,025.6
Orio Canavese	730	7.15	102.1
Osasco	1,161	5.49	211.5
Osasio	896	4.58	195.6
Oulx	3,295	99.79	33.0
Ozegna	1,164	5.41	215.2
Palazzo Canavese	834	5.08	164.2
Pancalieri	1,945	15.89	122.4
Parella	394	2.69	146.5
Pavarolo	1,165	4.41	264.2
Pavone Canavese	3,628	11.54	314.4
Pecetto Torinese	4,007	9.17	437.0
Perosa Argentina	3,138	26.09	120.3
Perosa Canavese	492	4.71	104.5
Perrero	547	63.18	8.7
Pertusio	744	4.00	186.0
Pessinetto	612	5.35	114.4
Pianezza	15,657	16.46	951.2
Pinasca	2,756	34.72	79.4
Pinerolo	35,436	50.34	703.9
Pino Torinese	8,336	21.82	382.0
Piobesi Torinese	3,764	19.65	191.6
Piossasco	17,844	40.15	444.4
Piscina	3,288	9.90	332.1
Piverone	1,224	11.03	111.0
Poirino	10,165	75.62	134.4
Pomaretto	935	8.56	109.2
Pont-Canavese	3,017	19.06	158.3
Porte	1,113	4.45	250.1
Pragelato	694	89.20	7.8
Prali	251	72.61	3.5
Pralormo	1,872	29.85	62.7
Pramollo	211	22.48	9.4
Prarostino	1,238	10.51	117.8
Prascorsano	686	6.24	109.9
Pratiglione	444	7.88	56.3
Quagliuzzo	333	2.04	163.2
Quassolo	329	3.96	83.1
Quincinetto	991	17.79	55.7
Reano	1,779	6.67	266.7
Ribordone	43	43.60	1.0
Riva presso Chieri	4,756	35.83	132.7
Rivalba	1,135	10.83	104.8
Rivalta di Torino	20,019	25.11	797.3
Rivara	2,421	12.58	192.4
Rivarolo Canavese	12,303	32.25	381.5
Rivarossa	1,550	10.87	142.6
Rivoli	46,551	29.50	1,578.0
Robassomero	3,056	8.58	356.2
Rocca Canavese	1,727	14.19	121.7
Roletto	1,965	9.70	202.6
Romano Canavese	2,711	11.21	241.8
Ronco Canavese	383	96.27	4.0
Rondissone	1,927	10.69	180.3
Rorà	216	12.41	17.4
Rosta	5,074	9.07	559.4
Roure	740	59.37	12.5
Rubiana	2,591	26.94	96.2
Rueglio	788	15.10	52.2
Salassa	1,850	4.95	373.7
Salbertrand	635	38.32	16.6
Salerano Canavese	471	2.10	224.3
Salza di Pinerolo	65	15.89	4.1
Samone	1,538	2.43	632.9
San Benigno Canavese	6,050	22.23	272.2
San Carlo Canavese	4,029	20.91	192.7
San Colombano Belmonte	359	3.38	106.2
San Didero	493	3.30	149.4
San Francesco al Campo	4,805	14.98	320.8
San Germano Chisone	1,689	15.86	106.5
San Gillio	3,311	8.89	372.4
San Giorgio Canavese	2,484	20.41	121.7
San Giorio di Susa	951	19.74	48.2
San Giusto Canavese	3,309	9.61	344.3
San Martino Canavese	798	9.79	81.5
San Maurizio Canavese	10,252	17.34	591.2
San Mauro Torinese	18,267	12.55	1,455.5
San Pietro Val Lemina	1,437	12.44	115.5
San Ponso	230	2.12	108.5
San Raffaele Cimena	3,128	11.15	280.5
San Sebastiano da Po	1,853	16.58	111.8
San Secondo di Pinerolo	3,638	12.57	289.4
Sangano	3,624	6.65	545.0
Sant'Ambrogio di Torino	4,501	8.37	537.8
Sant'Antonino di Susa	4,073	9.79	416.0
Santena	10,373	16.20	640.3
Sauze d'Oulx	1,018	17.31	58.8
Sauze di Cesana	227	78.28	2.9
Scalenghe	3,199	31.68	101.0
Scarmagno	785	8.03	97.8
Sciolze	1,424	11.36	125.4
Sestriere	893	25.92	34.5
Settimo Rottaro	469	6.06	77.4
Settimo Torinese	45,566	31.45	1,448.8
Settimo Vittone	1,507	23.26	64.8
Sparone	903	29.68	30.4
Strambinello	236	2.21	106.8
Strambino	6,018	22.47	267.8
Susa	5,776	10.99	525.6
Tavagnasco	747	8.68	86.1
Torrazza Piemonte	2,997	9.82	305.2
Torre Canavese	597	5.45	109.5
Torre Pellice	4,585	21.10	217.3
Trana	3,744	16.41	228.2
Traversella	309	39.36	7.9
Traves	505	10.45	48.3
Trofarello	10,501	12.35	850.3
Turin	855,654	130.01	6,581.4
Usseaux	177	37.97	4.7
Usseglio	179	98.54	1.8
Vaie	1,317	7.23	182.2
Val della Torre	3,973	36.53	108.8
Val di Chy	1,225	13.83	88.6
Valchiusa	1,012	49.61	20.4
Valgioie	983	9.12	107.8
Vallo Torinese	784	6.08	128.9
Valperga	2,977	11.91	250.0
Valprato Soana	88	71.85	1.2
Varisella	828	22.56	36.7
Vauda Canavese	1,417	7.09	199.9
Venaria Reale	31,886	20.44	1,560.0
Venaus	843	19.14	44.0
Verolengo	4,788	29.49	162.4
Verrua Savoia	1,353	31.94	42.4
Vestignè	752	12.07	62.3
Vialfrè	258	4.65	55.5
Vidracco	450	2.97	151.5
Vigone	5,046	41.15	122.6
Villafranca Piemonte	4,585	50.79	90.3
Villanova Canavese	1,199	4.03	297.5
Villar Dora	2,793	5.71	489.1
Villar Focchiardo	1,943	25.69	75.6
Villar Pellice	1,052	60.29	17.4
Villar Perosa	3,892	11.42	340.8
Villarbasse	3,521	10.41	338.2
Villareggia	994	11.41	87.1
Villastellone	4,286	19.88	215.6
Vinovo	15,290	17.69	864.3
Virle Piemonte	1,188	14.06	84.5
Vische	1,206	17.08	70.6
Vistrorio	526	4.68	112.4
Viù	1,075	84.11	12.8
Volpiano	15,060	32.46	464.0
Volvera	8,417	20.98	401.2

== See also ==
- List of municipalities of Italy
