= Favria Castle =

- Castello di Favria
- Favria, Piedmont, Italy
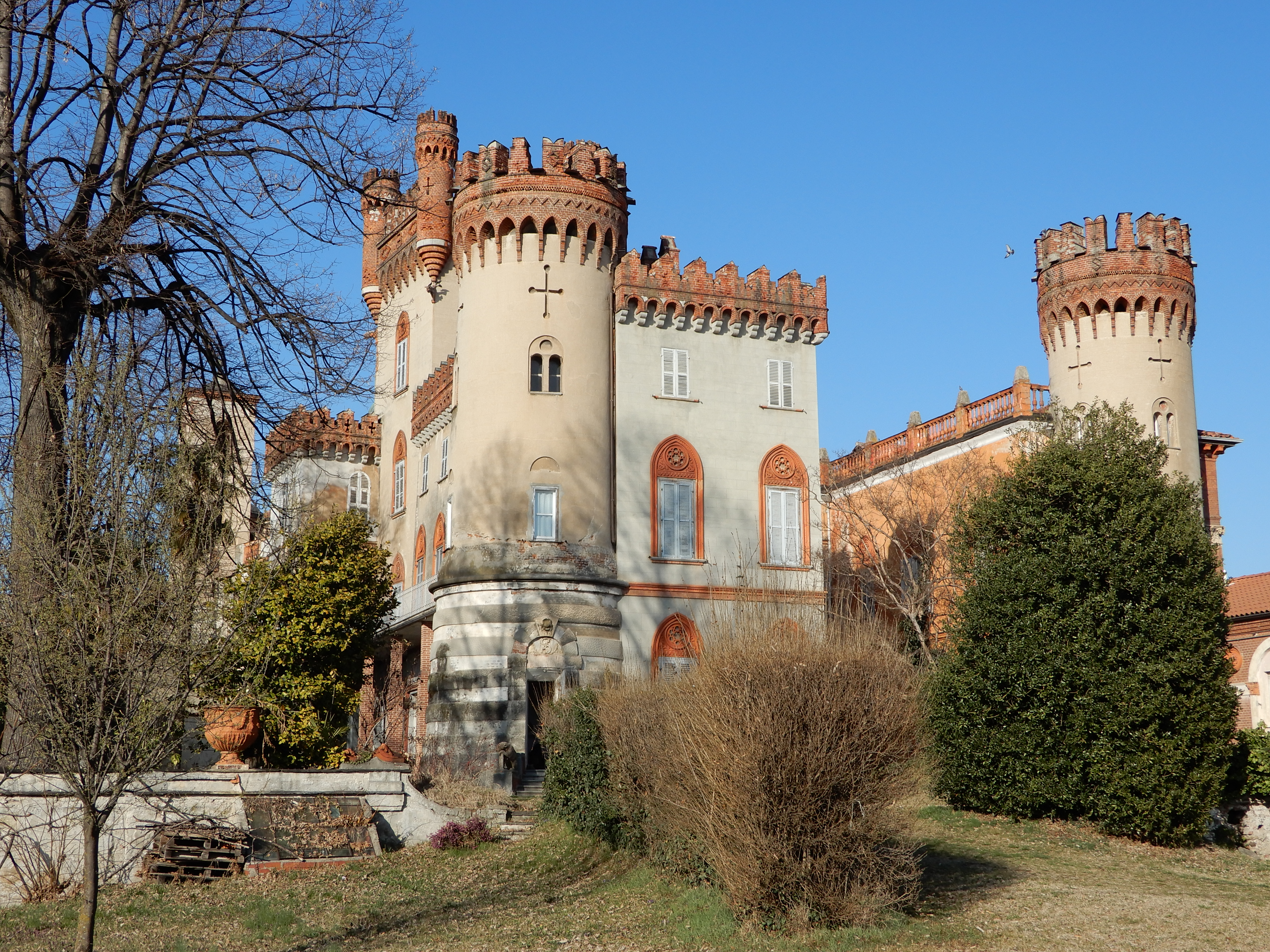
- Favria Castle

Site information
- Type: Castle

Location
- Coordinates: 45°19′54.07″N 7°41′24.26″E

Favria Castle (Italian: Castello di Favria) is a castle located in Favria, Piedmont, Italy.

== History ==
The castle dates back to the 12th century. It belonged for a long time to the Marquises of Montferrat, serving as protection of their domains. In 1446, William VIII, Marquis of Montferrat took steps towards the consolidation of the castle, giving impetus to the development of the settlement of Favria.

The property then belonged to the Solaro di Govone family, who transformed the castle into an elegant residence. The castle remains a private property today.

== Description ==
The castle is located in the center of the town of Favria and is surrounded by a large private garden.

== Gallery ==
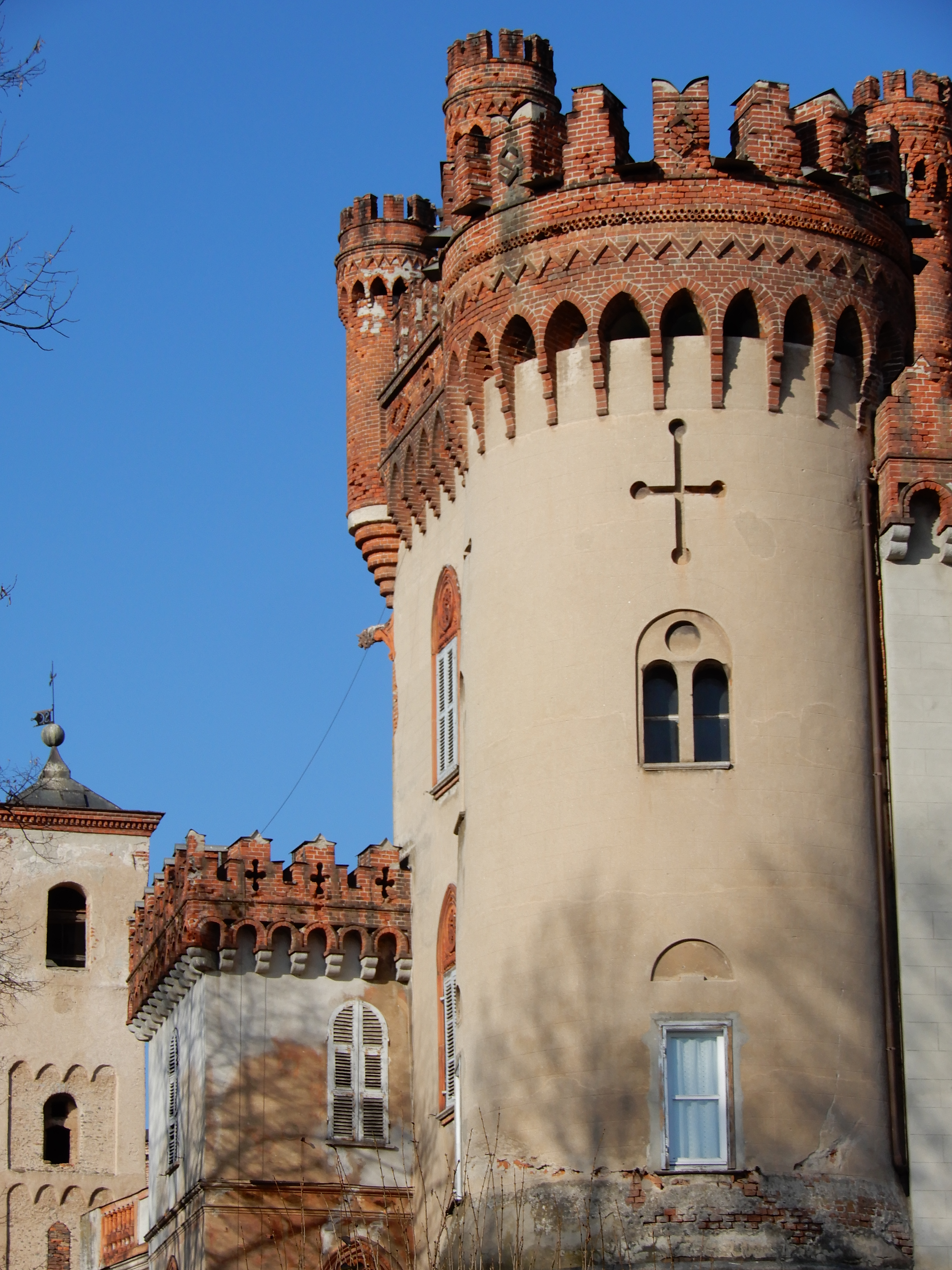

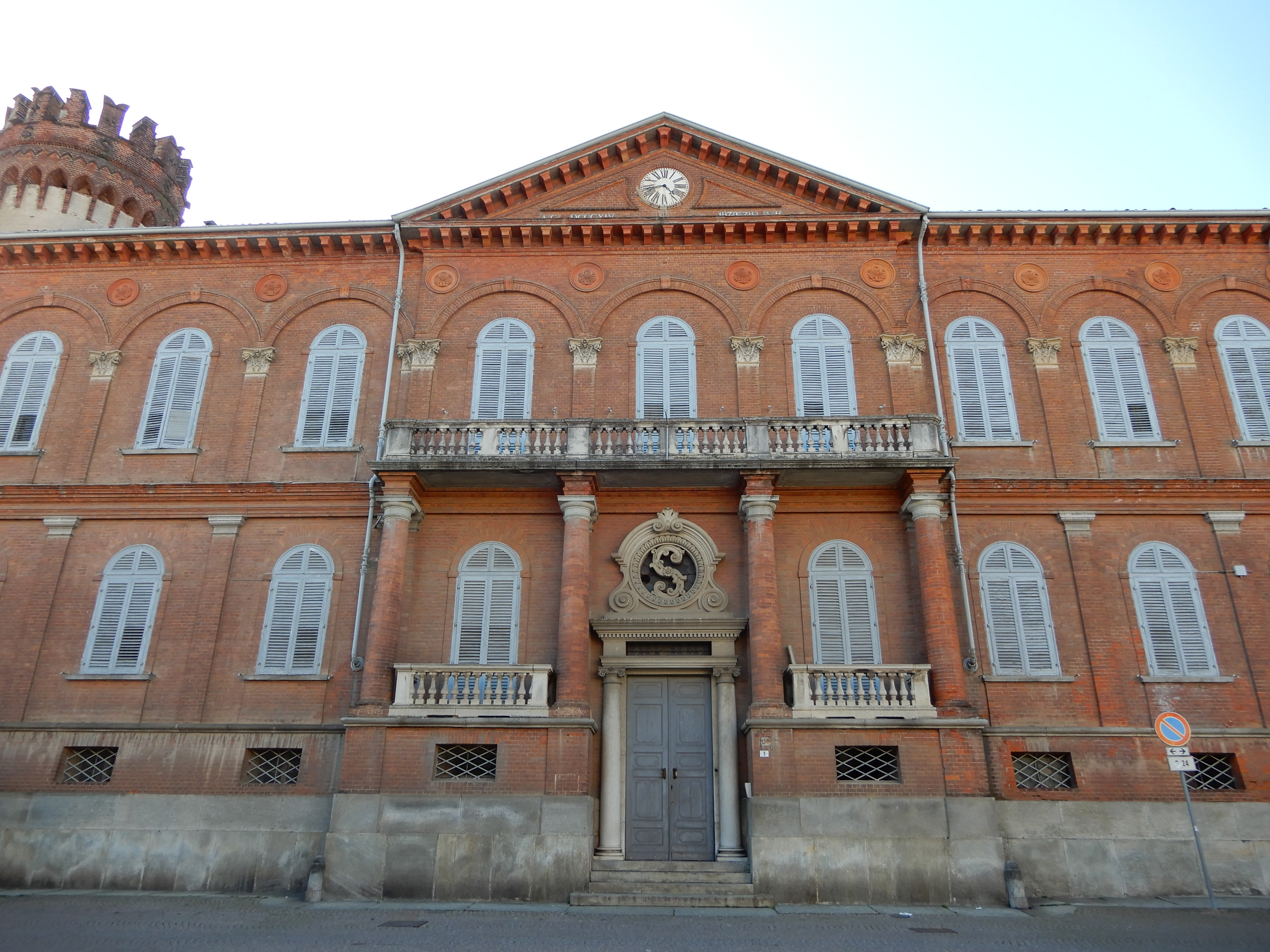

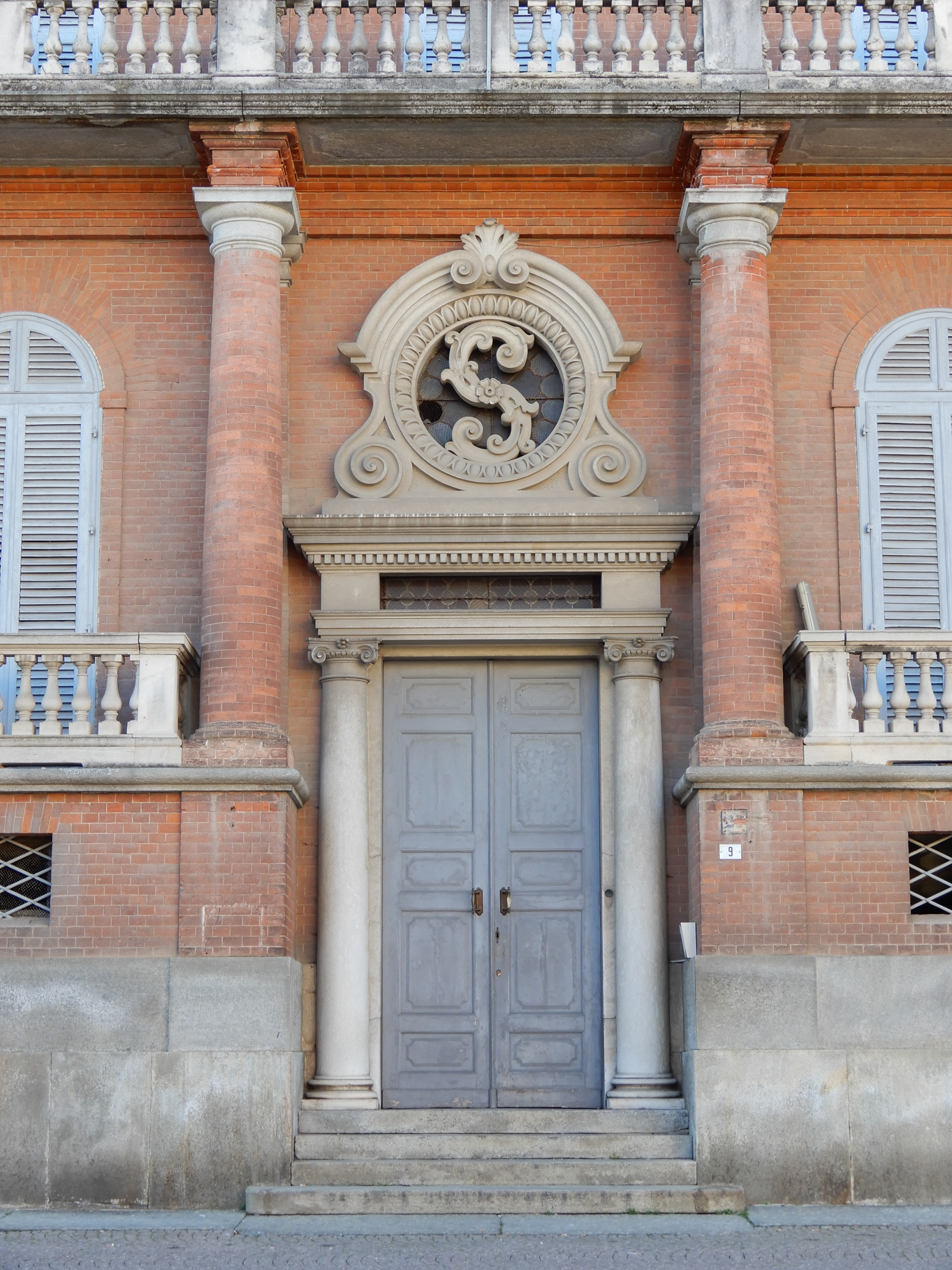
