= Colleretto =

Colleretto may refer to:

- Colleretto Castelnuovo, comune in the Metropolitan City of Turin in the Italian region of Piedmont
- Colleretto Giacosa, comune in the Metropolitan City of Turin in the Italian region of Piedmont
