= Rivarossa Castle =

- Castello di Rivarossa
- Rivarossa, Piedmont, Italy

Site information
- Type: Castle

Location
- Location in Italy
- Coordinates: 45°15′00.94″N 7°42′58.33″E

Rivarossa Castle (Italian: Castello di Rivarossa) is a castle located in Rivarossa, Piedmont, Italy.

== History ==
The origins of the castle are not precisely documented, but the existence feudal residence belonging to the Counts of Valperga is recorded as early as 1237. In the 16th century, following the Battle of Volpiano, the structure suffered significant damage. Over the centuries, the building underwent several modifications, including a major restoration in 1825 carried out by the Daziani family, who owned the estate at the time.

== Description ==
The castle retains elements of its original structure, including the defensive perimeter wall on the main façade. On the right side, a casemate is still visible, while beyond the walls stands a tower, on top of which an eclectic-style tribune was later built, creating a scenic belvedere.
