= Torrazza =

Torrazza may refer to:

- Torrazza, a former Italian municipality; now part of Imperia
- Torrazza Coste, an Italian town in the province of Pavia
- Torrazza Piemonte, an Italian town in the province of Turin
