= Front, Piedmont =

Front
- Comune
- Comune di Front
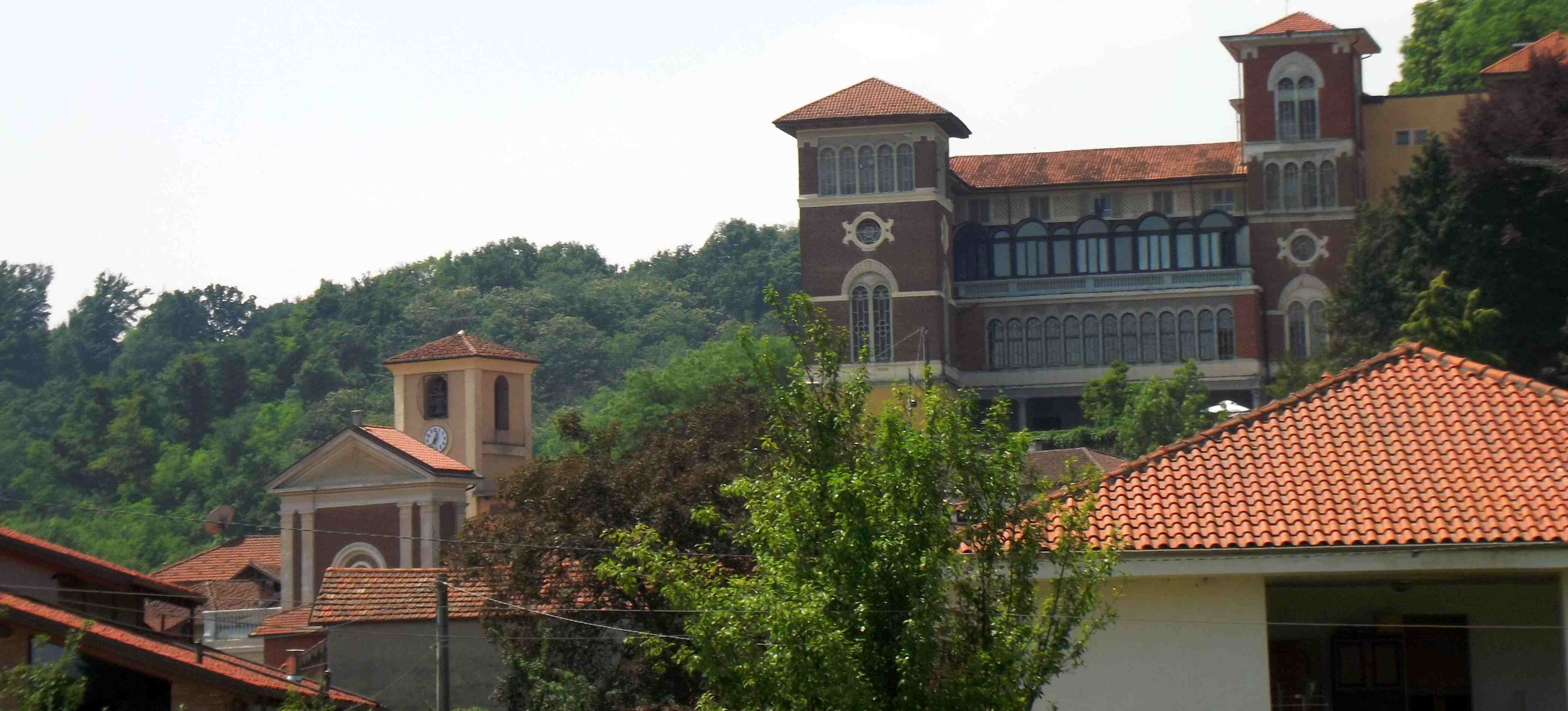
- Fandaglia creek from the SP34 bridge between Barbania and Front

- Coat of arms

- Location within Italy Location within Piedmont
- Coordinates: 45°17′N 7°40′E
- Country: Italy
- Region: Piedmont
- Metropolitan city: Turin (TO)
- Frazioni: Ceretti, Grange di Front

Government
  - Mayor: Andrea Perino (Lista civica)

Area
  - Total: 10.6 km^{2} (4.1 sq mi)
- Elevation: 270 m (890 ft)

Population (31 December 2010)
  - Total: 1,753
  - Density: 165/km^{2} (428/sq mi)
- Demonym: Frontesi
- Time zone: UTC+1 (CET)
  - Summer (DST): UTC+2 (CEST)
- Postal code: 10070
- Dialing code: 011

Front is a comune (municipality) in the Metropolitan City of Turin in the Italian region Piedmont, located about 25 kilometres (16 mi) north of Turin.

Front borders the following municipalities: Busano, Favria, Vauda Canavese, Oglianico, San Carlo Canavese, Rivarossa, and San Francesco al Campo.
