= Giuseppe Frola =

Italian historian and jurist (1883–1917)

Giuseppe Frola (January 5, 1883, Turin – July 28, 1917, Turin) was an Italian historian and jurist.

== Biography ==
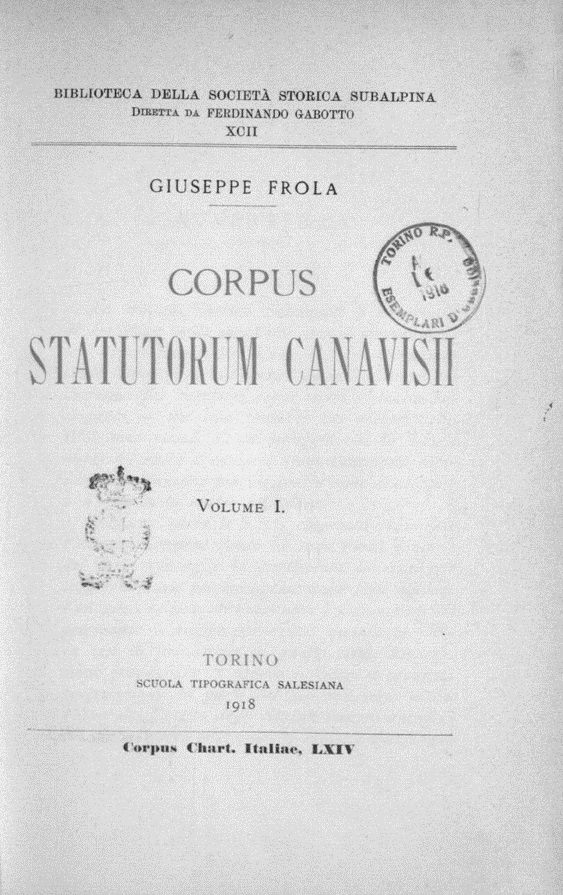
Corpus Statutorum Canavisii, 1918

Giuseppe Frola was born on January 5, 1883, in Turin. He was the son of Secondo Frola, a politician and civil lawyer; and Luisa Balbis, a noble piedmontese. He studied at the University of Turin, in the School of Law, where he graduated with honors by working with Francesco Ruffini on a thesis that dealt with Canavese statutes, a subject that would later also be covered in several articles published in Ferdinando Gabotto's journal.

He devoted his activity, in this early stage, mainly to historical and historical-legal research particularly related to the Canavese and the statutes found in the various communities in the area. It was from these pieces of researches that he hypothesized a publication on the history of the statutes of the Canavese communities based on archival and library documents, including numerous manuscripts, which took him to Rome where he frequented the intellectual circles of the capital. His research was published posthumously in 1918, under the title Corpus statutorum Canavisii. This collection of considerable historical interest "offers valuable study material for the knowledge of the local legal discipline and for the most diverse testimonies of life and the rural society of a homogeneous territorial area such as Canavese between the late Middle Ages and the early modern age".

In addition to historical research, Giuseppe Frola, in 1906, became involved in the enhancement of Artistic and Archaeological Assets, taking on the role of secretary of the Society of Archaeology and Fine Arts for the Province of Turin, and then in 1911, he participated in the Piedmont Committee for the International Exhibition. He died in Turin on July 28, 1917.

== Works ==
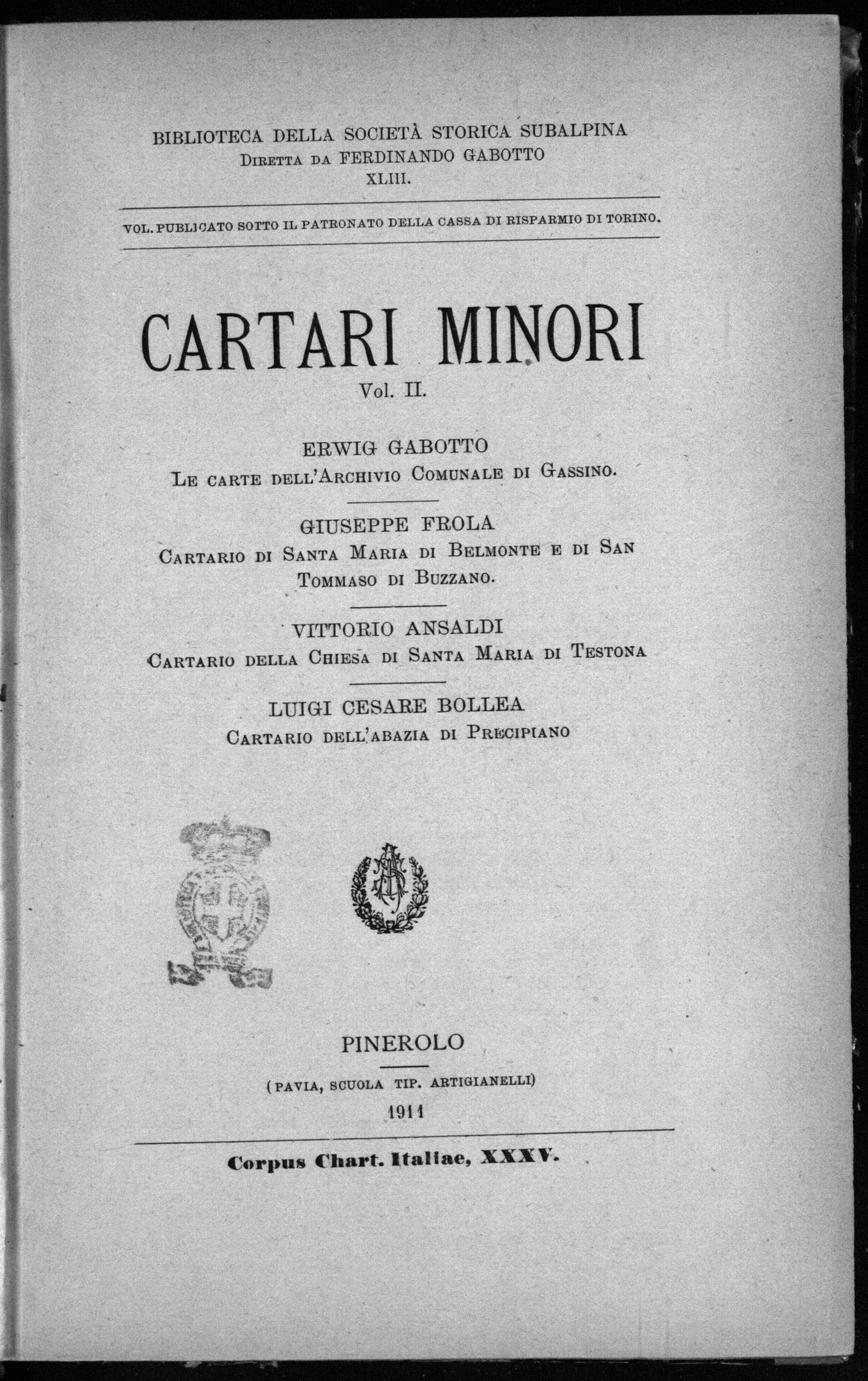
Documents from Archivio comunale di Gassino, 1911

Giuseppe Frola's works published in the collection Biblioteca della Società Storica Subalpina:

- Corpus Statutorum Canavisii (in Latin). Vol. 1. Torino: Scuola Tipografica Salesiana. 1918.
- Corpus Statutorum Canavisii (in Latin). Vol. 2. Torino: Scuola Tipografica Salesiana. 1918.
- Corpus Statutorum Canavisii (in Latin). Vol. 3. Torino: Scuola Tipografica Salesiana. 1918.
- "Cartario di Santa Maria di Belmonte e di San Tommaso di Buzzano". Cartari minori. Pinerolo. 1911.

== See also ==
- Secondo Frola

== Bibliography ==
- Gian Savino Pene Vidari (1998). "Frola, Giuseppe". Dizionario Biografico degli Italiani (in Italian). Vol. 50: Francesco 1. Sforza–Gabbi. Rome: Istituto dell'Enciclopedia Italiana. ISBN 978-88-12-00032-6.

== Other projects ==
- Wikisource contains a website dedicated to Giuseppe Frola (in Italian)
- Wikimedia Commons contains images or other files on Giuseppe Frola (in Italian)
