= Busano =

- Comune
- Comune di Busano
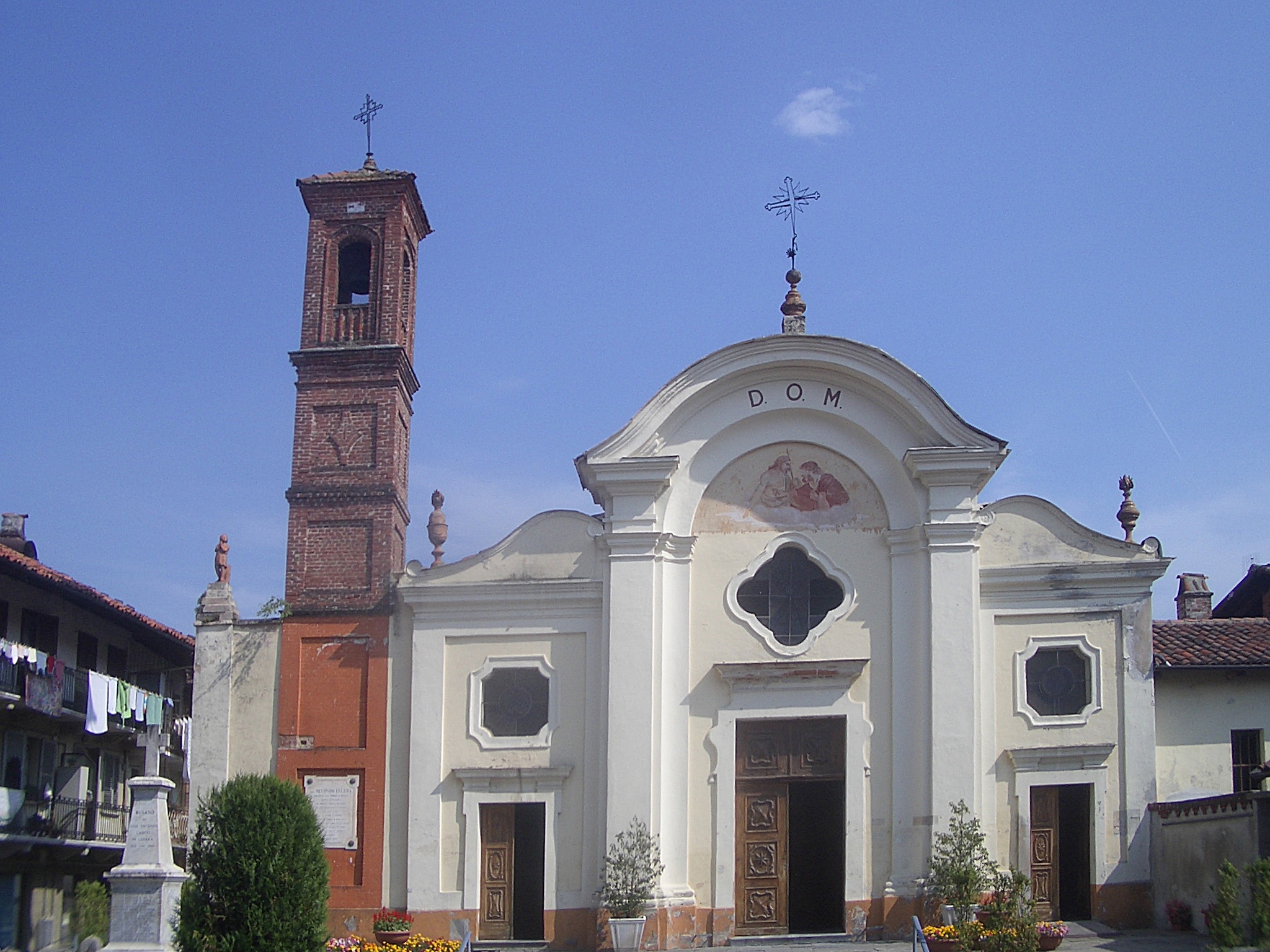

- Location within Italy Location within Piedmont
- Coordinates: 45°20′N 7°39′E
- Country: Italy
- Region: Piedmont
- Metropolitan city: Turin (TO)
- Frazioni: Pomata, Grangiasa

Government
  - Mayor: Gianbattistino Chiono

Area
  - Total: 5.06 km^{2} (1.95 sq mi)
- Elevation: 317 m (1,040 ft)

Population (1-1-2017)
  - Total: 1,658
  - Density: 328/km^{2} (849/sq mi)
- Time zone: UTC+1 (CET)
  - Summer (DST): UTC+2 (CEST)
- Postal code: 10080
- Dialing code: 0124

Busano is a comune (municipality) in the Metropolitan City of Turin in the Italian region Piedmont, located about 30 kilometres (19 mi) north of Turin.

Busano borders the following municipalities: Rivara, San Ponso, Favria, Barbania, Vauda Canavese, Oglianico, Front, and Valperga.
