= San Ponso =

- Comune
- Comune di San Ponso
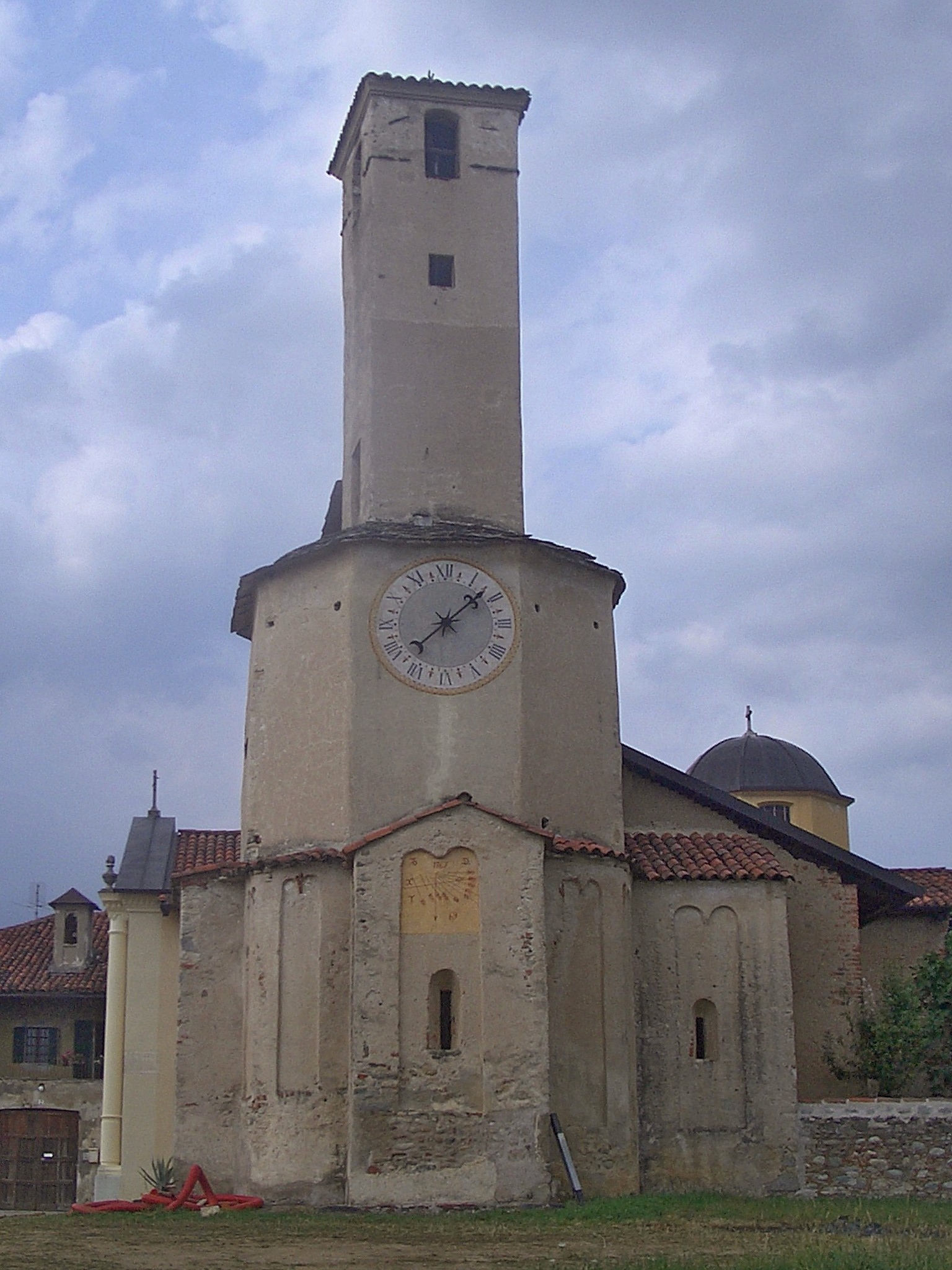
- Baptistery of San Ponso.

- Location within Italy Location within Piedmont
- Coordinates: 45°21′N 7°40′E
- Country: Italy
- Region: Piedmont
- Metropolitan city: Turin (TO)

Government
  - Mayor: Ornella Moretto

Area
  - Total: 2.12 km^{2} (0.82 sq mi)
- Elevation: 347 m (1,138 ft)

Population (1-1-2017)
  - Total: 268
  - Density: 126/km^{2} (327/sq mi)
- Demonym: Samponese(i)
- Time zone: UTC+1 (CET)
  - Summer (DST): UTC+2 (CEST)
- Postal code: 10080
- Dialing code: 0124

San Ponso is a comune (municipality) in the Metropolitan City of Turin in the Italian region Piedmont, located about 30 kilometres (19 mi) north of Turin.

San Ponso borders the following municipalities: Valperga, Salassa, Pertusio, Rivara, Busano, and Oglianico.
