= Pertusio =

- Comune
- Comune di Pertusio
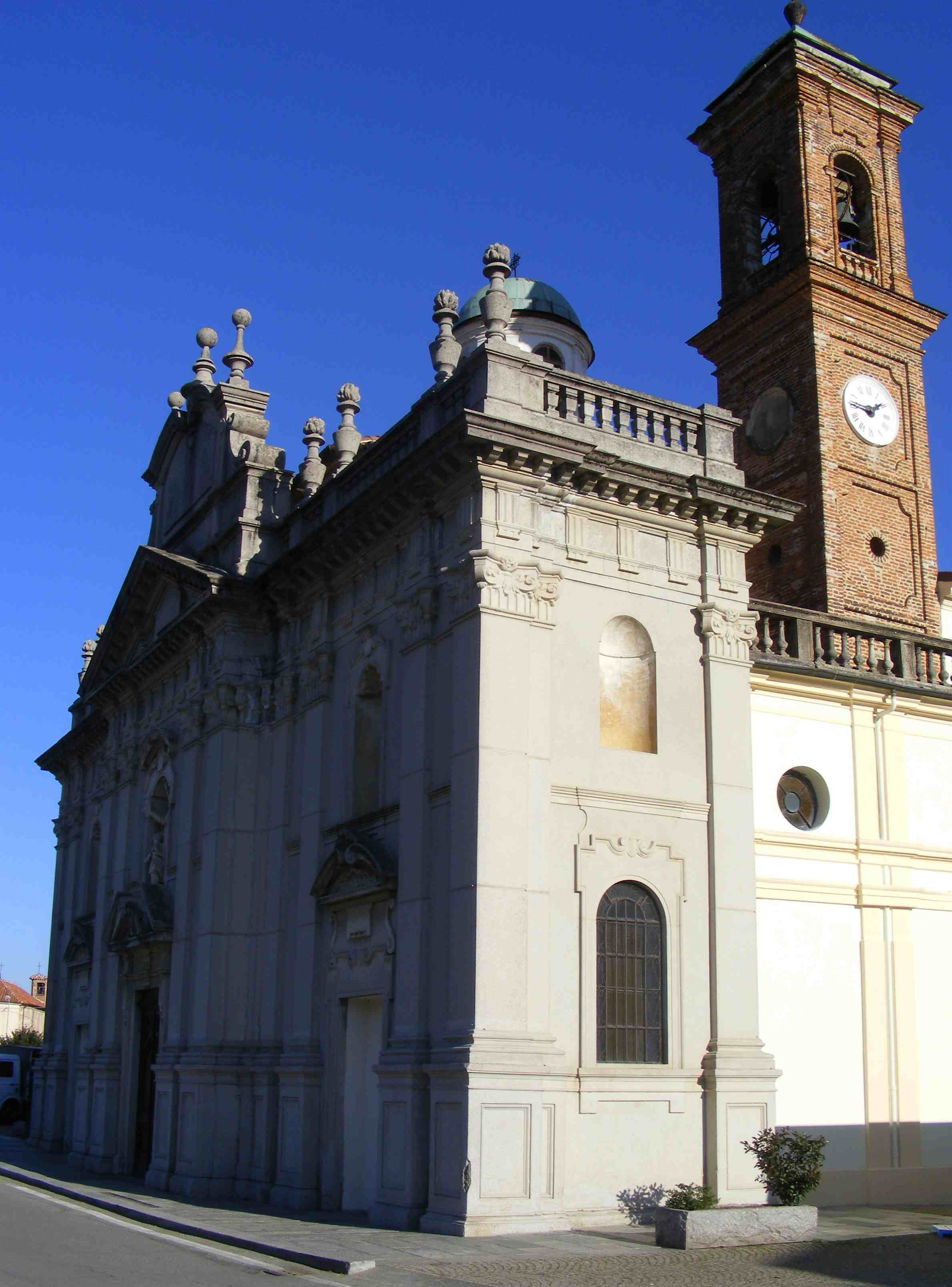

- Location within Italy Location within Piedmont
- Coordinates: 45°21′N 7°38′E
- Country: Italy
- Region: Piedmont
- Metropolitan city: Turin (TO)

Area
  - Total: 4.0 km^{2} (1.5 sq mi)

Population (Dec. 2004)
  - Total: 736
  - Density: 180/km^{2} (480/sq mi)
- Time zone: UTC+1 (CET)
  - Summer (DST): UTC+2 (CEST)
- Postal code: 10080
- Dialing code: 0124

Pertusio is a comune (municipality) in the Metropolitan City of Turin in the Italian region Piedmont, located about 30 km north of Turin. As of 31 December 2004, it had a population of 736 and an area of 4.0 km².

Pertusio borders the following municipalities: Valperga, Prascorsano, Rivara, and San Ponso.

== Demographic evolution ==
Historical population

Year	Pop.	±%
1861	1,045	—
1871	1,170	+12.0%
1881	1,167	−0.3%
1901	1,040	−10.9%
1911	847	−18.6%

Year	Pop.	±%
1921	921	+8.7%
1931	836	−9.2%
1936	821	−1.8%
1951	722	−12.1%
1961	706	−2.2%

Year	Pop.	±%
1971	676	−4.2%
1981	626	−7.4%
1991	652	+4.2%
2001	699	+7.2%

Source: Data from ISTAT
