= Levone =

- Comune
- Comune di Levone
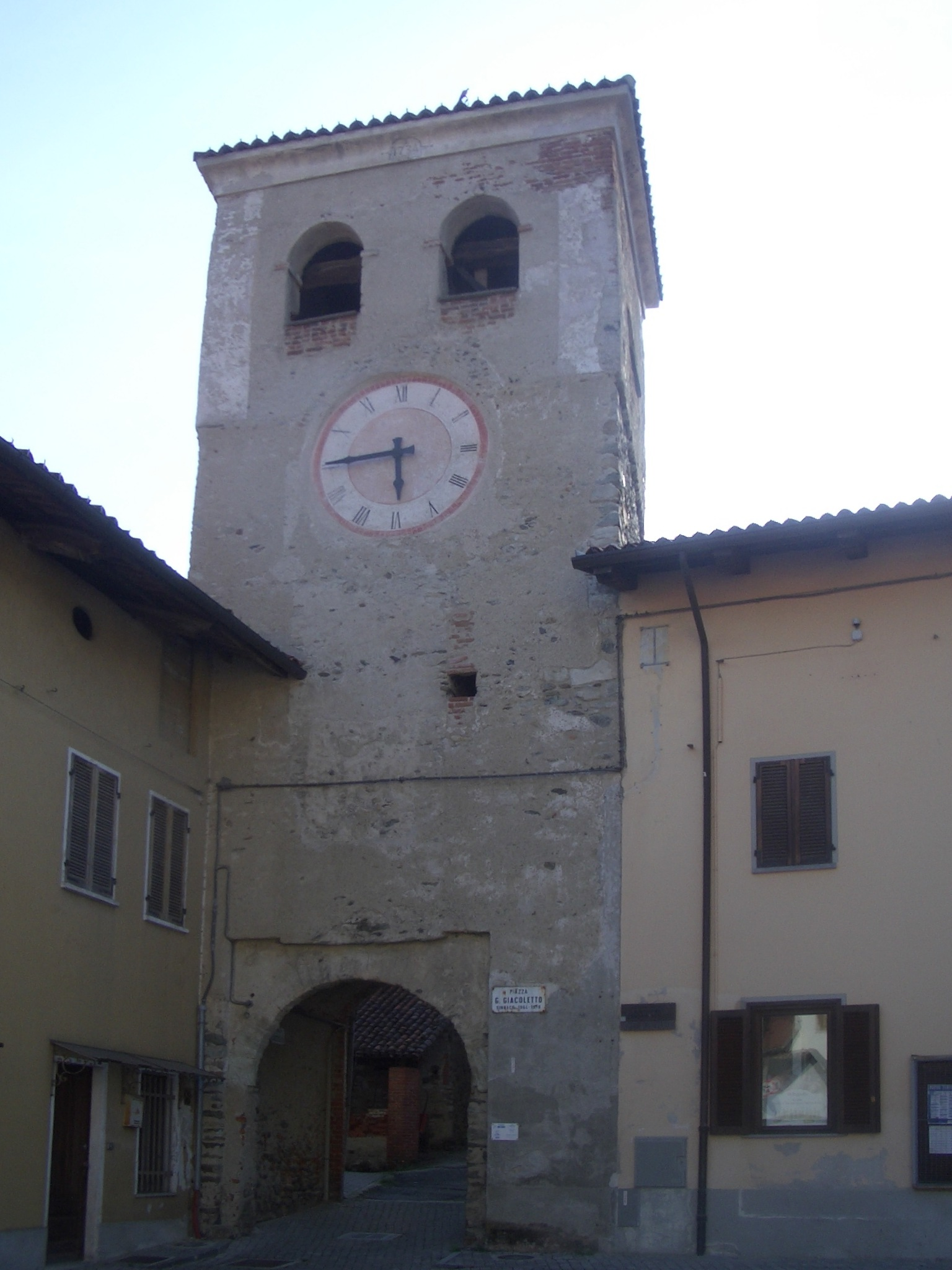
- Gate at the medieval Ricetto

- Coat of arms

- Location within Italy Location within Piedmont
- Coordinates: 45°19′N 7°36′E
- Country: Italy
- Region: Piedmont
- Metropolitan city: Turin (TO)

Government
  - Mayor: Massimiliano Gagnor

Area
  - Total: 5.4 km^{2} (2.1 sq mi)
- Elevation: 343 m (1,125 ft)

Population (31 December 2010)
  - Total: 459
  - Density: 85/km^{2} (220/sq mi)
- Demonym: Levonesi
- Time zone: UTC+1 (CET)
  - Summer (DST): UTC+2 (CEST)
- Postal code: 10070
- Dialing code: 0124
- Patron saint: St.James the Great apostle
- Website: Official website

Levone is a comune (municipality) in the Metropolitan City of Turin in the Italian region Piedmont, located about 30 kilometres (19 mi) northwest of Turin.

The first recorded document mentioning Levone dates back to 1197.

Levone borders the following municipalities: Forno Canavese, Rivara, Rocca Canavese, and Barbania.
