= Vauda Canavese =

- Comune
- Comune di Vauda Canavese
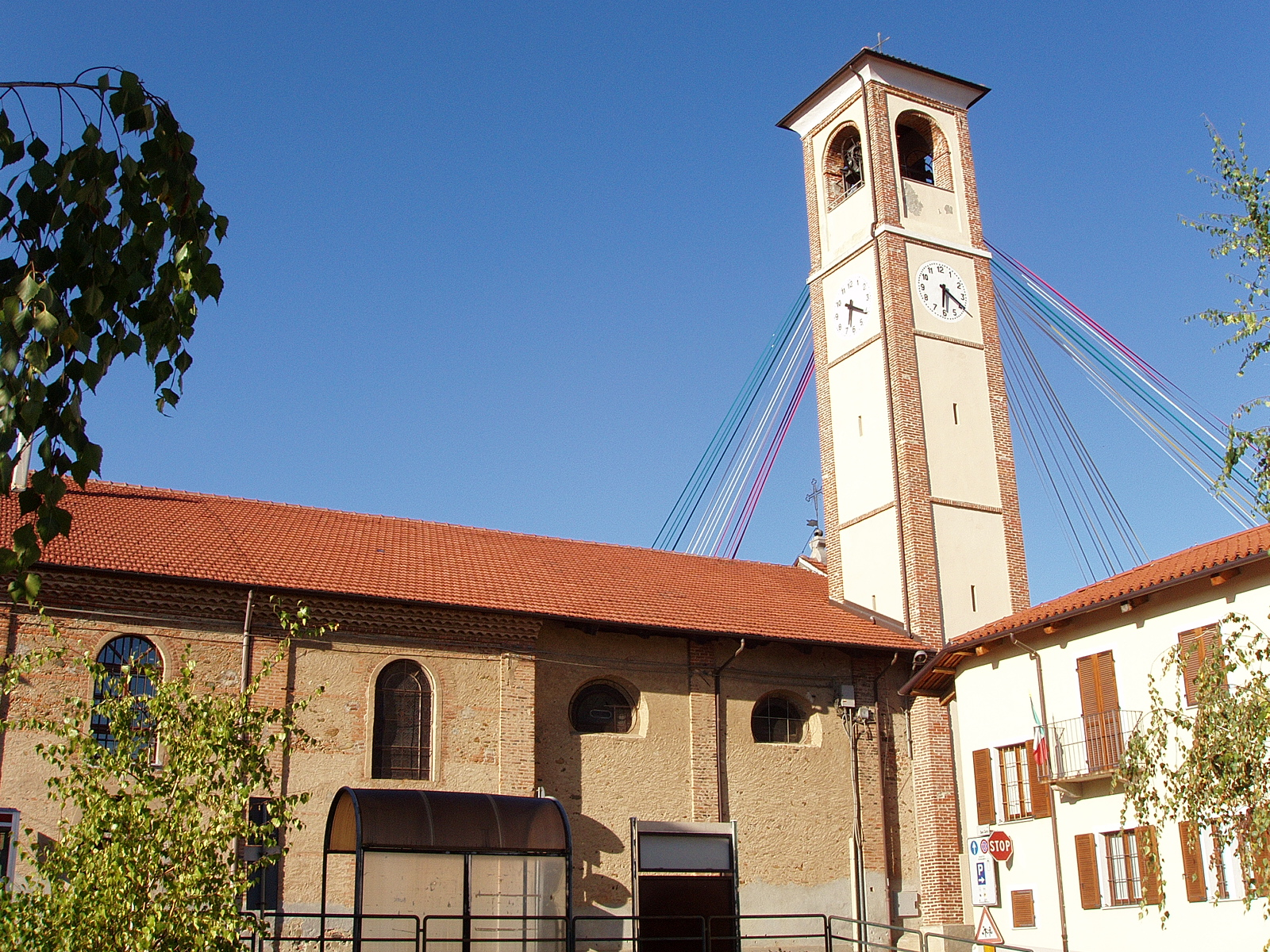

- Coat of arms

- Location within Italy Location within Piedmont
- Coordinates: 45°17′N 7°37′E
- Country: Italy
- Region: Piedmont
- Metropolitan city: Turin (TO)
- Frazioni: Palazzo Grosso, Vauda Inferiore

Government
  - Mayor: Alessandro Fiorio

Area
  - Total: 7.2 km^{2} (2.8 sq mi)
- Elevation: 396 m (1,299 ft)

Population (31 December 2010)
  - Total: 1,496
  - Density: 210/km^{2} (540/sq mi)
- Time zone: UTC+1 (CET)
  - Summer (DST): UTC+2 (CEST)
- Postal code: 10070
- Dialing code: 011

Vauda Canavese is a comune (municipality) in the Metropolitan City of Turin in the Italian region Piedmont, located about 25 kilometres (16 mi) northwest of Turin.

Vauda Canavese borders the following municipalities: Busano, Rocca Canavese, Barbania, San Carlo Canavese, Front, and San Francesco al Campo.
