= Candia Canavese Castle =

- Castello di Candia Canavese
- Candia Canavese, Piedmont, Italy
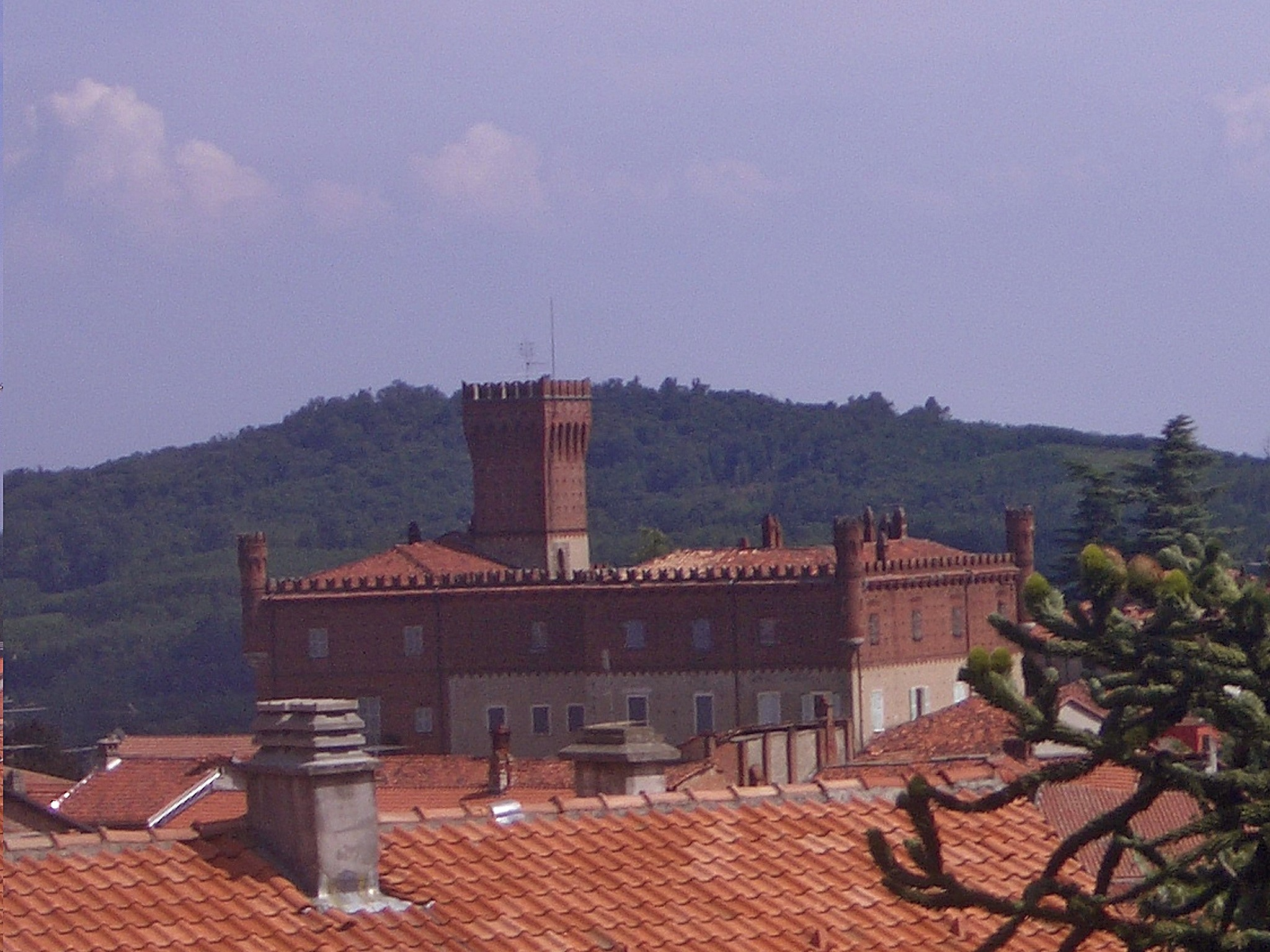
- Candia Canavese Castle in 2009

Site information
- Type: Castle

Location
- Location in Italy
- Coordinates: 45°19′42.84″N 7°53′18.3″E

Candia Canavese Castle (Italian: Castello di Albiano d'Ivrea), also known as Castelfiorito, is a castle located in Candia Canavese, Piedmont, Italy.

== History ==
The castle was strongly damaged during the Canavese War in the 14th century. Later, it was dismantled by Fabrotino da Parma. Parts of this older structure can be seen in the surrounding houses. The current building is the result of a 19th-century reconstruction.
