= Quagliuzzo =

- Comune
- Comune di Quagliuzzo
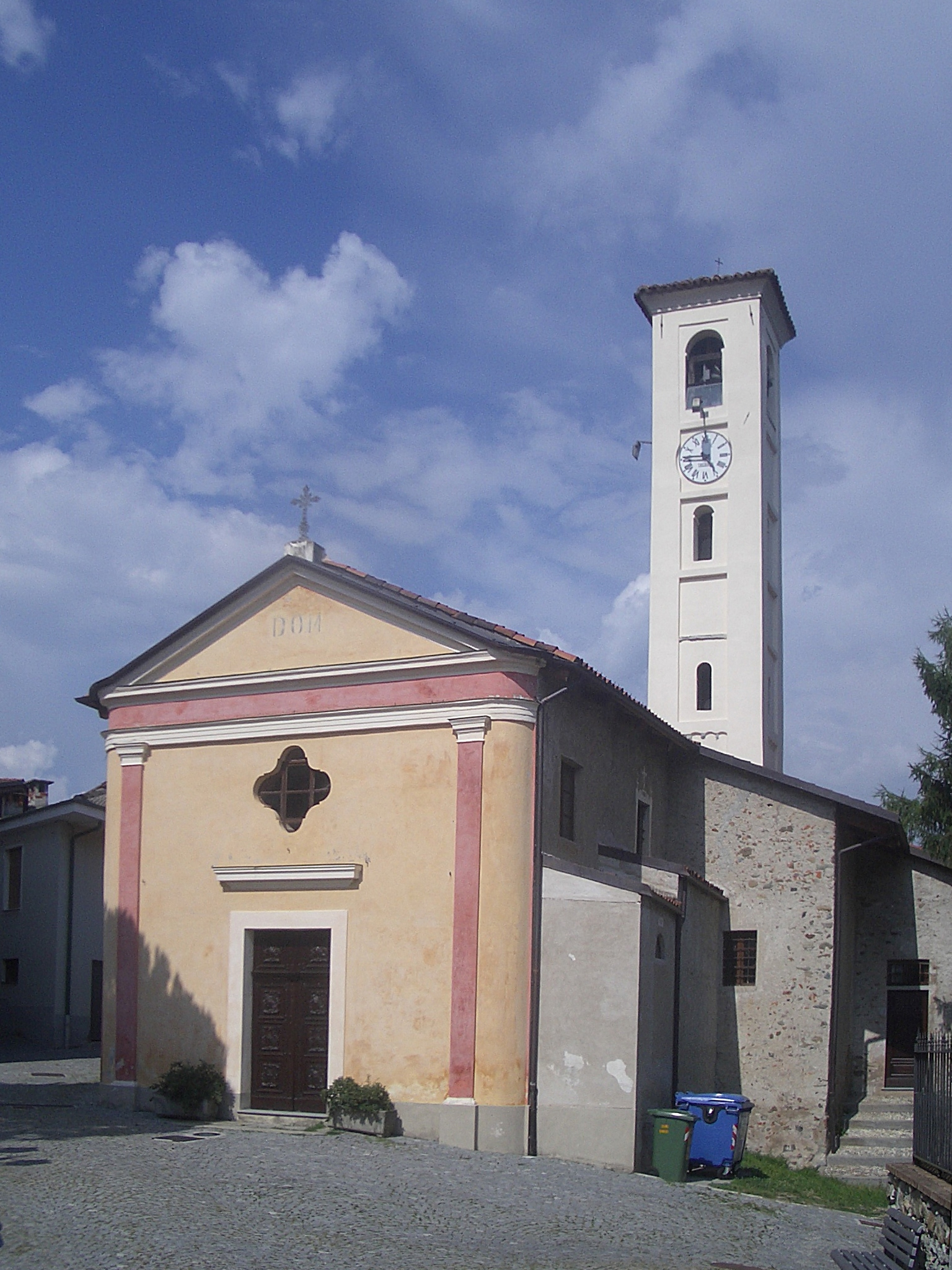
- The old parish church

- Location within Italy Location within Piedmont
- Coordinates: 45°26′N 7°47′E
- Country: Italy
- Region: Piedmont
- Metropolitan city: Turin (TO)

Government
  - Mayor: Ernesto Barlese

Area
  - Total: 2.04 km^{2} (0.79 sq mi)
- Elevation: 334 m (1,096 ft)

Population (31 August 2021)
  - Total: 330
  - Density: 160/km^{2} (420/sq mi)
- Demonym: Quagliuzzesi
- Time zone: UTC+1 (CET)
  - Summer (DST): UTC+2 (CEST)
- Postal code: 10010
- Dialing code: 0125
- Patron saint: Presentation of Jesus at the Temple
- Saint day: 2 February
- Website: Official website

Quagliuzzo is a comune (municipality) in the Metropolitan City of Turin in the northern Italian region Piedmont, located about 40 kilometres (25 mi) north of Turin.
