= Feletto =

- Comune
- Comune di Feletto
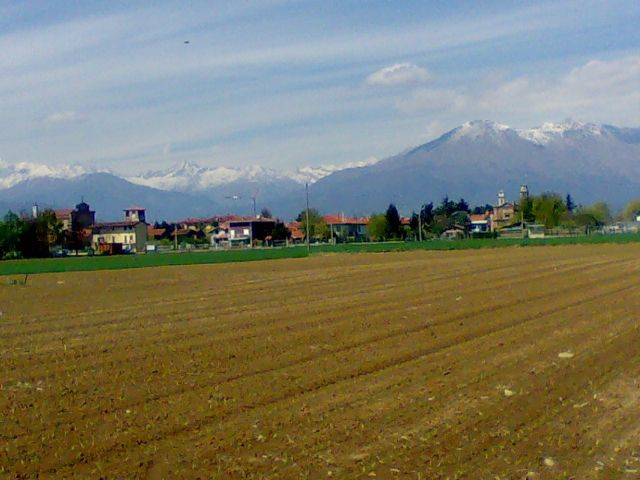

- Location within Italy Location within Piedmont
- Coordinates: 45°18′18″N 7°44′46″E
- Country: Italy
- Region: Piedmont
- Metropolitan city: Turin (TO)

Government
  - Mayor: Alessandro Villa

Area
  - Total: 8.0 km^{2} (3.1 sq mi)
- Elevation: 275 m (902 ft)

Population (31 December 2016)
  - Total: 2,327
  - Density: 290/km^{2} (750/sq mi)
- Demonym: Felettesi
- Time zone: UTC+1 (CET)
  - Summer (DST): UTC+2 (CEST)
- Postal code: 10080
- Dialing code: 0124
- Website: Official website

Feletto is a comune (municipality) in the Metropolitan City of Turin in the Italian region Piedmont, located about 25 kilometres (16 mi) north of Turin.

Feletto borders the following municipalities: San Giorgio Canavese, Rivarolo Canavese, Lusigliè, San Giusto Canavese, and Bosconero.
