= Lusigliè =

- Comune
- Comune di Lusigliè
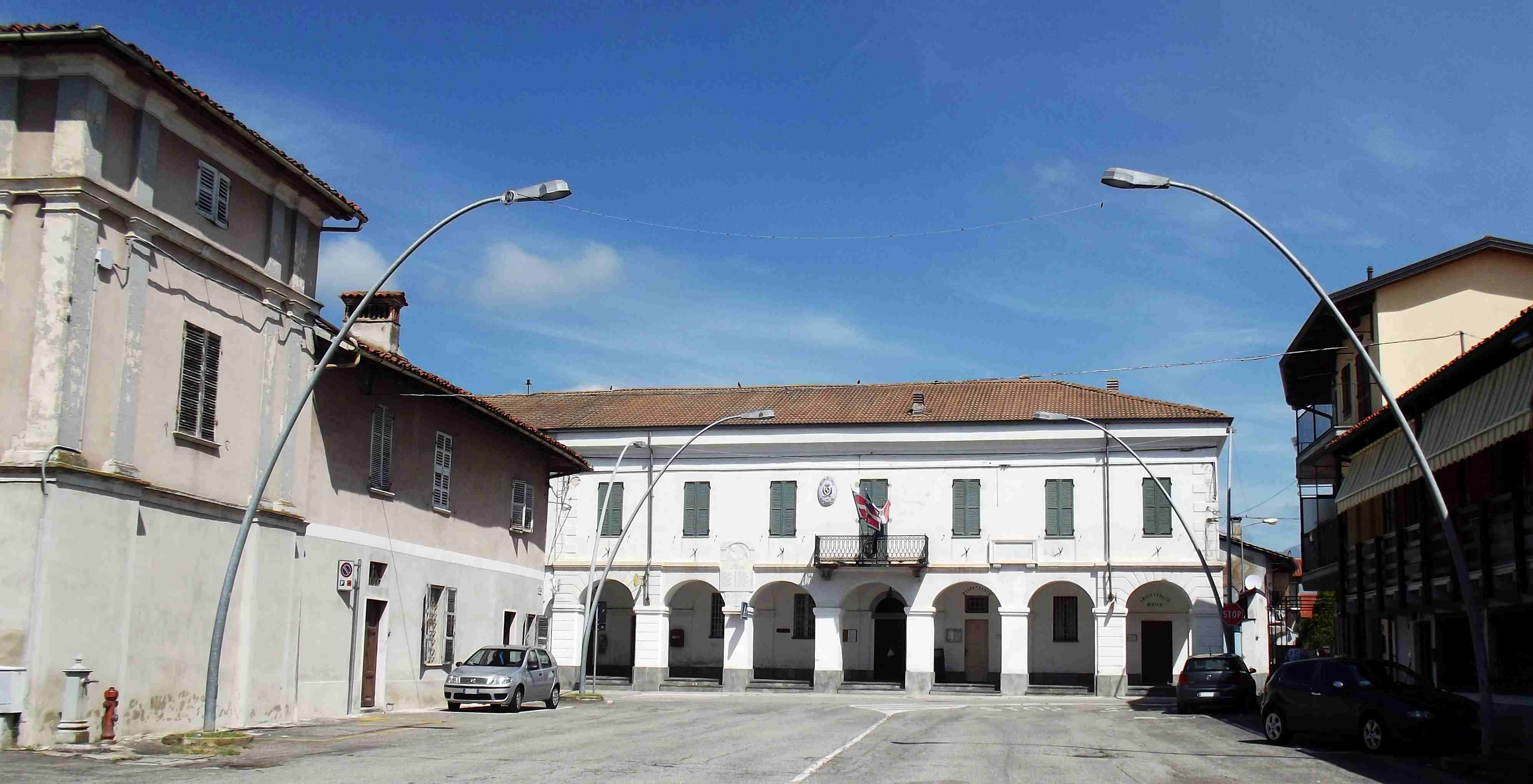
- Don Ailone square

- Location within Italy Location within Piedmont
- Coordinates: 45°19′N 7°45′E
- Country: Italy
- Region: Piedmont
- Metropolitan city: Turin (TO)

Government
  - Mayor: Angelo Marasca

Area
  - Total: 5.26 km^{2} (2.03 sq mi)
- Elevation: 268 m (879 ft)

Population (30 September 2017)
  - Total: 560
  - Density: 110/km^{2} (280/sq mi)
- Demonym: Lusigliesi
- Time zone: UTC+1 (CET)
  - Summer (DST): UTC+2 (CEST)
- Postal code: 10080
- Dialing code: 0124
- Patron saint: Madonna of the Rosary
- Saint day: 7 October
- Website: Official website

Lusigliè is a comune (municipality) in the Metropolitan City of Turin in the Italian region Piedmont, located about 30 kilometres (19 mi) north of Turin.

Lusigliè borders the following municipalities: San Giorgio Canavese, Rivarolo Canavese, Ciconio, and Feletto.
