= Ciconio =

- Comune
- Comune di Ciconio
- Location within Italy Location within Piedmont
- Coordinates: 45°20′N 7°46′E
- Country: Italy
- Region: Piedmont
- Metropolitan city: Turin (TO)

Government
  - Mayor: Fabrizio Ferrarese

Area
  - Total: 3.2 km^{2} (1.2 sq mi)
- Elevation: 273 m (896 ft)

Population (31 December 2010)
  - Total: 365
  - Density: 110/km^{2} (300/sq mi)
- Demonym: Ciconiesi
- Time zone: UTC+1 (CET)
  - Summer (DST): UTC+2 (CEST)
- Postal code: 10080
- Dialing code: 0124
- Patron saint: Sts. Peter and Paul
- Saint day: 29 June
- Website: Official website

Ciconio is a comune (municipality) in the Metropolitan City of Turin in the Italian region Piedmont, about 30 kilometres (19 mi) north of Turin.

Ciconio borders the following municipalities: San Giorgio Canavese, Ozegna, Rivarolo Canavese, and Lusigliè.
