= Barbania =

- Comune
- Comune di Barbania
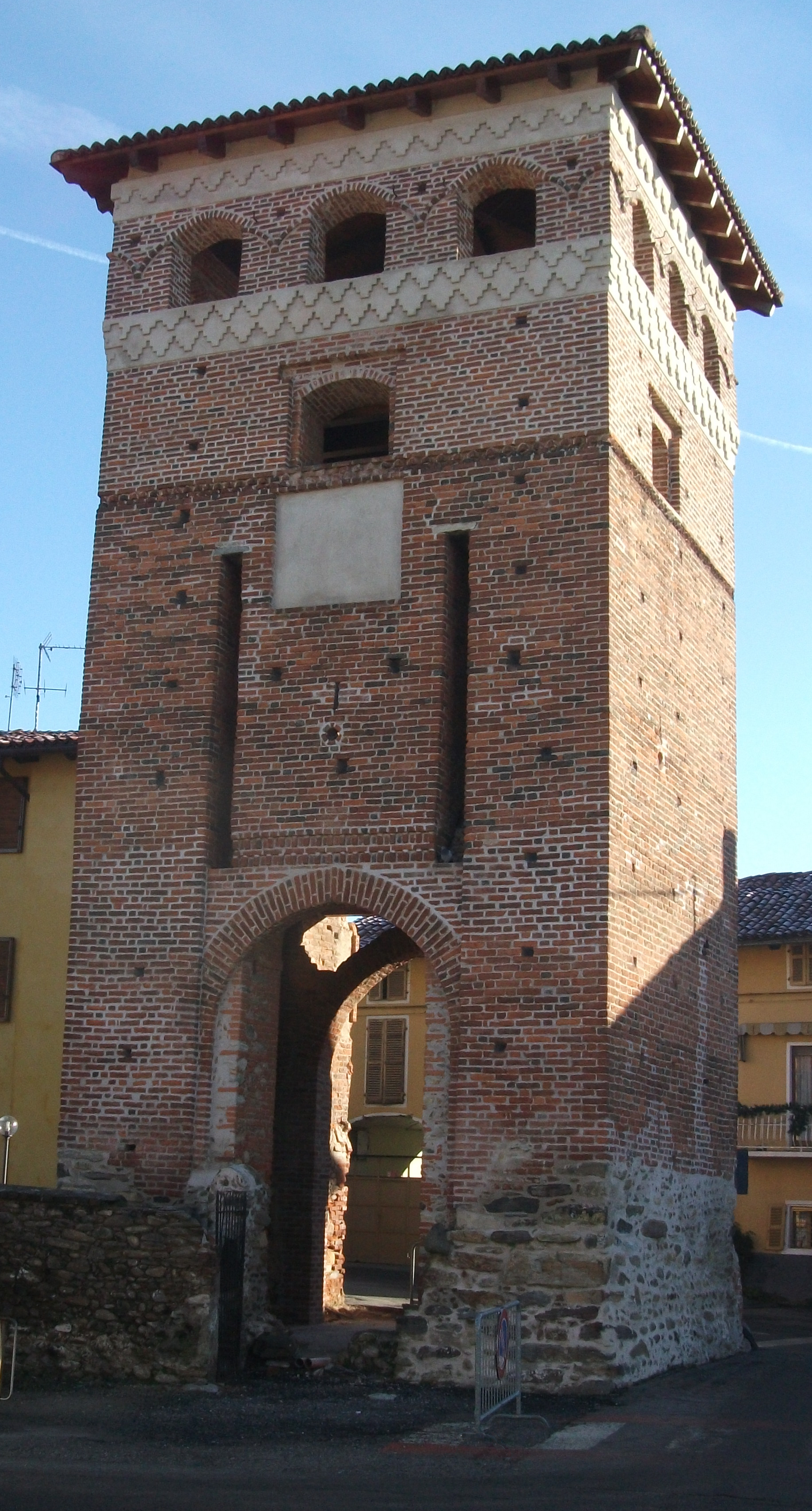
- The surviving entrance to the medieval ricetto or fortress

- Coat of arms

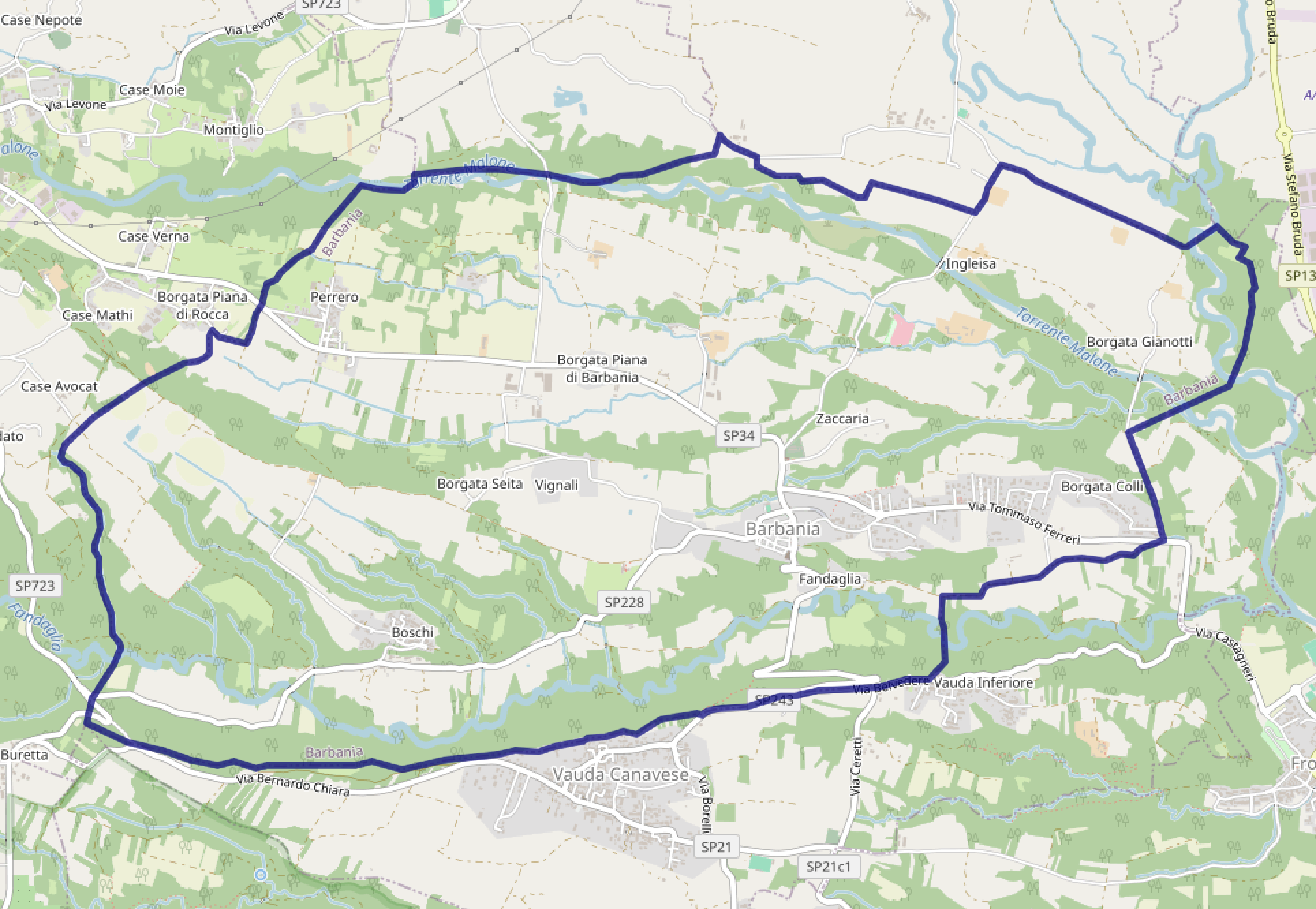
- OSM map of Barbania.

- Location within Italy Location within Piedmont
- Coordinates: 45°18′N 7°38′E
- Country: Italy
- Region: Piedmont
- Metropolitan city: Turin (TO)
- Frazioni: Boschi, Colli, Fandaglia, Gianotti, Perrero, Piana, Seita, Vignali, Zaccaria

Government
  - Mayor: Giuseppe Drovetti

Area
  - Total: 12.80 km^{2} (4.94 sq mi)
- Elevation: 385 m (1,263 ft)

Population (1-1-2017)
  - Total: 1,603
  - Density: 125.2/km^{2} (324.4/sq mi)
- Demonym: Barbaniesi
- Time zone: UTC+1 (CET)
  - Summer (DST): UTC+2 (CEST)
- Postal code: 10070
- Dialing code: 011
- Website: Official website

Barbania is a comune (municipality) in the Metropolitan City of Turin in the Italian region Piedmont, located about 25 kilometres (16 mi) north of Turin. It is in the middle of the Malone river plain.

Barbania borders the following municipalities: Rivara, Busano, Rocca Canavese, Levone, and Vauda Canavese. It originates from a Salassi Celtic village founded around the late 5th century BC. In the Middle Ages it was a free commune (11th century), until it was conquered by Philip I of Piedmont in 1305; thenceforth, its history is connected with the Duchy of Savoy.
