= Oglianico =

- Comune
- Comune di Oglianico
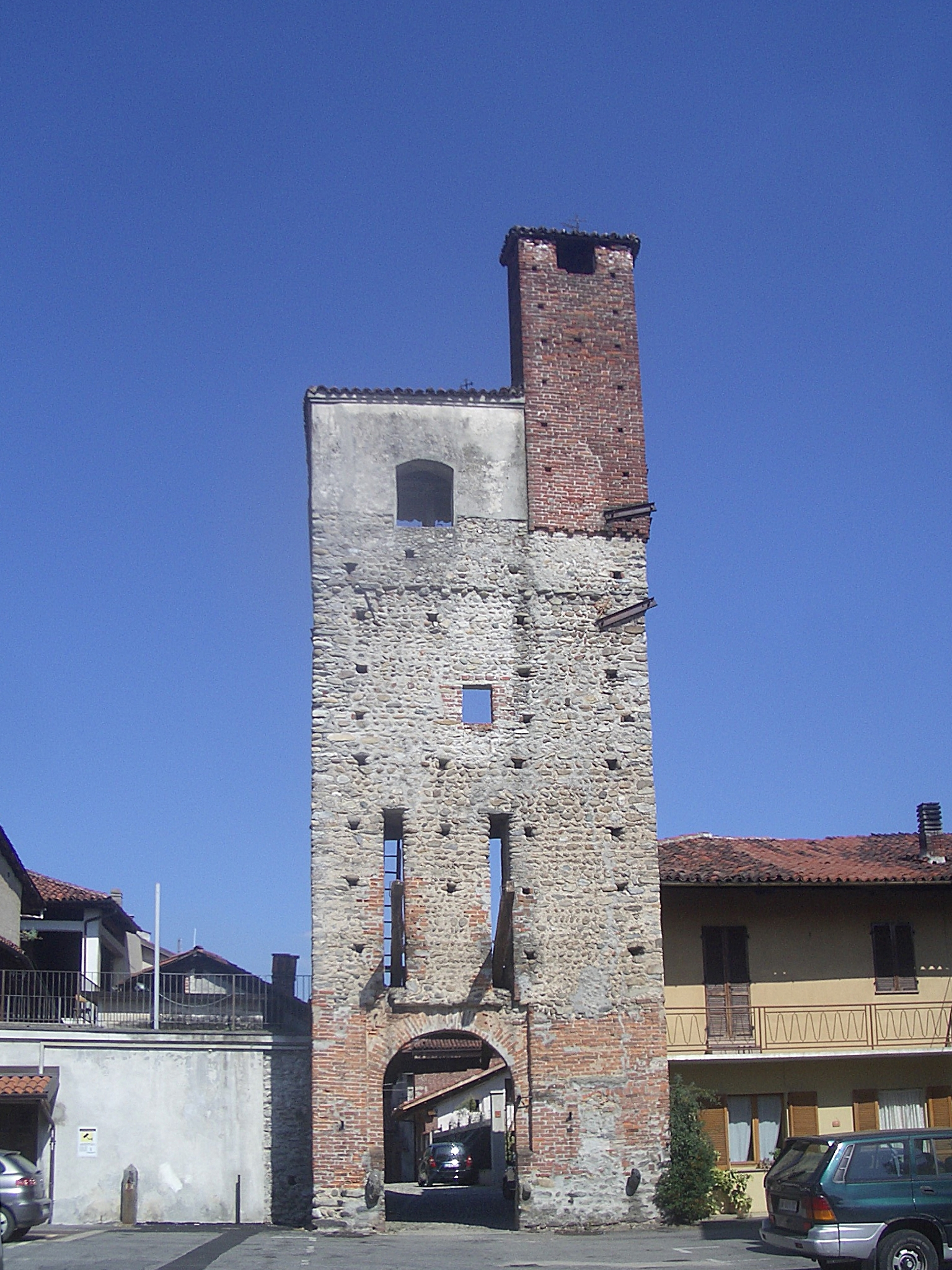
- The medieval gate-tower.

- Location within Italy Location within Piedmont
- Coordinates: 45°20′N 7°42′E
- Country: Italy
- Region: Piedmont
- Metropolitan city: Turin (TO)
- Frazioni: Borgata San Grato, San Francesco Benne

Government
  - Mayor: Onorino Nardino Freddi

Area
  - Total: 6.2 km^{2} (2.4 sq mi)
- Elevation: 326 m (1,070 ft)

Population (31 December 2015)
  - Total: 1,506
  - Density: 240/km^{2} (630/sq mi)
- Demonym: Oglianicesi
- Time zone: UTC+1 (CET)
  - Summer (DST): UTC+2 (CEST)
- Postal code: 10080
- Dialing code: 0124
- Website: Official website

Oglianico is a comune (municipality) in the Metropolitan City of Turin in the Italian region Piedmont, located about 30 kilometres (19 mi) north of Turin. Oglianico borders the following municipalities: Salassa, Rivarolo Canavese, San Ponso, Busano, Favria, Rivarossa, and Front.
