= Rivarossa =

- Comune
- Comune di Rivarossa

- Location within Italy Location within Piedmont
- Coordinates: 45°15′N 7°43′E
- Country: Italy
- Region: Piedmont
- Metropolitan city: Turin (TO)

Government
  - Mayor: Enrico Vallino

Area
  - Total: 10.87 km^{2} (4.20 sq mi)
- Elevation: 286 m (938 ft)

Population (31 December 2010)
  - Total: 1,658
  - Density: 152.5/km^{2} (395.1/sq mi)
- Demonym: Rivarossesi
- Time zone: UTC+1 (CET)
  - Summer (DST): UTC+2 (CEST)
- Postal code: 10040
- Dialing code: 011
- Website: Official website

Rivarossa is a comune (municipality) in the Metropolitan City of Turin in the Italian region Piedmont, located about 20 km north of Turin. Rivarossa borders the following municipalities: Rivarolo Canavese, Oglianico, Front, San Francesco al Campo, and Lombardore.
