= Montalenghe =

- Comune
- Comune di Montalenghe
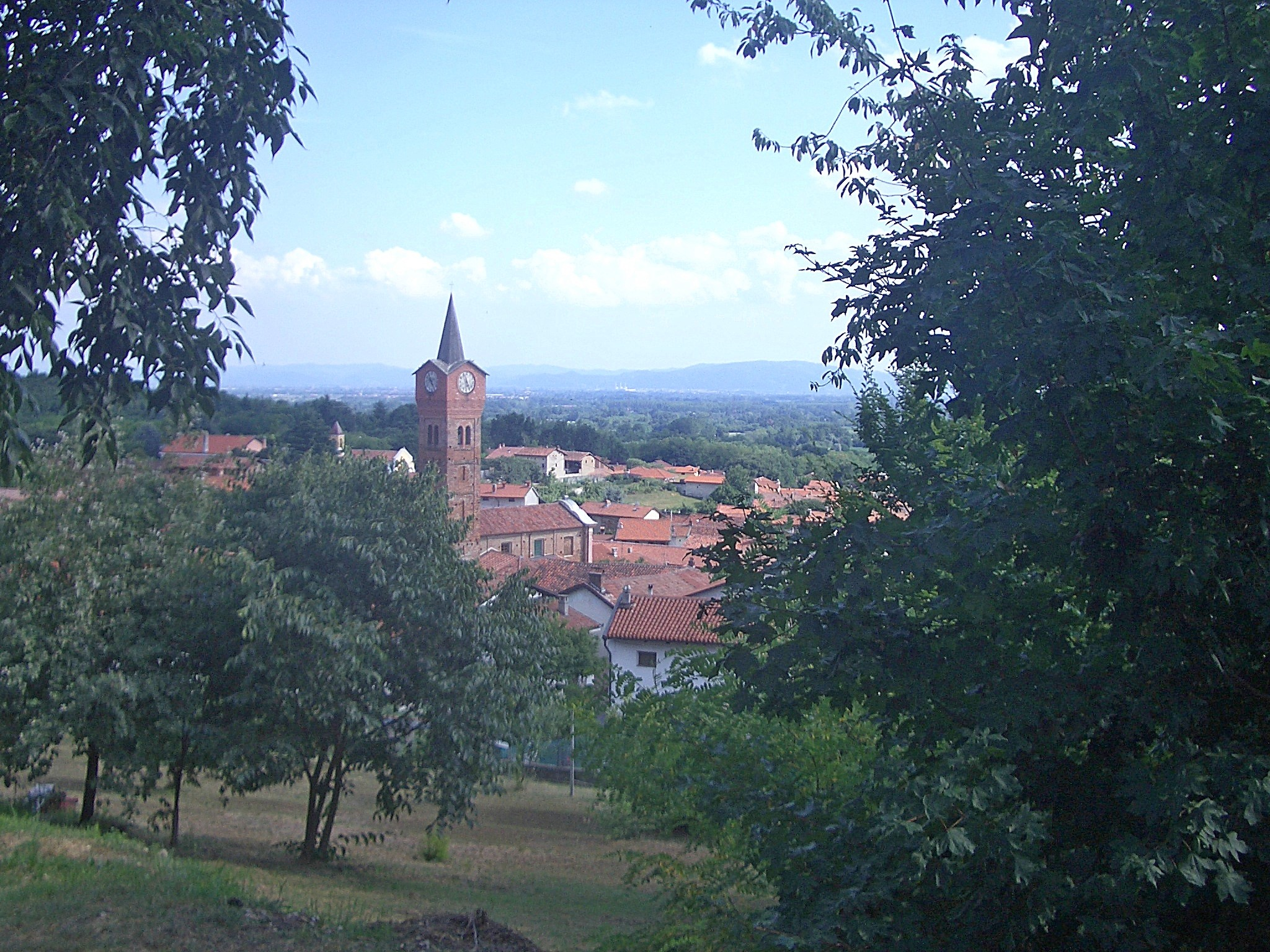

- Coat of arms

- Location within Italy Location within Piedmont
- Coordinates: 45°20′N 7°50′E
- Country: Italy
- Region: Piedmont
- Metropolitan city: Turin (TO)

Government
  - Mayor: Valerio Camillo Grosso

Area
  - Total: 6.5 km^{2} (2.5 sq mi)
- Elevation: 360 m (1,180 ft)

Population (31 May 2007)
  - Total: 912
  - Density: 140/km^{2} (360/sq mi)
- Demonym: Montalenghesi
- Time zone: UTC+1 (CET)
  - Summer (DST): UTC+2 (CEST)
- Postal code: 10090
- Dialing code: 011
- Patron saint: Sts. Peter and Paul
- Saint day: 29 June

Montalenghe is a comune (municipality) in the Metropolitan City of Turin in the Italian region Piedmont, located about 30 km northeast of Turin.

== Main sights ==
- Church of San Pietro, built in the 13th century but restored in the late 19th century.
- Parish church of Beata Vergine delle Grazie (1760)
- Castelvecchio (also known as Castellazzo), ruins of the old castle commanding the town (11th-12th centuries)
- The so-called "Castle", in fact an 18th-century villa with a large park in the centre of the town. It houses a Lebanon cedar amongst the oldest in Italy.
