= Ribordone =

Ribordone Ribordon (Piedmontese) Riburdon (Arpitan)
- Comune
- Comune di Ribordone
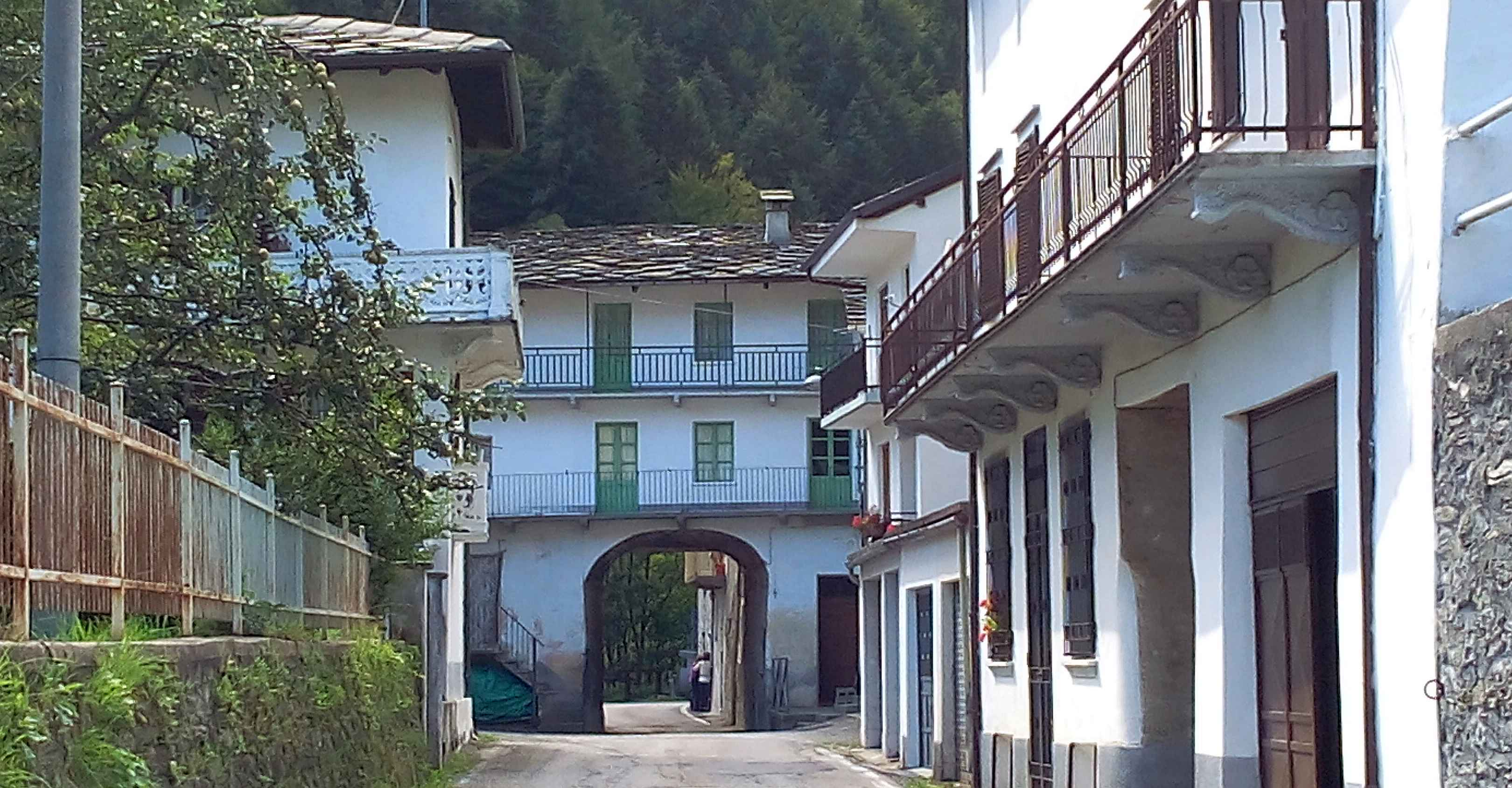
- Houses in Ribordone

- Location within Italy Location within Piedmont
- Coordinates: 45°26′N 7°30′E
- Country: Italy
- Region: Piedmont
- Metropolitan city: Turin (TO)
- Frazioni: Ceresa, Costa, Crosa-Crosa Gian, Foggi-Rafur, Posio-Ciantel, Rongorbogno, Schieroglio, Talosio-Riva Rostet, Verlucca

Area
  - Total: 43.60 km^{2} (16.83 sq mi)

Population (2026)
  - Total: 43
  - Density: 0.99/km^{2} (2.6/sq mi)
- Time zone: UTC+1 (CET)
  - Summer (DST): UTC+2 (CEST)
- Postal code: 10080
- Dialing code: 0124

Ribordone (Piedmontese: Ribordon, Arpitan: Riburdon) is a village and comune (municipality) in the Metropolitan City of Turin in the region of Piedmont in Italy, about 45 km (28 mi) northwest of Turin. It has 43 inhabitants.

Ribordone borders the municipalities of Ronco Canavese, Locana, and Sparone.

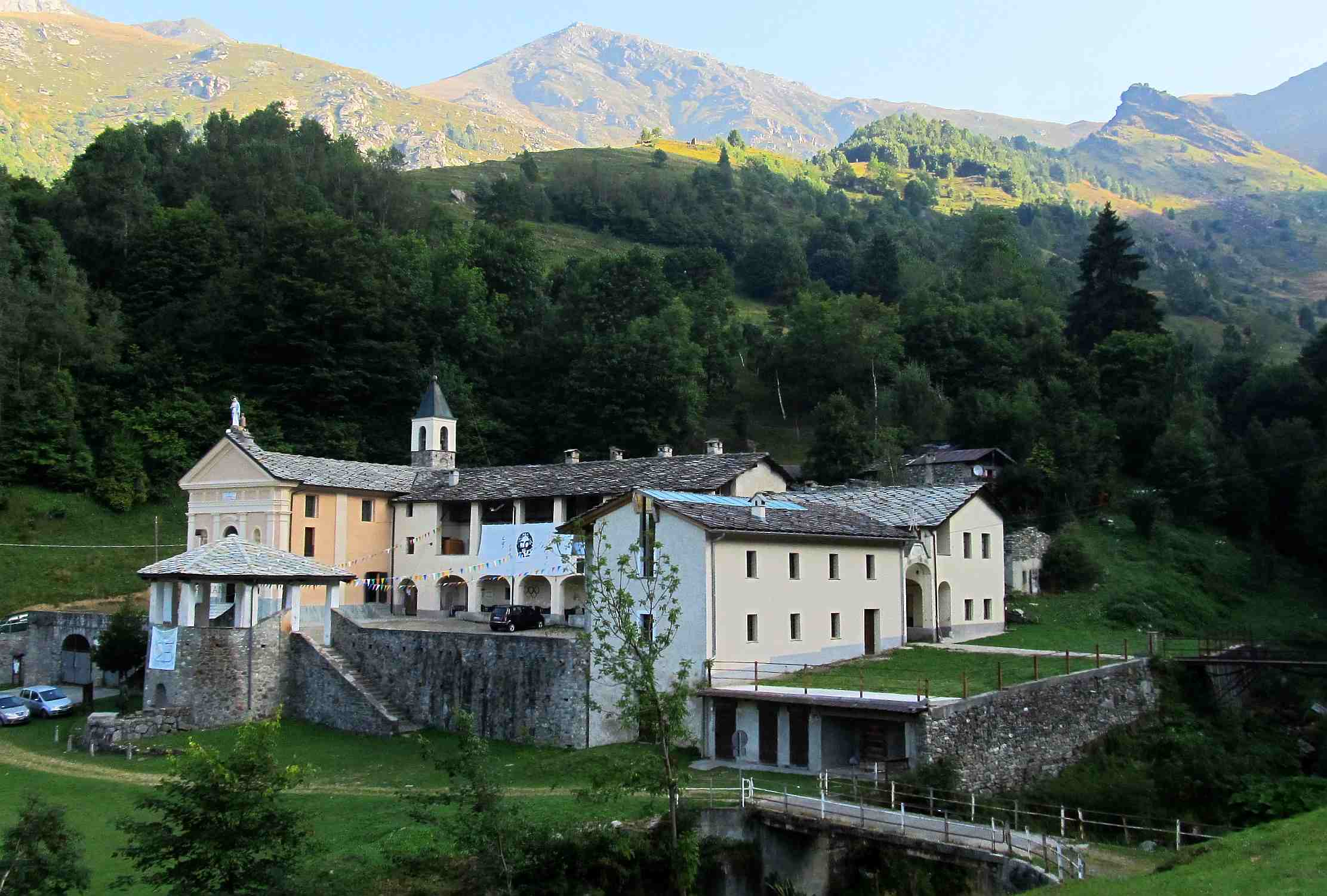
Sanctuary of Prascondù

== Demographics ==
As of 2026, the population is 43, of which 62.8% are male, and 37.2% are female. Minors make up 2.3% of the population, and seniors make up 53.5%.

Historical population

Year	Pop.	±%
1861	1,442	—
1871	1,292	−10.4%
1881	1,274	−1.4%
1901	1,224	−3.9%
1911	1,406	+14.9%
1921	1,080	−23.2%
1931	992	−8.1%
1936	840	−15.3%

Year	Pop.	±%
1951	567	−32.5%
1961	387	−31.7%
1971	215	−44.4%
1981	169	−21.4%
1991	118	−30.2%
2001	84	−28.8%
2011	67	−20.2%
2021	49	−26.9%

Source: ISTAT

=== Immigration ===
As of 2025, of the known countries of birth of 47 residents, the most numerous are: Italy (45 – 95.7%), France (1 – 2.1%) and Dominican Republic (1 – 2.1%).
