= Favria =

- Comune
- Comune di Favria
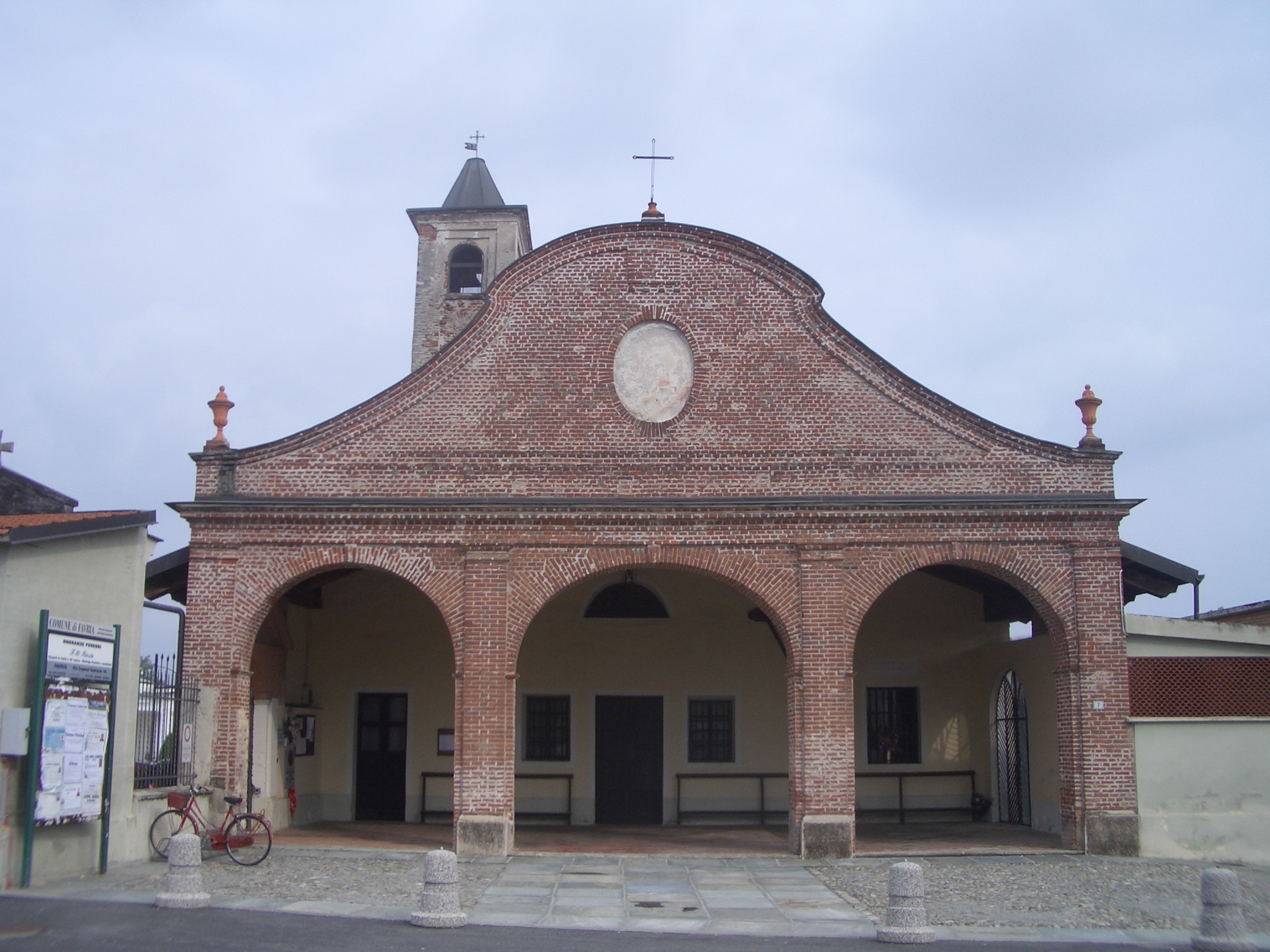
- Cemetery church of San Pietro Vecchio.

- Coat of arms

- Location within Italy Location within Piedmont
- Coordinates: 45°20′N 7°41′E
- Country: Italy
- Region: Piedmont
- Metropolitan city: Turin (TO)

Government
  - Mayor: Serafino Ferrino

Area
  - Total: 14.85 km^{2} (5.73 sq mi)

Population (31 December 2014)
  - Total: 5,202
  - Density: 350.3/km^{2} (907.3/sq mi)
- Demonym: Favriesi
- Time zone: UTC+1 (CET)
  - Summer (DST): UTC+2 (CEST)
- Postal code: 10083
- Dialing code: 0124
- Patron saint: Sts. Peter and Paul
- Website: Official website

Favria is a comune (municipality) in the Metropolitan City of Turin in the Italian region Piedmont, located about 30 kilometres (19 mi) north of Turin.

Favria borders the following municipalities: Rivarolo Canavese, Busano, Oglianico, and Front.

It is home to the church of San Pietro Vecchio, which houses 15th centuries frescoes from the Master of the Marca di Ancona. Of the original 11th-12th centuries edifice, today the base of the bell tower and the Romanesque-style apse remain. The current appearance dates to the 18th-century restoration.
