= Colleretto Castelnuovo =

- Comune
- Comune di Colleretto Castelnuovo
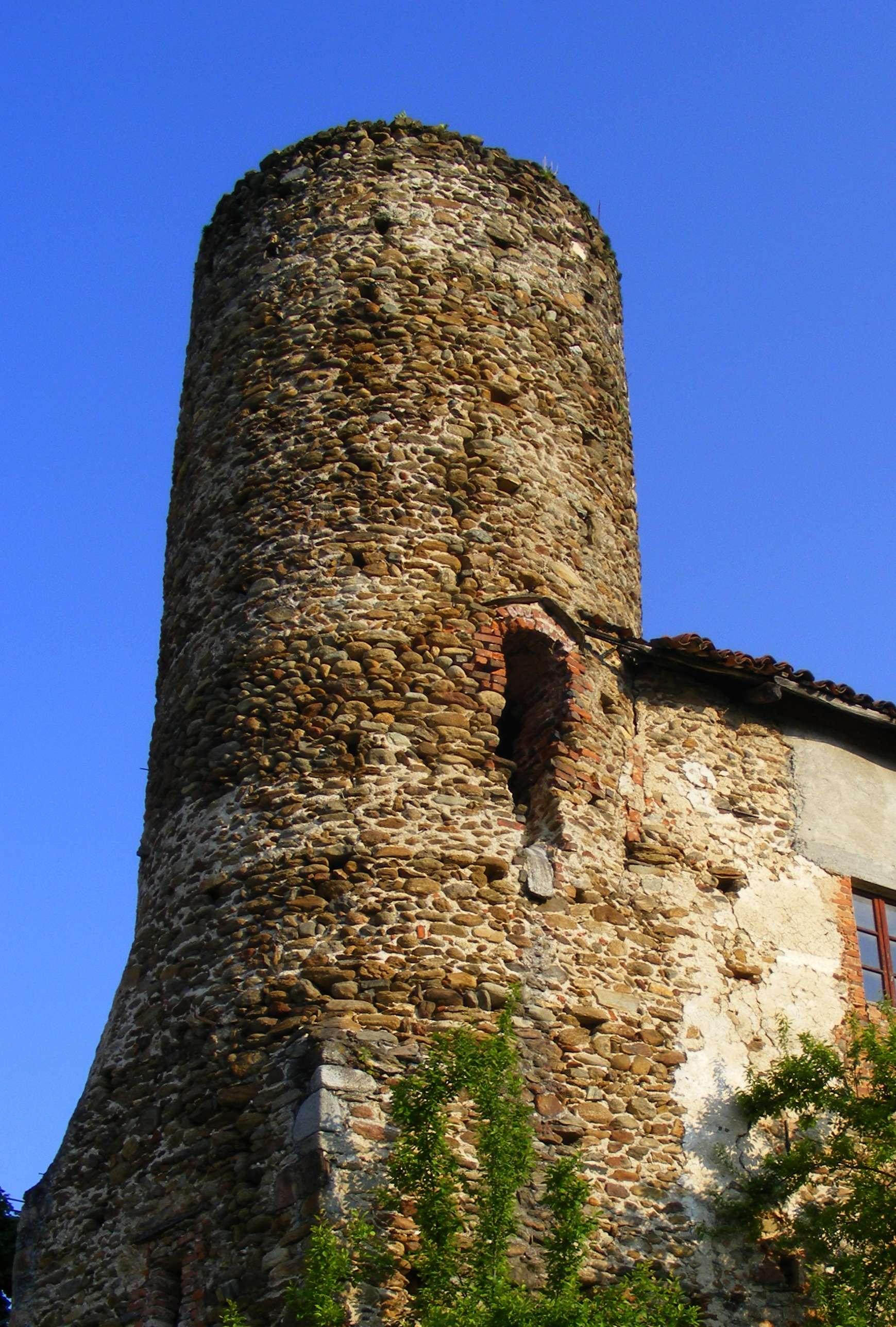
- Medieval tower.

- Coat of arms

- Location within Italy Location within Piedmont
- Coordinates: 45°25′N 7°41′E
- Country: Italy
- Region: Piedmont
- Metropolitan city: Turin (TO)

Government
  - Mayor: Marina Carlevato

Area
  - Total: 6.3 km^{2} (2.4 sq mi)
- Elevation: 585 m (1,919 ft)

Population (31 December 2010)
  - Total: 358
  - Density: 57/km^{2} (150/sq mi)
- Demonym: Collerettesi
- Time zone: UTC+1 (CET)
  - Summer (DST): UTC+2 (CEST)
- Postal code: 10080
- Dialing code: 0124

Colleretto Castelnuovo is a comune (municipality) in the Metropolitan City of Turin in the Italian region of Piedmont, located about 40 kilometres (25 mi) north of Turin.

Colleretto Castelnuovo borders the following municipalities: Castellamonte, Cintano, Borgiallo, and Castelnuovo Nigra.
