= Torrazza Piemonte =

- Comune
- Comune di Torrazza Piemonte
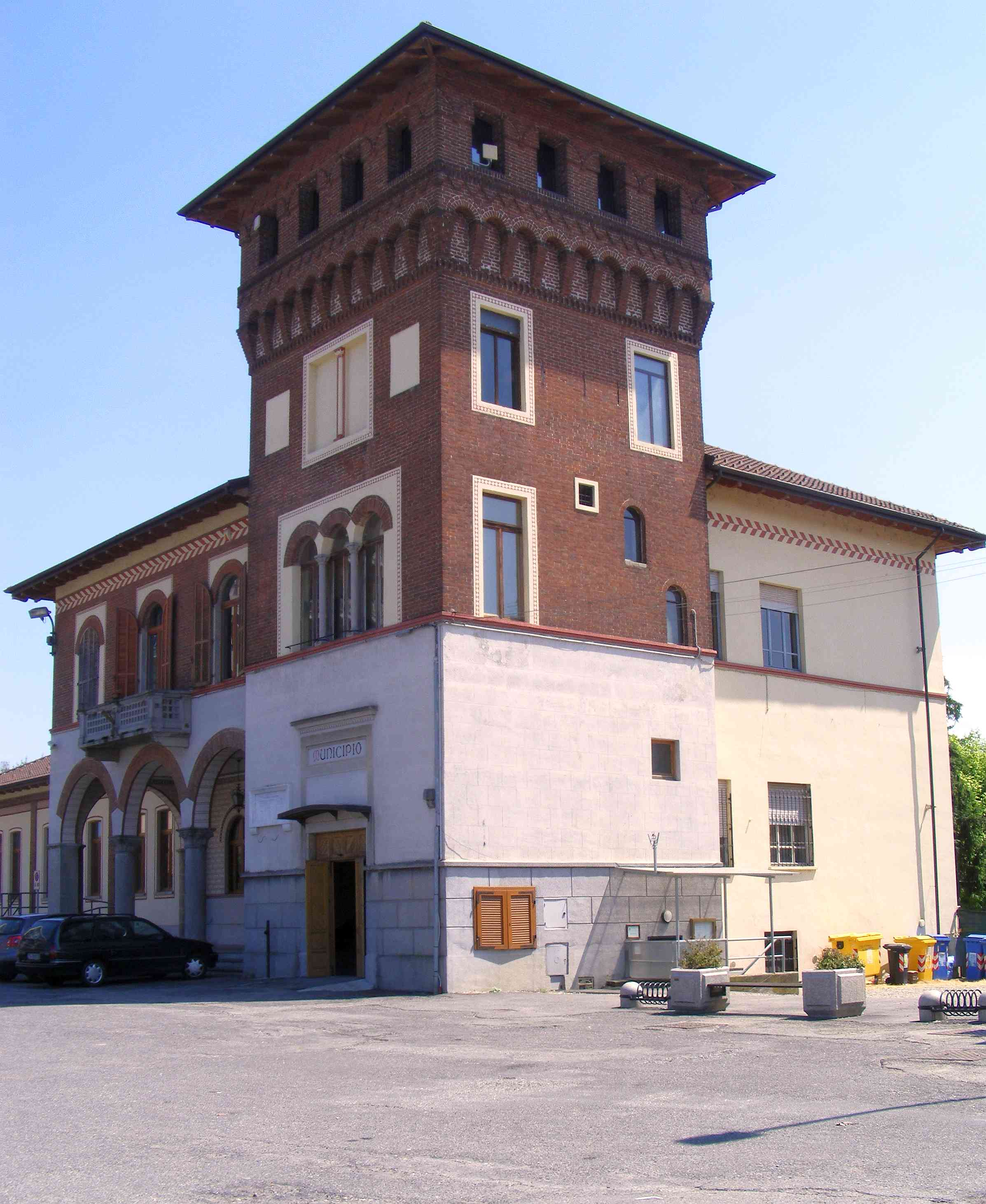

- Location within Italy Location within Piedmont
- Coordinates: 45°13′N 7°58′E
- Country: Italy
- Region: Piedmont
- Metropolitan city: Turin (TO)

Government
  - Mayor: Massimo Rozzino

Area
  - Total: 9.9 km^{2} (3.8 sq mi)
- Elevation: 197 m (646 ft)

Population (Dec. 2004)
  - Total: 2,475
  - Density: 250/km^{2} (650/sq mi)
- Demonym: Torrazzesi
- Time zone: UTC+1 (CET)
  - Summer (DST): UTC+2 (CEST)
- Postal code: 10037
- Dialing code: 011

Torrazza Piemonte is a comune (municipality) in the Metropolitan City of Turin in the Italian region Piedmont, about 25 kilometres (16 mi) northeast of Turin.
