= San Francesco al Campo =

- Comune
- Comune di San Francesco al Campo
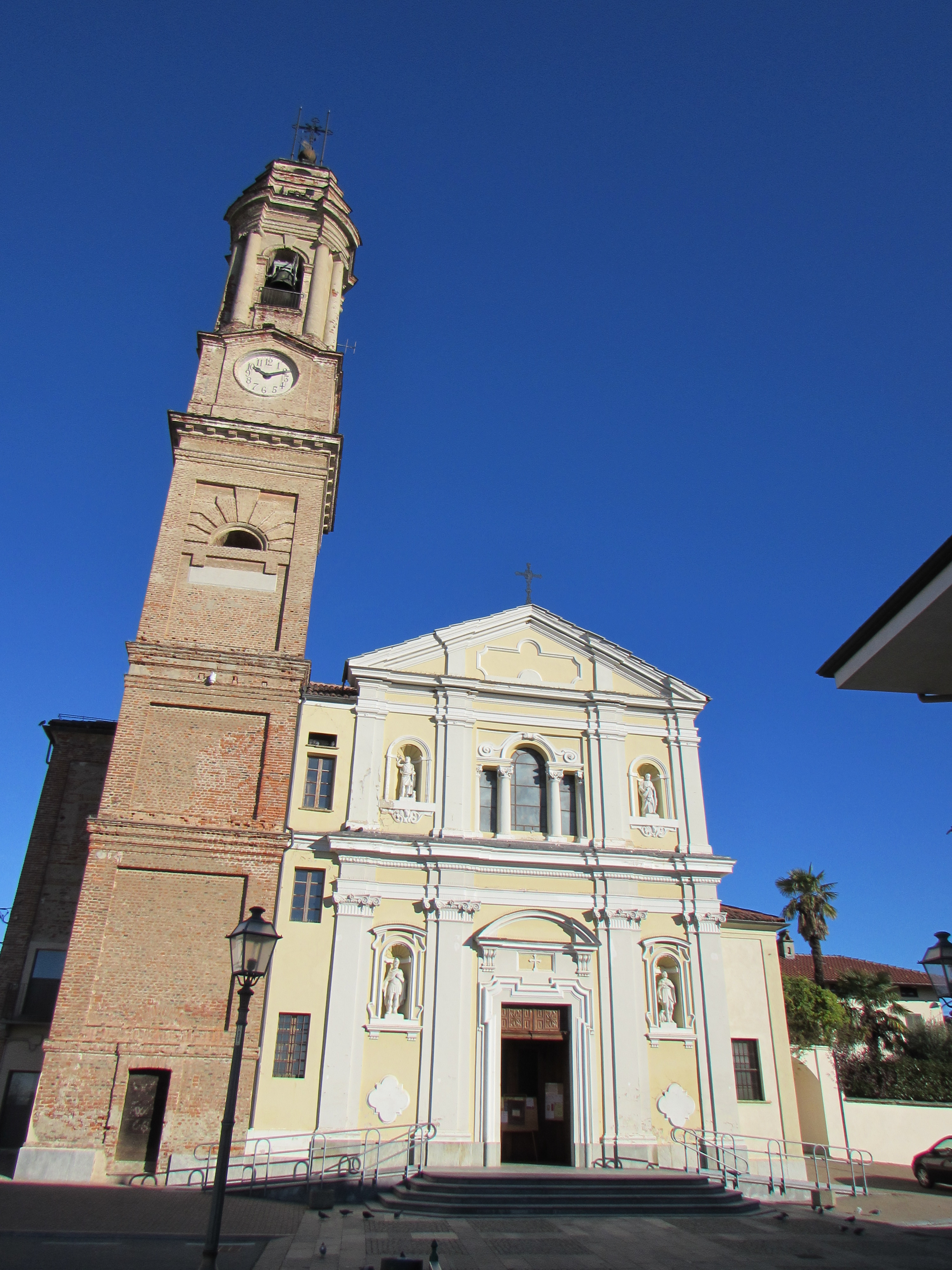

- Coat of arms

- Location within Italy Location within Piedmont
- Coordinates: 45°17′N 7°37′E
- Country: Italy
- Region: Piedmont
- Metropolitan city: Turin (TO)
- Frazioni: Coriasco, Grangia, Banni, Centro, Madonna, Sant'Anna, Bonina e Gamberi

Government
  - Mayor: Diego Coriasco

Area
  - Total: 14.98 km^{2} (5.78 sq mi)
- Elevation: 327 m (1,073 ft)

Population (31 December 2010)
  - Total: 4,877
  - Density: 325.6/km^{2} (843.2/sq mi)
- Demonym: Sanfranceschesi
- Time zone: UTC+1 (CET)
  - Summer (DST): UTC+2 (CEST)
- Postal code: 10070
- Dialing code: 011
- Patron saint: St. Francis of Assisi
- Saint day: First Sunday of October
- Website: Official website

San Francesco al Campo is a comune (municipality) in the Metropolitan City of Turin in the Italian region Piedmont, located about 21 km (13 mi) northwest of Turin.
