= Rivara =

- Comune
- Comune di Rivara Canavese
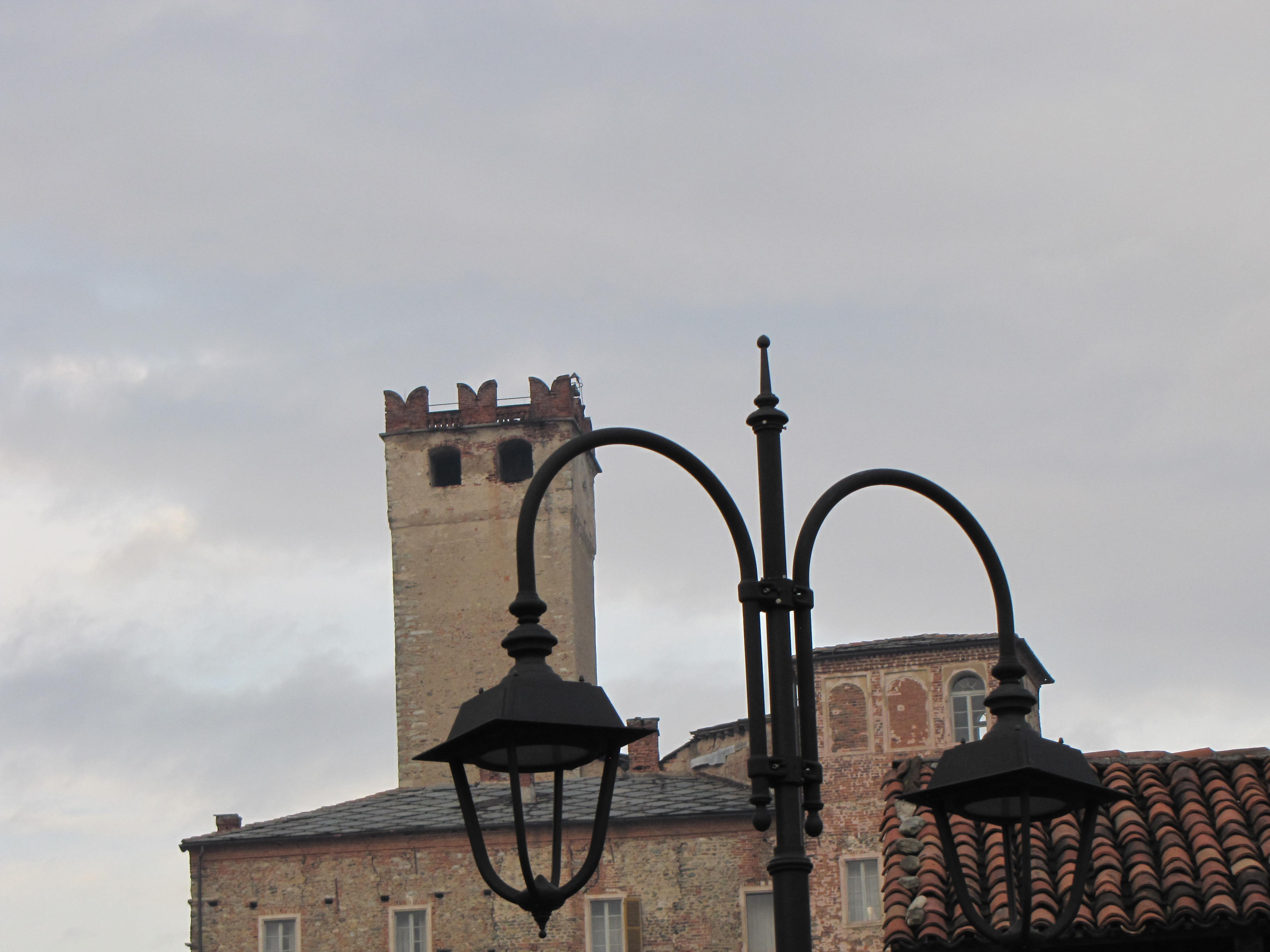
- The Castello Vecchio (Old Castle).

- Coat of arms

- Location within Italy Location within Piedmont
- Coordinates: 45°20′N 7°38′E
- Country: Italy
- Region: Piedmont
- Metropolitan city: Turin (TO)

Government
  - Mayor: Roberto Andriollo

Area
  - Total: 12.4 km^{2} (4.8 sq mi)
- Elevation: 392 m (1,286 ft)

Population (31 December 2010)
  - Total: 2,721
  - Density: 219/km^{2} (568/sq mi)
- Demonym: Rivaresi
- Time zone: UTC+1 (CET)
  - Summer (DST): UTC+2 (CEST)
- Postal code: 10080
- Dialing code: 0124
- Patron saint: St. John the Baptist

Rivara is a comune (municipality) in the Metropolitan City of Turin in the Canavese area of the Italian region of Piedmont, located about 40 kilometres (25 mi) north of Turin.

Rivara is first mentioned in a patent signed by the Holy Roman Emperor Henry II in 1014.

The coat of arms of Rivara shows eleven hills and a comet accompanied by the Latin motto salubrior hisce montibus aer. The reference to the salubrious mountain air is due to the village hilly location.

== Main sights ==
The village has two castles, the Old Castle and the New Castle. The Old Castle dates from the Middles Ages, and it belonged to the Counts of Valperga. It has kept two towers, one of which is crenellated and features several brick Gothic windows.

The New Castle underwent a lot of refurbishment work over the centuries until 1796, when the House of the Counts of Valperga-Rivara became extinct. The new wing that was added in 1835 transformed the building into a rectangular building with a centrally positioned tower. The castle acquired its current appearance when architect Alfredo d'Andrade modified its façade.
