= Cercenasco =

- Comune
- Comune di Cercenasco
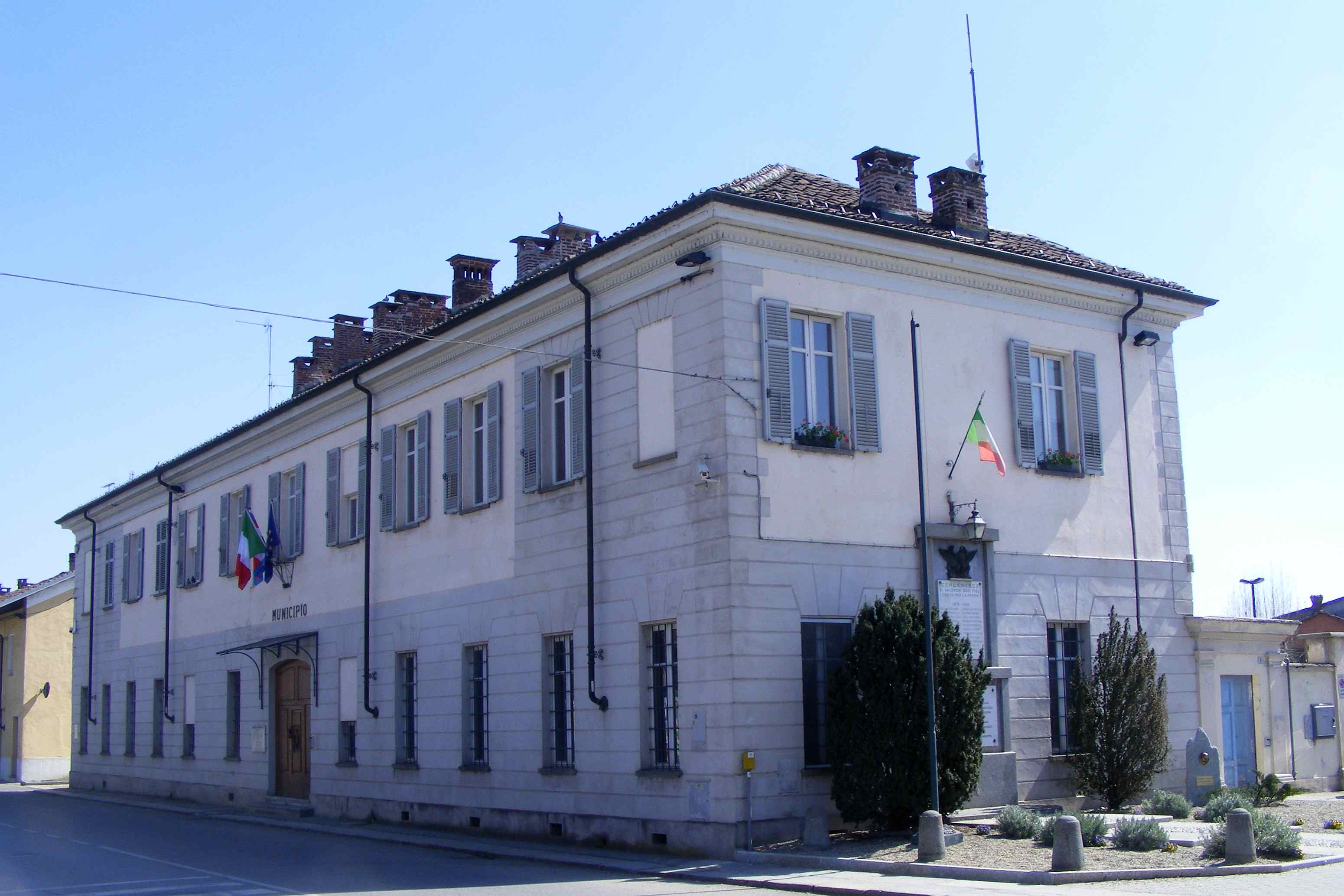
- Town hall.

- Coat of arms

- Location within Italy Location within Piedmont
- Coordinates: 44°52′N 7°30′E
- Country: Italy
- Region: Piedmont
- Metropolitan city: Turin (TO)

Government
  - Mayor: Teresa Rubiano

Area
  - Total: 13.16 km^{2} (5.08 sq mi)
- Elevation: 256 m (840 ft)

Population (30 June 2017)
  - Total: 1,791
  - Density: 136.1/km^{2} (352.5/sq mi)
- Demonym: Cercenaschesi
- Time zone: UTC+1 (CET)
  - Summer (DST): UTC+2 (CEST)
- Postal code: 10060
- Dialing code: 011
- Patron saint: St. Fermin
- Website: Official website

Cercenasco is a comune (municipality) in the Metropolitan City of Turin in the Italian region Piedmont, located about 25 kilometres (16 mi) southwest of Turin, bordering the municipalities of Castagnole Piemonte, Scalenghe, Buriasco, Virle Piemonte and Vigone.
