= Piobesi Torinese =

- Comune
- Comune di Piobesi Torinese
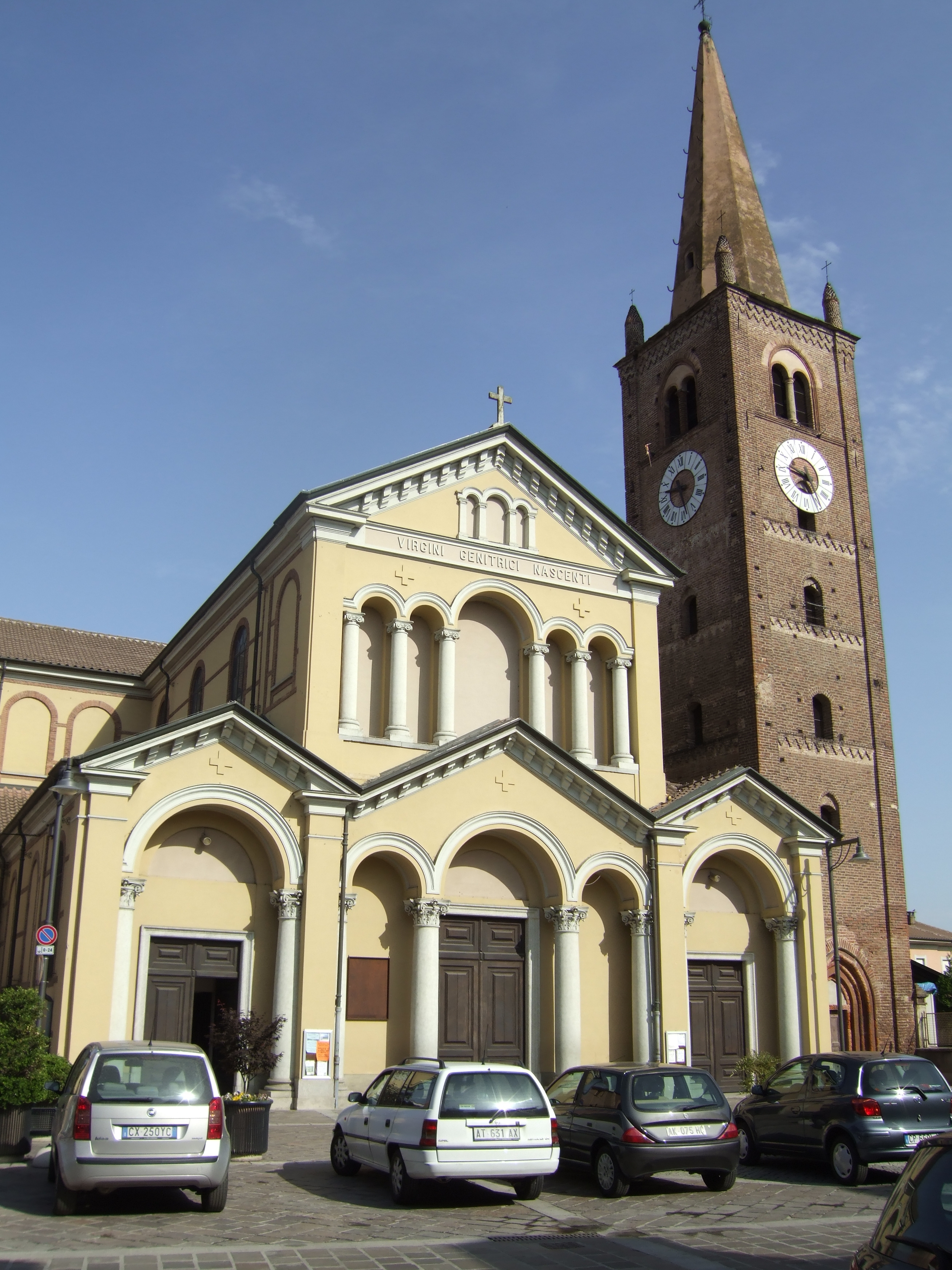
- Parish church.

- Coat of arms

- Location within Italy Location within Piedmont
- Coordinates: 44°56′N 7°37′E
- Country: Italy
- Region: Piedmont
- Metropolitan city: Turin (TO)
- Frazioni: Tetti Cavalloni

Government
  - Mayor: Luciano Bollati

Area
  - Total: 19.7 km^{2} (7.6 sq mi)
- Elevation: 233 m (764 ft)

Population (31 December 2010)
  - Total: 3,723
  - Density: 189/km^{2} (489/sq mi)
- Demonym: Piobesini
- Time zone: UTC+1 (CET)
  - Summer (DST): UTC+2 (CEST)
- Postal code: 10040
- Dialing code: 011

Piobesi Torinese is a comune (municipality) in the Metropolitan City of Turin in the Italian region Piedmont, located about 15 km southwest of Turin.

Piobesi Torinese borders the following municipalities: Candiolo, None, Vinovo, Castagnole Piemonte, and Carignano.
