= Virle Piemonte =

- Comune
- Comune di Virle Piemonte
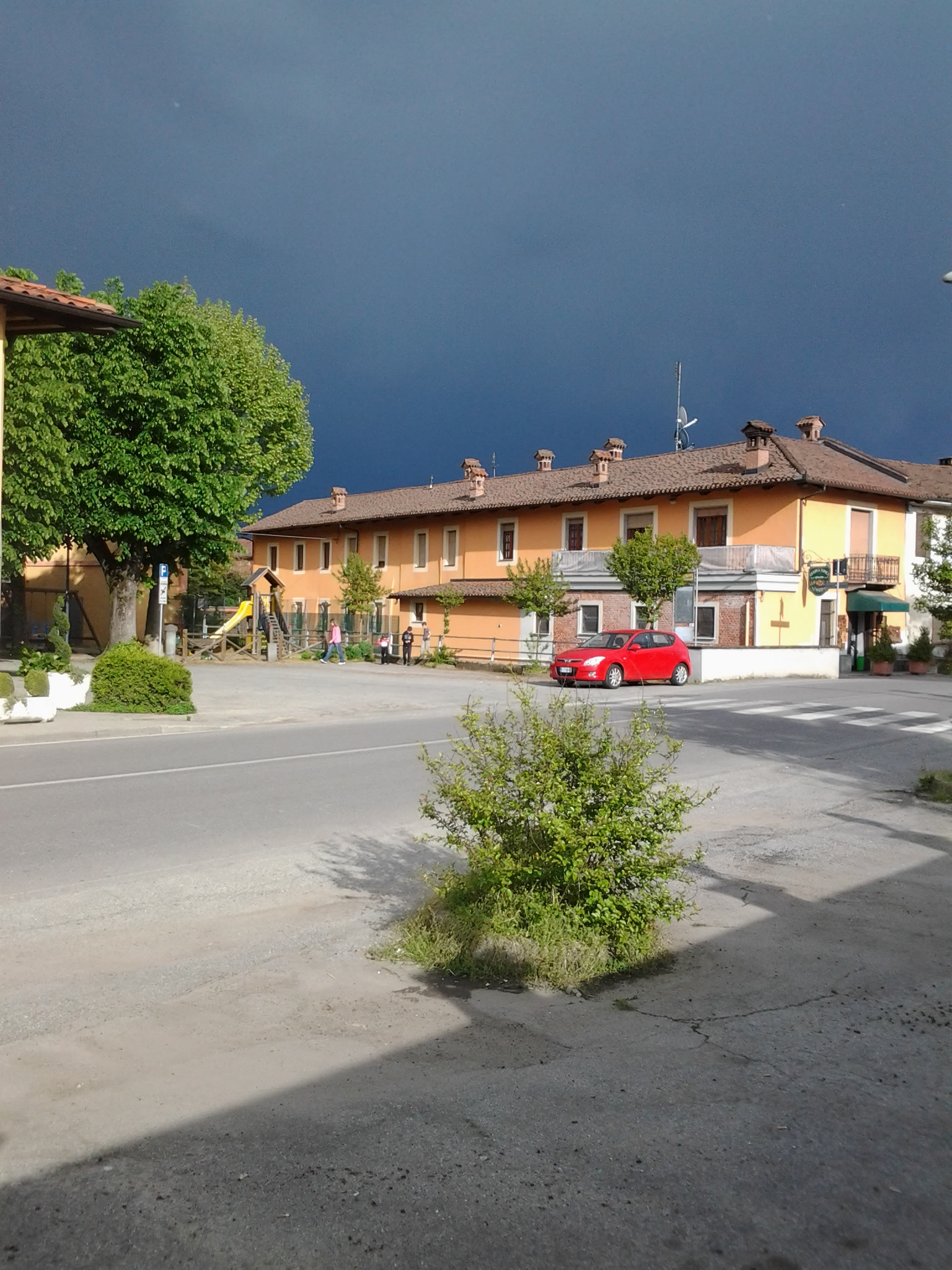

- Location within Italy Location within Piedmont
- Coordinates: 44°52′N 7°34′E
- Country: Italy
- Region: Piedmont
- Metropolitan city: Turin (TO)

Government
  - Mayor: Mattia Robasto

Area
  - Total: 14.1 km^{2} (5.4 sq mi)
- Elevation: 245 m (804 ft)

Population (31 December 2010)
  - Total: 1,212
  - Density: 86.0/km^{2} (223/sq mi)
- Demonym: Virlesi
- Time zone: UTC+1 (CET)
  - Summer (DST): UTC+2 (CEST)
- Postal code: 10060
- Dialing code: 011
- Website: Official website

Virle Piemonte is a comune (municipality) in the Metropolitan City of Turin in the Italian region Piedmont, located about 25 kilometres (16 mi) southwest of Turin. It is located on the left bank of the Lemina torrent.

Virle Piemonte borders the following municipalities: Castagnole Piemonte, Osasio, Cercenasco, Vigone, and Pancalieri.
