= Scalenghe =

- Comune
- Comune di Scalenghe
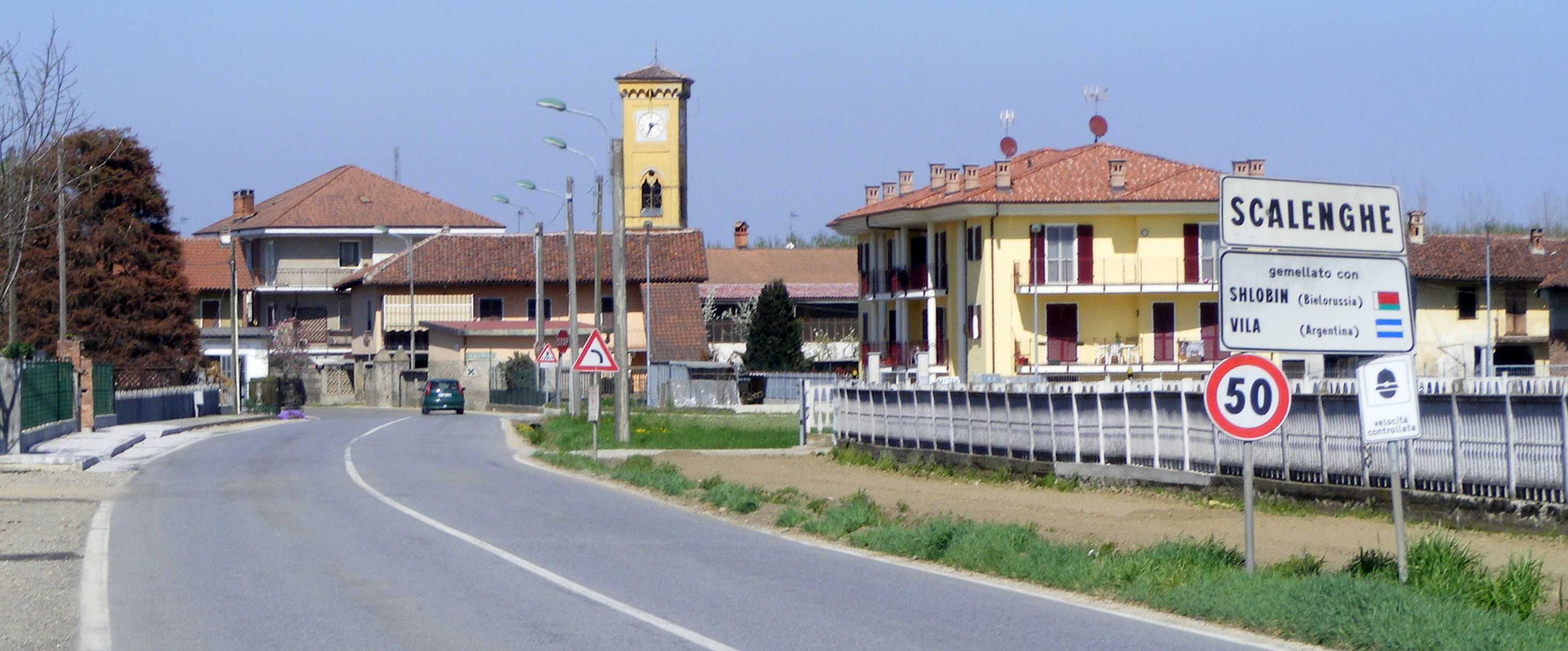

- Location within Italy Location within Piedmont
- Coordinates: 44°53′N 7°30′E
- Country: Italy
- Region: Piedmont
- Metropolitan city: Turin (TO)
- Frazioni: Bicocca, Murisenghi, Pieve, Viotto

Government
  - Mayor: Carla Peiretti

Area
  - Total: 31.7 km^{2} (12.2 sq mi)
- Elevation: 262 m (860 ft)

Population (30 June 2011)
  - Total: 3,325
  - Density: 105/km^{2} (272/sq mi)
- Demonym: Scalenghesi
- Time zone: UTC+1 (CET)
  - Summer (DST): UTC+2 (CEST)
- Postal code: 10060
- Dialing code: 011
- Website: Official website

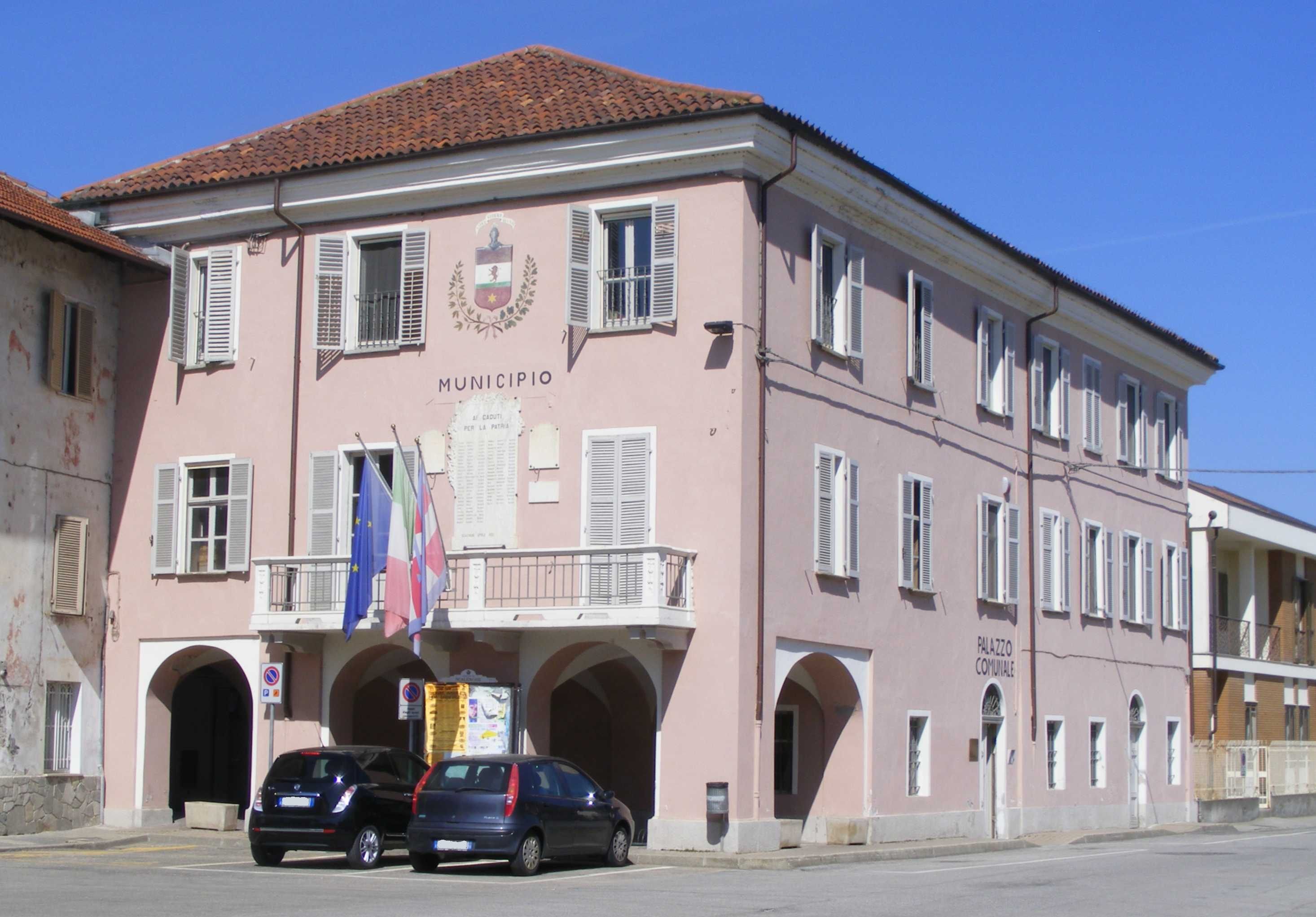
Scalenghe municipality

Scalenghe is a comune (municipality) in the Metropolitan City of Turin in the Italian region of Piedmont, about 25 kilometres (16 mi) southwest of Turin, bordering the municipalities of None, Pinerolo, Airasca, Piscina, Castagnole Piemonte, Buriasco and Cercenasco.

== Twin towns ==
- Vila, Argentina
- Žlobin, Belarus.
