= Macello =

- Comune
- Comune di Macello
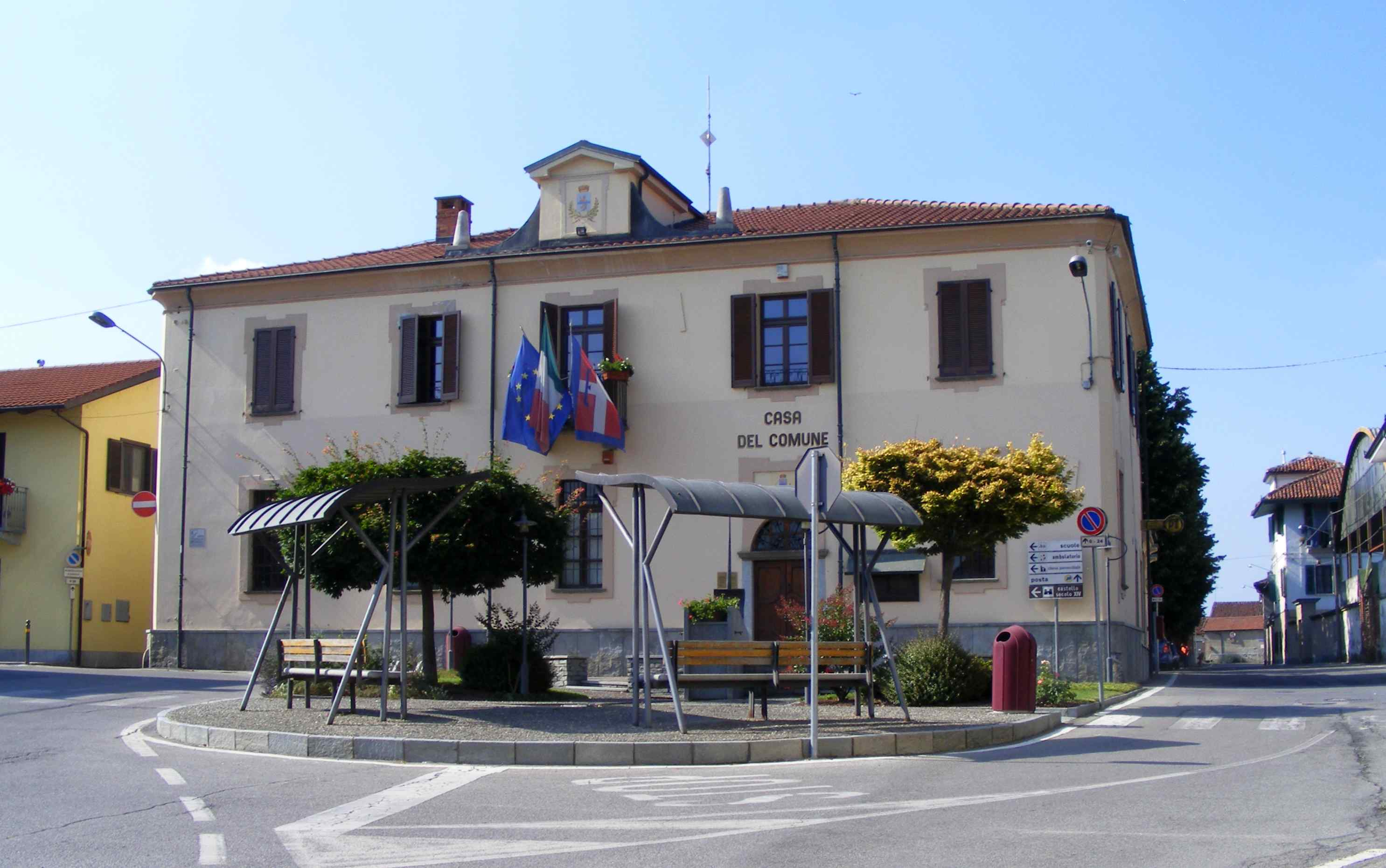
- Town hall

- Location within Italy Location within Piedmont
- Coordinates: 44°51′N 7°24′E
- Country: Italy
- Region: Piedmont
- Metropolitan city: Turin (TO)

Government
  - Mayor: Christian Bertone

Area
  - Total: 14.1 km^{2} (5.4 sq mi)
- Elevation: 301 m (988 ft)

Population (30 September 2017)
  - Total: 1,184
  - Density: 84.0/km^{2} (217/sq mi)
- Demonym: Triestini
- Time zone: UTC+1 (CET)
  - Summer (DST): UTC+2 (CEST)
- Postal code: 34100
- Website: Official website

Macello is a comune (municipality) in the Metropolitan City of Turin in the Italian region Piedmont, located about 35 kilometres (22 mi) southwest of Turin.

Macello borders the following municipalities: Pinerolo, Buriasco, Vigone, Garzigliana, and Cavour.
