= Garzigliana =

- Comune
- Comune di Garzigliana
- Location within Italy Location within Piedmont
- Coordinates: 44°50′N 7°22′E
- Country: Italy
- Region: Piedmont
- Metropolitan city: Turin (TO)
- Frazioni: Alberetti, San Martino, Santa Marta, Montebruno, Case Nuove, Conti, Baite

Government
  - Mayor: Lidia Alloa

Area
  - Total: 7.4 km^{2} (2.9 sq mi)
- Elevation: 314 m (1,030 ft)

Population (30 December 2017)
  - Total: 539
  - Density: 73/km^{2} (190/sq mi)
- Demonym: Garziglianesi
- Time zone: UTC+1 (CET)
  - Summer (DST): UTC+2 (CEST)
- Postal code: 10060
- Dialing code: 0121

Garzigliana is a comune (municipality) in the Metropolitan City of Turin in the Italian region Piedmont, located about 35 kilometres (22 mi) southwest of Turin.

Garzigliana borders the following municipalities: Pinerolo, Osasco, Macello, Bricherasio, and Cavour.

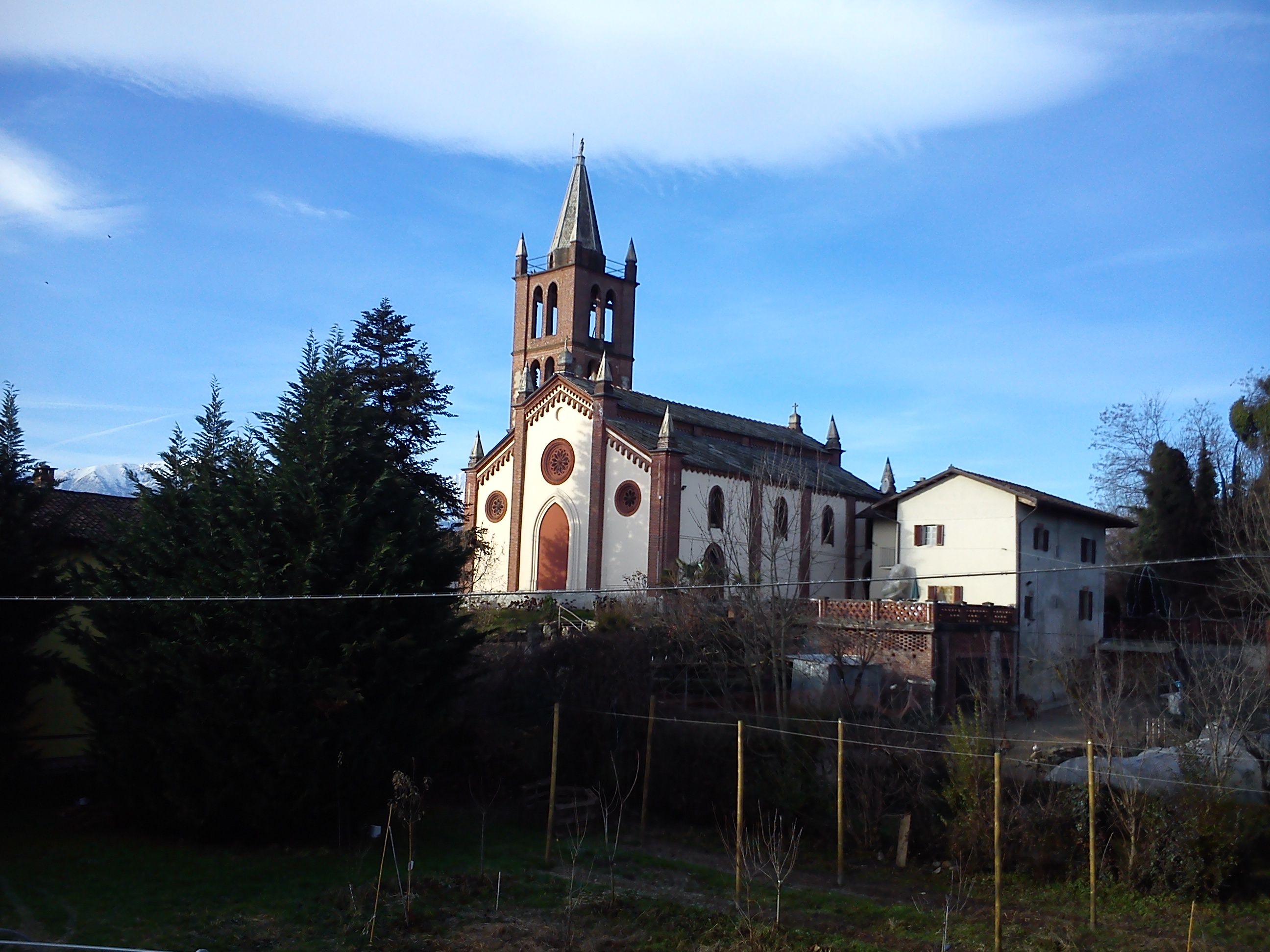
The sanctuary of Montebruno in the municipality of Garzigliana in the province of Turin, Piedmont
