= Bibiana, Piedmont =

Bibiana
- Comune
- Comune di Bibiana
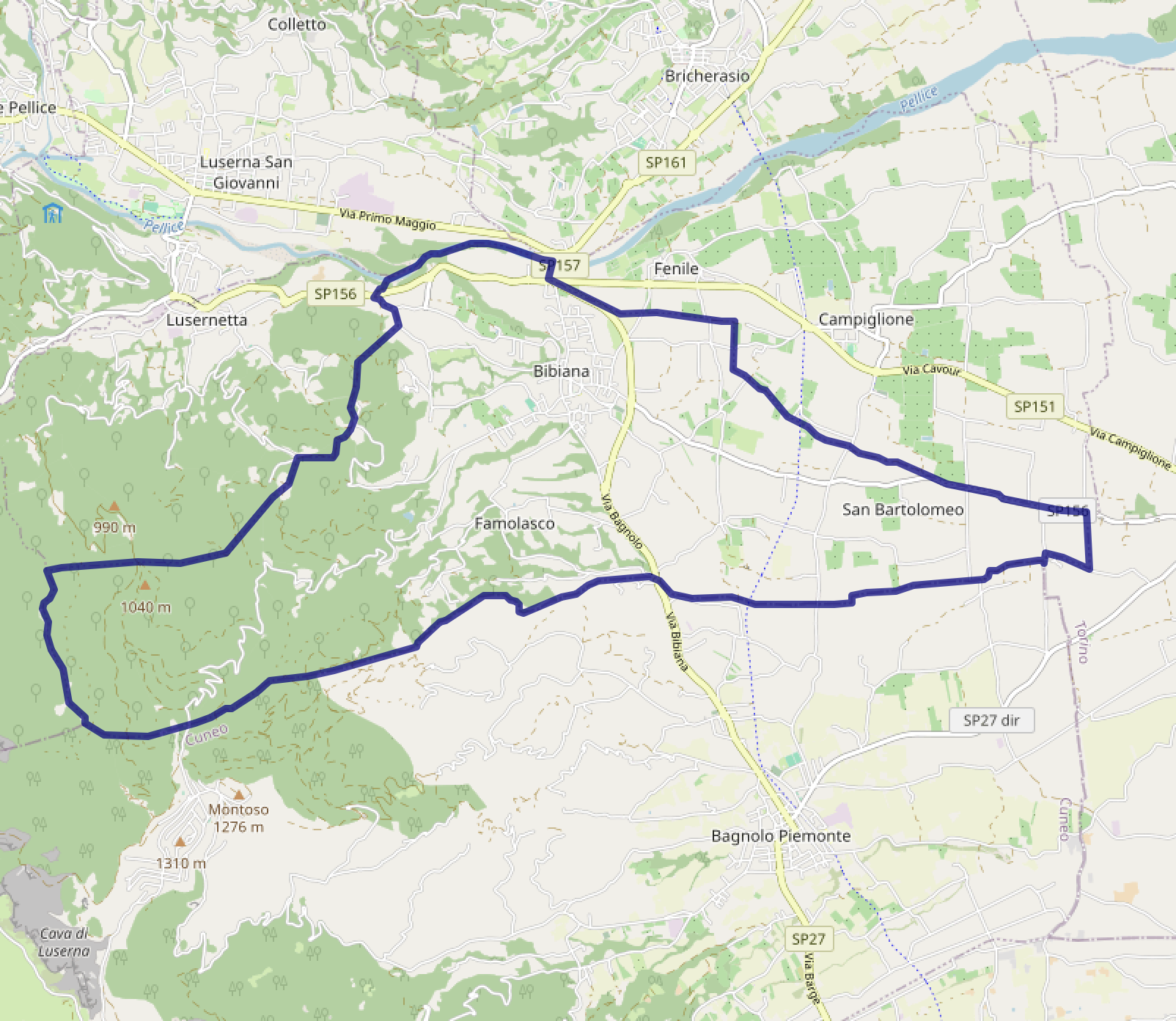
- OSM map of Bibiana.

- Location within Italy Location within Piedmont
- Coordinates: 44°48′N 7°17′E
- Country: Italy
- Region: Piedmont
- Metropolitan city: Turin (TO)
- Frazioni: Famolasco, Madonna delle Grazie

Government
  - Mayor: Fabio Rossetto

Area
  - Total: 18.60 km^{2} (7.18 sq mi)
- Elevation: 420 m (1,380 ft)

Population (30 November 2017)
  - Total: 3,466
  - Density: 186.3/km^{2} (482.6/sq mi)
- Demonym: Bibianesi
- Time zone: UTC+1 (CET)
  - Summer (DST): UTC+2 (CEST)
- Postal code: 10060
- Dialing code: 0121
- Website: Official website

Bibiana (French: Bibiane) is a comune (municipality) in the Metropolitan City of Turin in the Italian region Piedmont, located about 45 kilometres (28 mi) southwest of Turin.

Bibiana borders the following municipalities: Bricherasio, Luserna San Giovanni, Cavour, Campiglione-Fenile, Lusernetta, and Bagnolo Piemonte.

In 2019, it becomes famous as the location of a Franco-Italian wedding.
