= Vigone =

- Comune
- Comune di Vigone
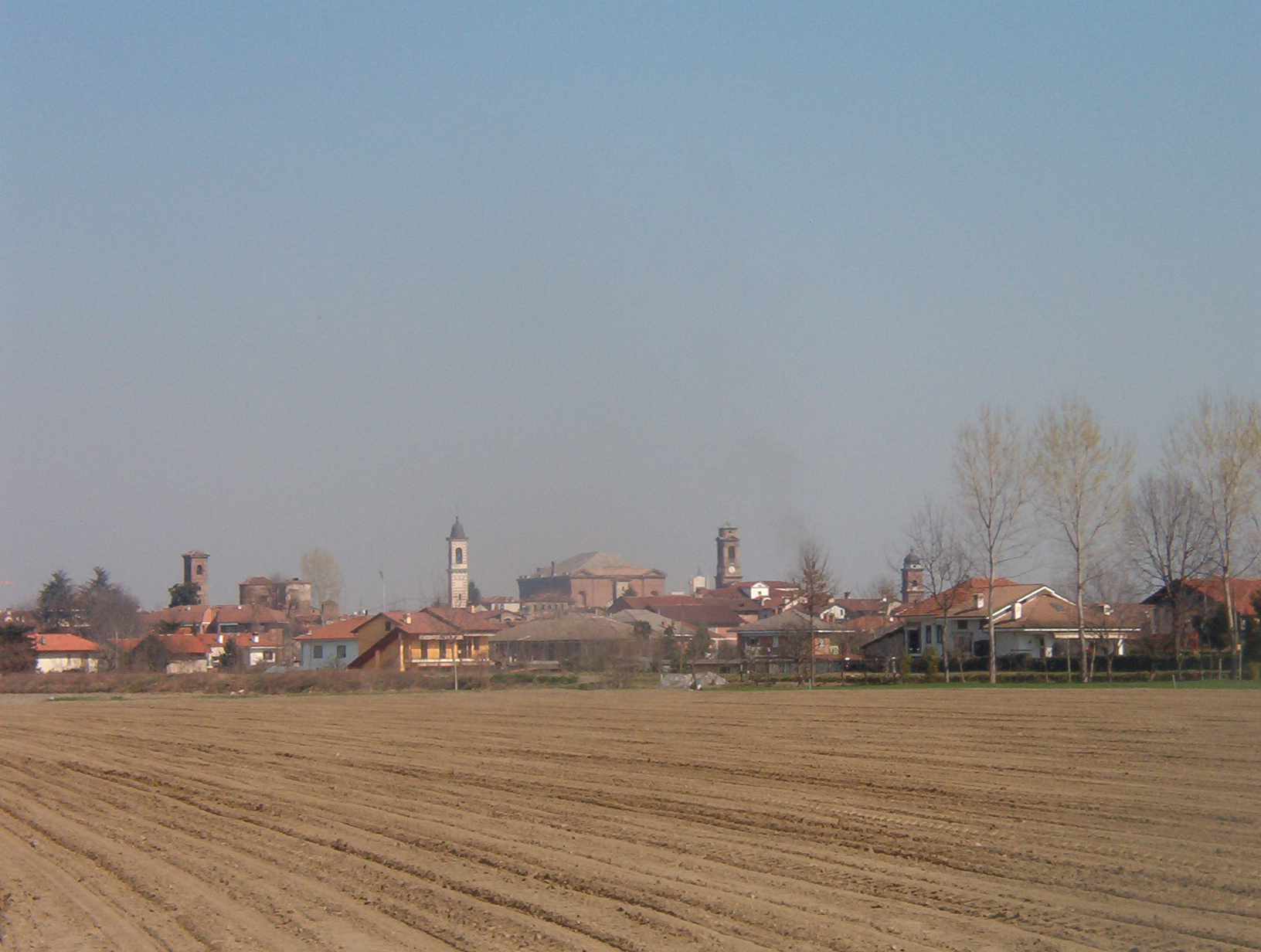

- Location within Italy Location within Piedmont
- Coordinates: 44°51′N 7°30′E
- Country: Italy
- Region: Piedmont
- Metropolitan city: Turin (TO)
- Frazioni: Angiale Bassa, Graneris, Gunia Alta, Maniciarda, Quintanello, Ruscala, Trepellice, Via Vecchia, Zucchea.

Government
  - Mayor: Fabio Cerato

Area
  - Total: 40.62 km^{2} (15.68 sq mi)
- Elevation: 260 m (850 ft)

Population (1 January 2025)
  - Total: 5,061
  - Density: 124.6/km^{2} (322.7/sq mi)
- Demonym: Vigonese(i)
- Time zone: UTC+1 (CET)
  - Summer (DST): UTC+2 (CEST)
- Postal code: 10067
- Dialing code: 011
- Patron saint: San Nicola da Tolentino
- Saint day: Second sunday of September
- Website: Official website

Vigone is a comune (municipality) in the Metropolitan City of Turin in the Italian region Piedmont, located about 30 kilometres (19 mi) southwest of Turin.

Vigone borders the following municipalities: Buriasco, Virle Piemonte, Cercenasco, Macello, Pancalieri, Cavour, and Villafranca Piemonte.

== Twin towns and sister cities ==
Vigone is twinned with:

- Cañada Rosquín, Argentina
