= Metropolitan City of Turin =

City in the Piedmont region of Italy

Metropolitan City of Turin: Città metropolitana di Torino (Italian); Sità metropolitan-a 'd Turin (Piedmontese)
- Metropolitan city
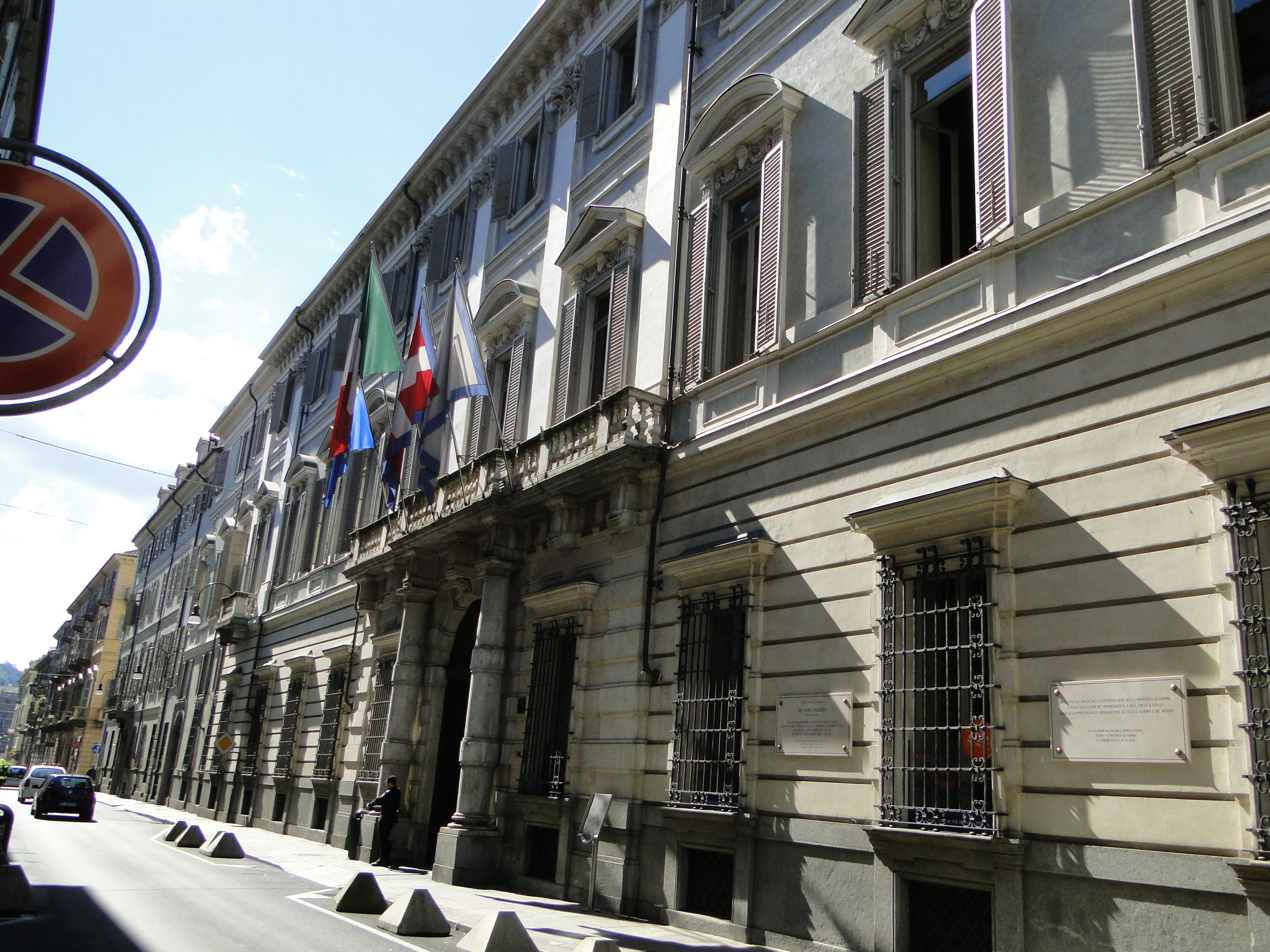
- Palazzo Cisterna in Turin, the provincial seat

- Flag Coat of arms

- Location of the Metropolitan City of Turin in Italy
- Coordinates: 45.0667°N 7.7000°E
- Country: Italy
- Region: Piedmont
- Established: 1 January 2015
- Capital(s): Turin
- Municipalities: 312

Government
  - Metropolitan mayor: Stefano Lo Russo (PD)

Area
  - Total: 6,827.00 km^{2} (2,635.92 sq mi)

Population (2026)
  - Total: 2,204,779
  - Density: 322.950/km^{2} (836.436/sq mi)

GDP
  - Metro: €69.305 billion (2015)
  - Per capita: €30,304 (2015)
- Time zone: UTC+1 (CET)
  - Summer (DST): UTC+2 (CEST)
- Postal code: 10121-10156 (Turin); 10010-10099 (other municipalities)
- Telephone prefix: 011, 0121, 0122, 0123, 0124, 0125, 0161
- ISO 3166 code: IT-TO
- Vehicle registration: TO
- ISTAT code: 201
- Website: www.cittametropolitana.torino.it/cms

The Metropolitan City of Turin (Italian: città metropolitana di Torino; Piedmontese: sità metropolitan-a 'd Turin) is a metropolitan city in the Piedmont region of Italy. Its capital is the city of Turin. It replaced the province of Turin and comprises 312 comuni (sing.: comune). It was created by the reform of local authorities (Law 142/1990) and established by the Law 56/2014. It has been officially operating since 1 January 2015. With a population of 2,204,779, it is the 4th most populous metropolitan city in Italy.

The Metropolitan City of Turin is headed by the Metropolitan Mayor (sindaco metropolitano) and by the Metropolitan Council (consiglio metropolitano). Since 27 October 2021, Stefano Lo Russo has served as the mayor of the capital city, succeeding Chiara Appendino. The largest metropolitan city of Italy, it is the only one to border a foreign state, France.

== Geography ==
It has an area of 6,827 km^{2} (2,636 sq mi). There are 312 municipalities in the metropolitan area – the most of any province or metropolitan city in Italy. The province with the second highest number of municipalities is Cuneo with 250.

The territory consists of a mountainous area to the west and north along the border with France and with the Valle d'Aosta, and part that is flat or hilly in the south and east. The mountainous part is home to part of the Hautes Alpes, the Graian Alps and, to a much lesser extent, the Pennine Alps. The highest point in the Metropolitan City of Turin is the Roc (4,026 m), located in the Gran Paradiso Massif on the border with Valle d'Aosta.

Several wildlife reserves are located in the province, including the Sacro Monte Natural Reserve in Belmonte and the Gran Paradiso National Park. The Residences of the Royal House of Savoy, located in Turin and several other towns in the province, as well as the Sacro Monte di Belmonte, are UNESCO World Heritage Sites.

== Demographics ==
As of 2026, the population is 2,204,779, of which 48.8% are male, and 51.2% are female. Minors make up 13.8% of the population, and seniors make up 26.9%.

Historical population

Year	Pop.	±%
1861	861,994	—
1871	919,252	+6.6%
1881	978,547	+6.5%
1901	1,062,940	+8.6%
1911	1,144,474	+7.7%
1921	1,208,398	+5.6%
1931	1,296,347	+7.3%
1936	1,312,324	+1.2%

Year	Pop.	±%
1951	1,433,001	+9.2%
1961	1,824,254	+27.3%
1971	2,287,016	+25.4%
1981	2,345,771	+2.6%
1991	2,236,765	−4.6%
2001	2,165,619	−3.2%
2011	2,247,780	+3.8%
2021	2,208,370	−1.8%

Source: ISTAT

=== Immigration ===
As of 2025, immigrants make up 12.6% of the population. The 5 largest foreign countries of birth are Romania, Morocco, Peru, Albania, and Moldova.

== Government ==
=== List of metropolitan mayors ===
	Metropolitan Mayor	Term start	Term end	Party
1	Piero Fassino	1 January 2015	30 June 2016	PD
2	Chiara Appendino	30 June 2016	27 October 2021	M5S
3	Stefano Lo Russo	27 October 2021	Incumbent	PD

=== Metropolitan Council ===
The new metro municipalities, giving large urban areas the administrative powers of a province, are conceived for improving the performance of local administrations and to slash local spending by better coordinating the municipalities in providing basic services (including transport, school and social programs) and environment protection. In this policy framework, the Mayor of Turin is designated to exercise the functions of Metropolitan mayor, presiding over a Metropolitan Council formed by 18 mayors of municipalities within the Metro municipality.

The first Metropolitan Council of the City was elected on 12 October 2014:

Group	Seats
PD	13 / 18
M5S	2 / 18
FI	1 / 18
NCD	1 / 18
Others	1 / 18

=== Municipalities ===
The metropolitan city has 312 municipalities:

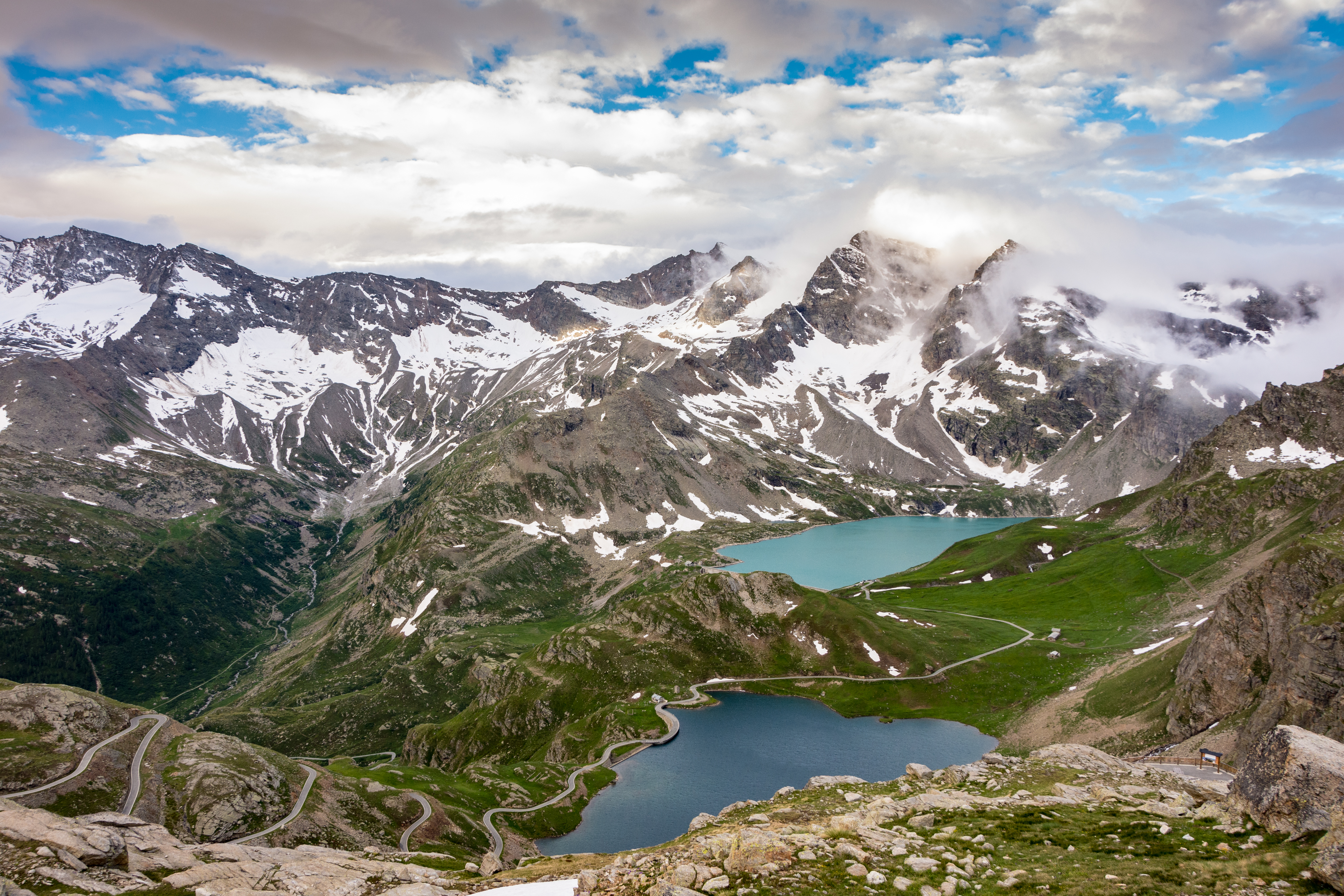
Gran Paradiso National Park

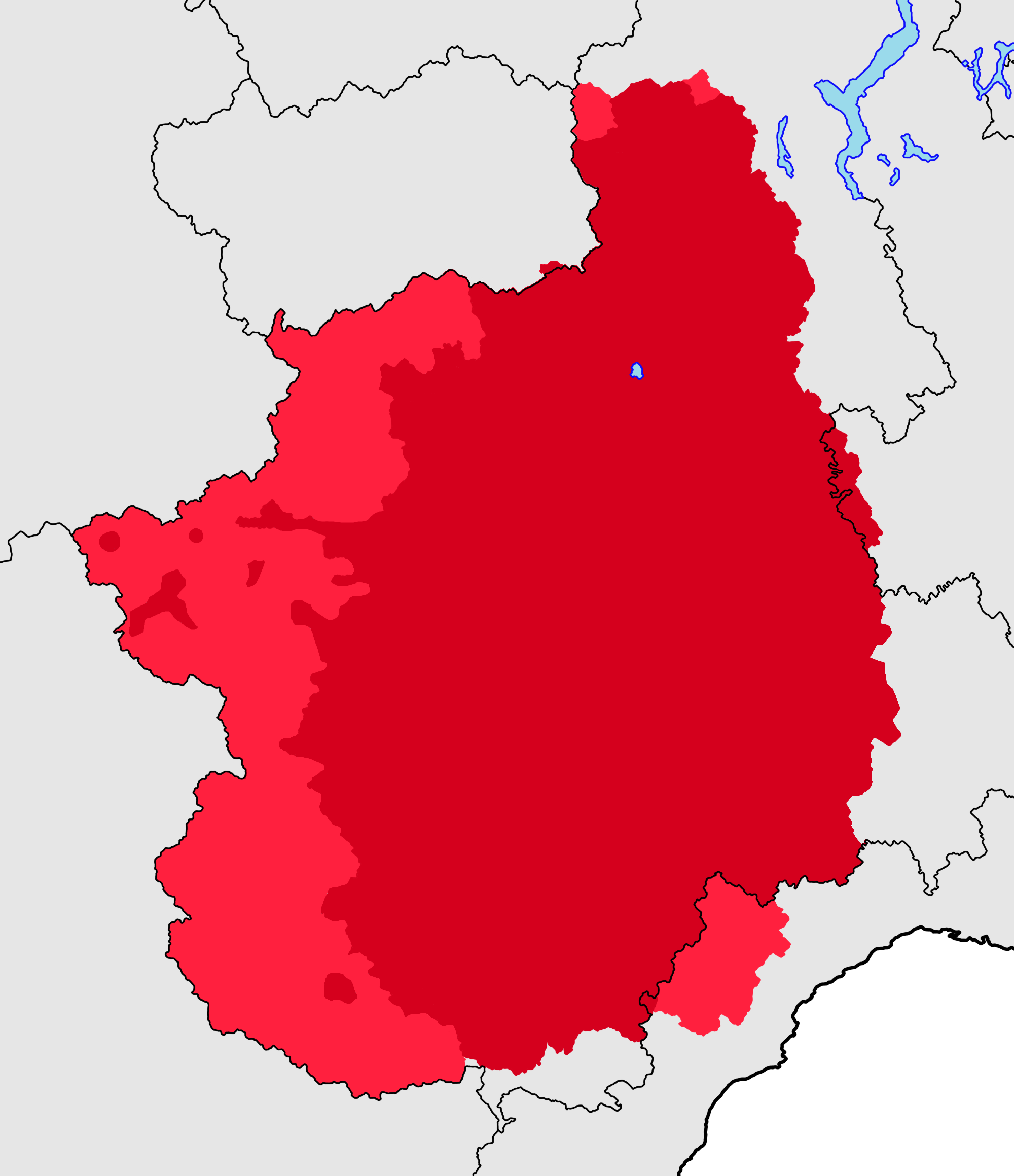
Piedmontese language: Areas where Piedmontese is spoken (municipalities where Occitan and Arpitan presence is only de jure are included) Areas where Piedmontese is spoken alongside other languages (Occitan, Arpitan and Alemannic) and areas of linguistic transition (with Ligurian and with Lombard)

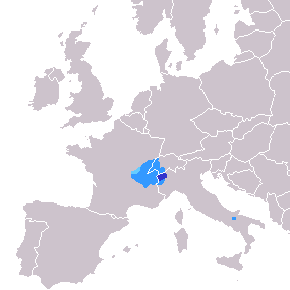
Franco-Provençal: dark blue: official recognition; medium blue: traditional domain of the language; light blue: historical transition zone

- Agliè
- Airasca
- Ala di Stura
- Albiano d'Ivrea
- Almese
- Alpette
- Alpignano
- Andezeno
- Andrate
- Angrogna
- Arignano
- Avigliana
- Azeglio
- Bairo
- Balangero
- Baldissero Canavese
- Baldissero Torinese
- Balme
- Banchette
- Barbania
- Bardonecchia
- Barone Canavese
- Beinasco
- Bibiana
- Bobbio Pellice
- Bollengo
- Borgaro Torinese
- Borgiallo
- Borgofranco d'Ivrea
- Borgomasino
- Borgone Susa
- Bosconero
- Brandizzo
- Bricherasio
- Brosso
- Brozolo
- Bruino
- Brusasco
- Bruzolo
- Buriasco
- Burolo
- Busano
- Bussoleno
- Buttigliera Alta
- Cafasse
- Caluso
- Cambiano
- Campiglione-Fenile
- Candia Canavese
- Candiolo
- Canischio
- Cantalupa
- Cantoira
- Caprie
- Caravino
- Carema
- Carignano
- Carmagnola
- Casalborgone
- Cascinette d'Ivrea
- Caselette
- Caselle Torinese
- Castagneto Po
- Castagnole Piemonte
- Castellamonte
- Castelnuovo Nigra
- Castiglione Torinese
- Cavagnolo
- Cavour
- Cercenasco
- Ceres
- Ceresole Reale
- Cesana Torinese
- Chialamberto
- Chianocco
- Chiaverano
- Chieri
- Chiesanuova
- Chiomonte
- Chiusa di San Michele
- Chivasso
- Ciconio
- Cintano
- Cinzano
- Cirié
- Claviere
- Coassolo Torinese
- Coazze
- Collegno
- Colleretto Castelnuovo
- Colleretto Giacosa
- Condove
- Corio
- Cossano Canavese
- Cuceglio
- Cumiana
- Cuorgnè
- Druento
- Exilles
- Favria
- Feletto
- Fenestrelle
- Fiano
- Fiorano Canavese
- Foglizzo
- Forno Canavese
- Frassinetto
- Front
- Frossasco
- Garzigliana
- Gassino Torinese
- Germagnano
- Giaglione
- Giaveno
- Givoletto
- Gravere
- Groscavallo
- Grosso
- Grugliasco
- Ingria
- Inverso Pinasca
- Isolabella
- Issiglio
- Ivrea
- La Cassa
- La Loggia
- Lanzo Torinese
- Lauriano
- Leinì
- Lemie
- Lessolo
- Levone
- Locana
- Lombardore
- Lombriasco
- Loranzè
- Luserna San Giovanni
- Lusernetta
- Lusigliè
- Macello
- Maglione
- Mappano
- Marentino
- Massello
- Mathi
- Mattie
- Mazzè
- Meana di Susa
- Mercenasco
- Mezzenile
- Mombello di Torino
- Mompantero
- Monastero di Lanzo
- Moncalieri
- Moncenisio
- Montaldo Torinese
- Montalenghe
- Montalto Dora
- Montanaro
- Monteu da Po
- Moriondo Torinese
- Nichelino
- Noasca
- Nole
- Nomaglio
- None
- Novalesa
- Oglianico
- Orbassano
- Orio Canavese
- Osasco
- Osasio
- Oulx
- Ozegna
- Palazzo Canavese
- Pancalieri
- Parella
- Pavarolo
- Pavone Canavese
- Pecetto Torinese
- Perosa Argentina
- Perosa Canavese
- Perrero
- Pertusio
- Pessinetto
- Pianezza
- Pinasca
- Pinerolo
- Pino Torinese
- Piobesi Torinese
- Piossasco
- Piscina
- Piverone
- Poirino
- Pomaretto
- Pont-Canavese
- Porte
- Pragelato
- Prali
- Pralormo
- Pramollo
- Prarostino
- Prascorsano
- Pratiglione
- Quagliuzzo
- Quassolo
- Quincinetto
- Reano
- Ribordone
- Riva presso Chieri
- Rivalba
- Rivalta di Torino
- Rivara
- Rivarolo Canavese
- Rivarossa
- Rivoli
- Robassomero
- Rocca Canavese
- Roletto
- Romano Canavese
- Ronco Canavese
- Rondissone
- Rorà
- Rosta
- Roure
- Rubiana
- Rueglio
- Salassa
- Salbertrand
- Salerano Canavese
- Salza di Pinerolo
- Samone
- San Benigno Canavese
- San Carlo Canavese
- San Colombano Belmonte
- San Didero
- San Francesco al Campo
- San Germano Chisone
- San Gillio
- San Giorgio Canavese
- San Giorio di Susa
- San Giusto Canavese
- San Martino Canavese
- San Maurizio Canavese
- San Mauro Torinese
- San Pietro Val Lemina
- San Ponso
- San Raffaele Cimena
- San Sebastiano da Po
- San Secondo di Pinerolo
- Sangano
- Sant'Ambrogio di Torino
- Sant'Antonino di Susa
- Santena
- Sauze d'Oulx
- Sauze di Cesana
- Scalenghe
- Scarmagno
- Sciolze
- Sestriere
- Settimo Rottaro
- Settimo Torinese
- Settimo Vittone
- Sparone
- Strambinello
- Strambino
- Susa
- Tavagnasco
- Torrazza Piemonte
- Torre Canavese
- Torre Pellice
- Trana
- Traversella
- Traves
- Trofarello
- Turin
- Usseaux
- Usseglio
- Vaie
- Val della Torre
- Val di Chy
- Valchiusa
- Valgioie
- Vallo Torinese
- Valperga
- Valprato Soana
- Varisella
- Vauda Canavese
- Venaria Reale
- Venaus
- Verolengo
- Verrua Savoia
- Vestignè
- Vialfrè
- Vidracco
- Vigone
- Villafranca Piemonte
- Villanova Canavese
- Villar Dora
- Villar Focchiardo
- Villar Pellice
- Villar Perosa
- Villarbasse
- Villareggia
- Villastellone
- Vinovo
- Virle Piemonte
- Vische
- Vistrorio
- Viù
- Volpiano
- Volvera
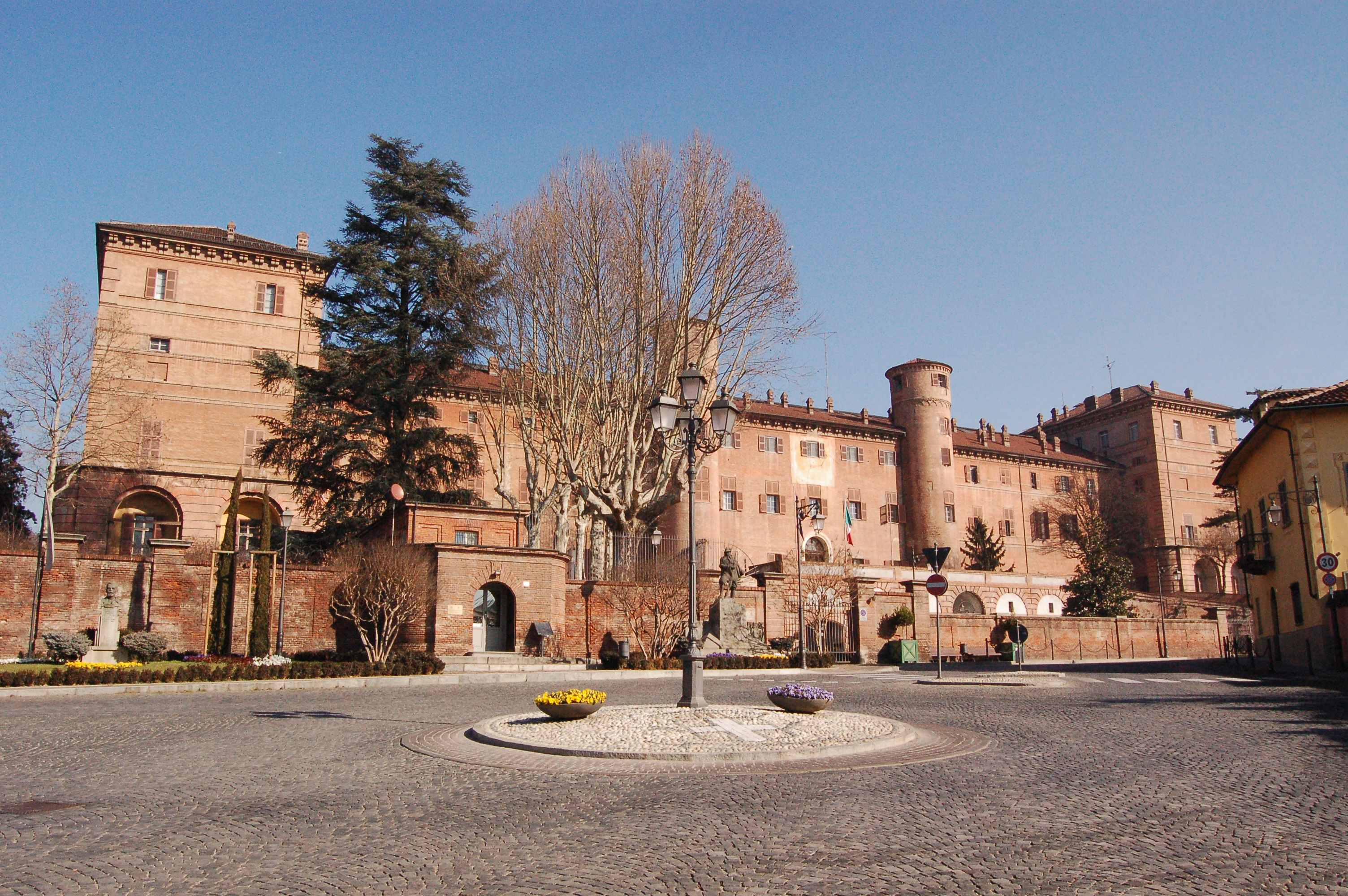
Moncalieri

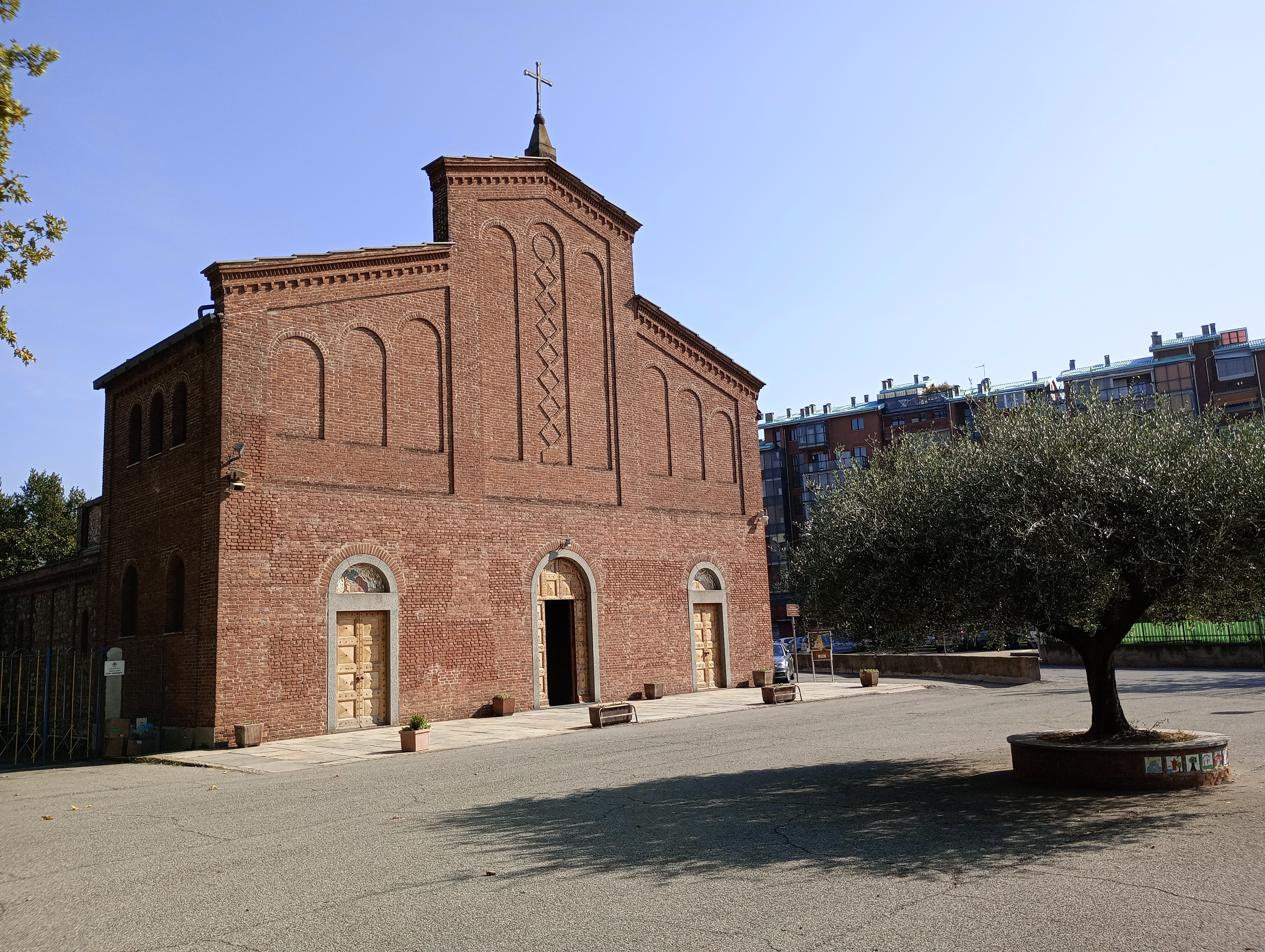
Collegno

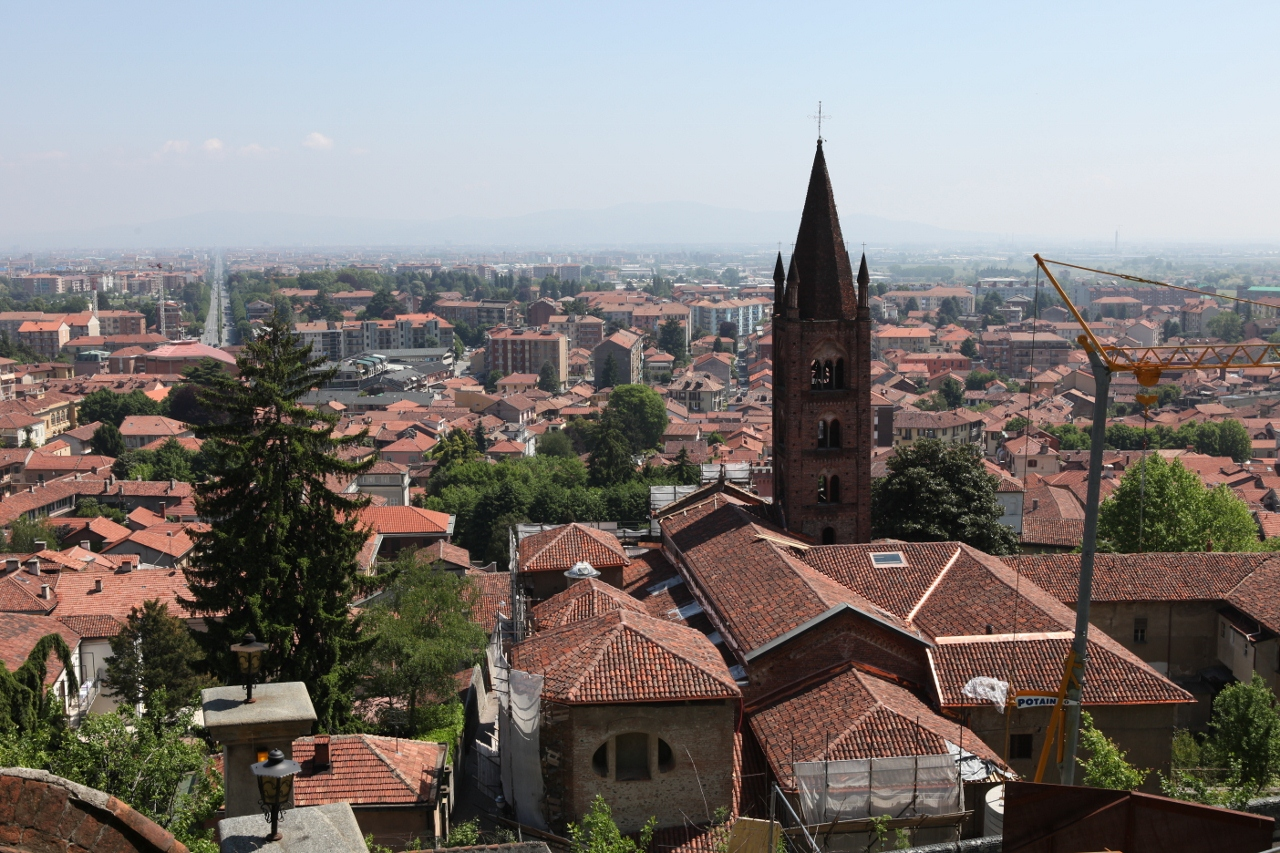
Rivoli

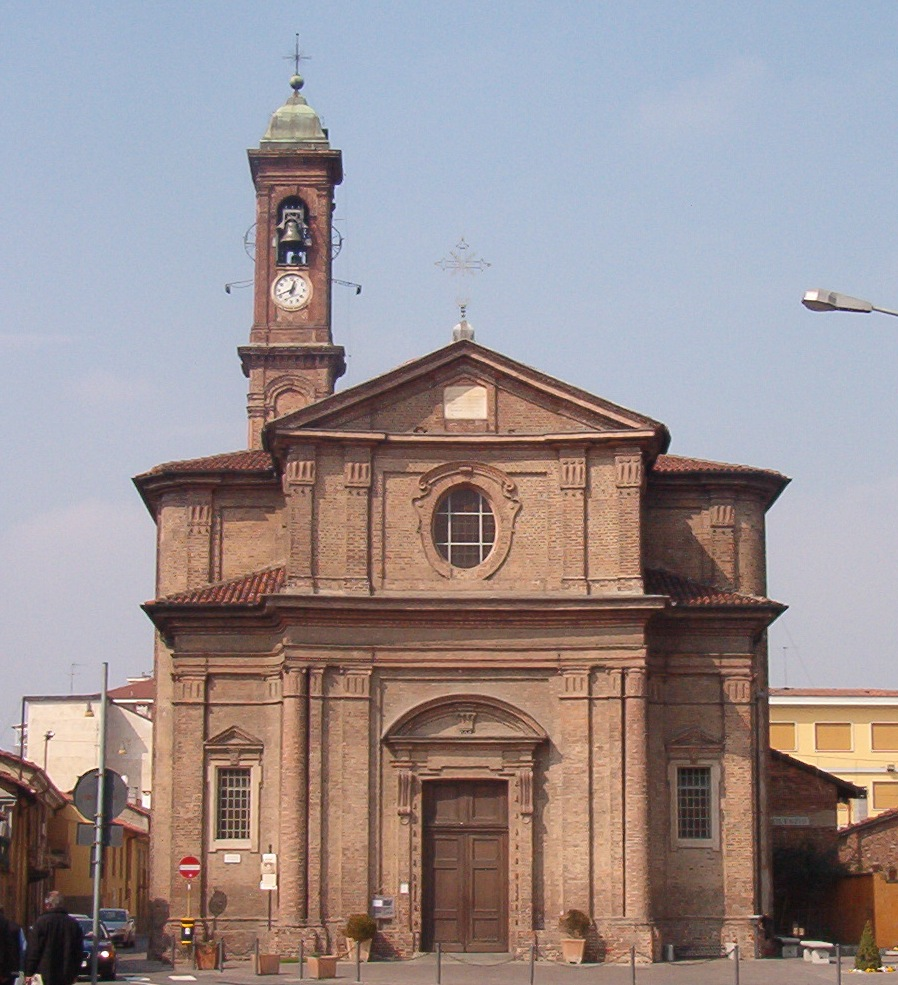
Nichelino

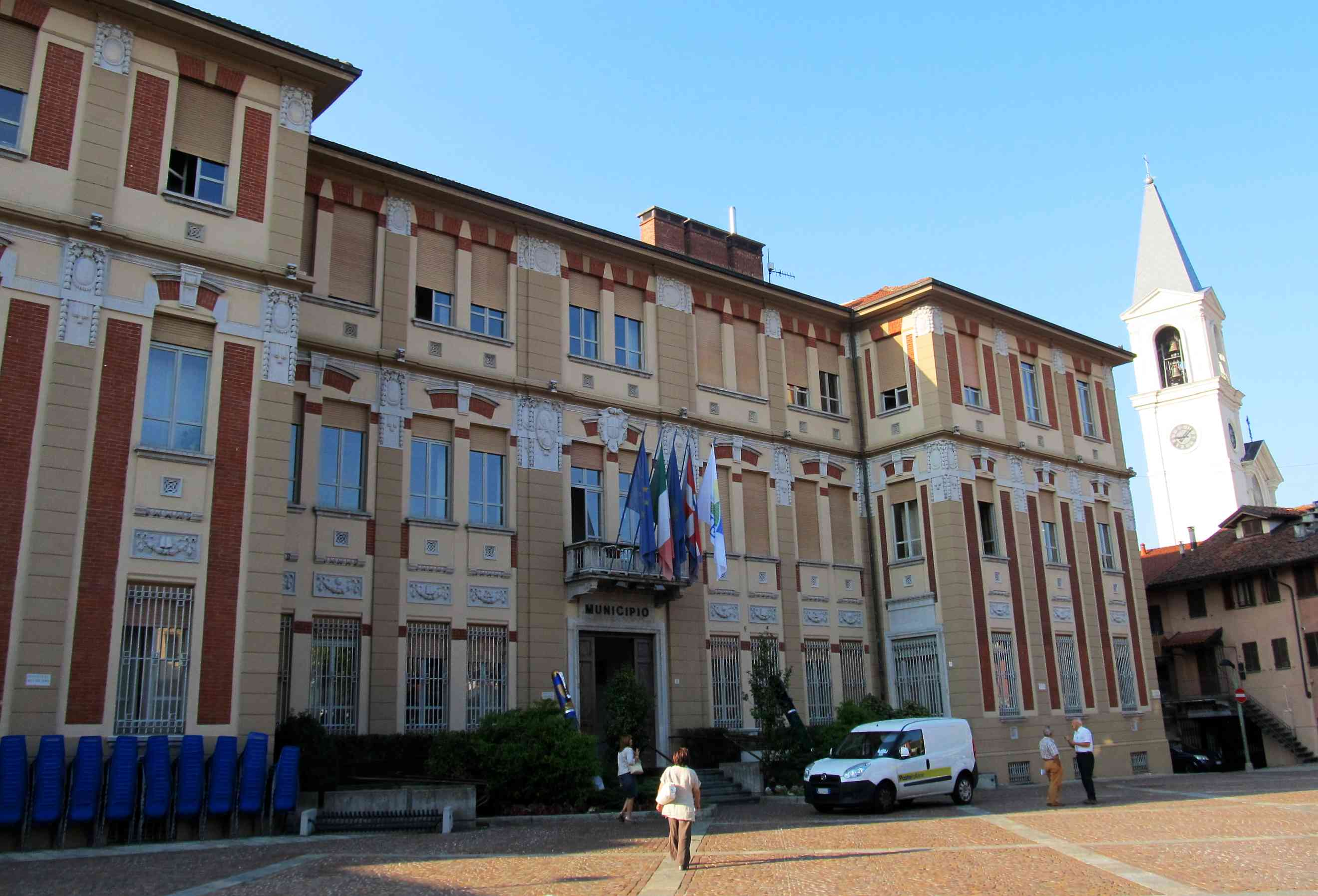
Settimo Torinese

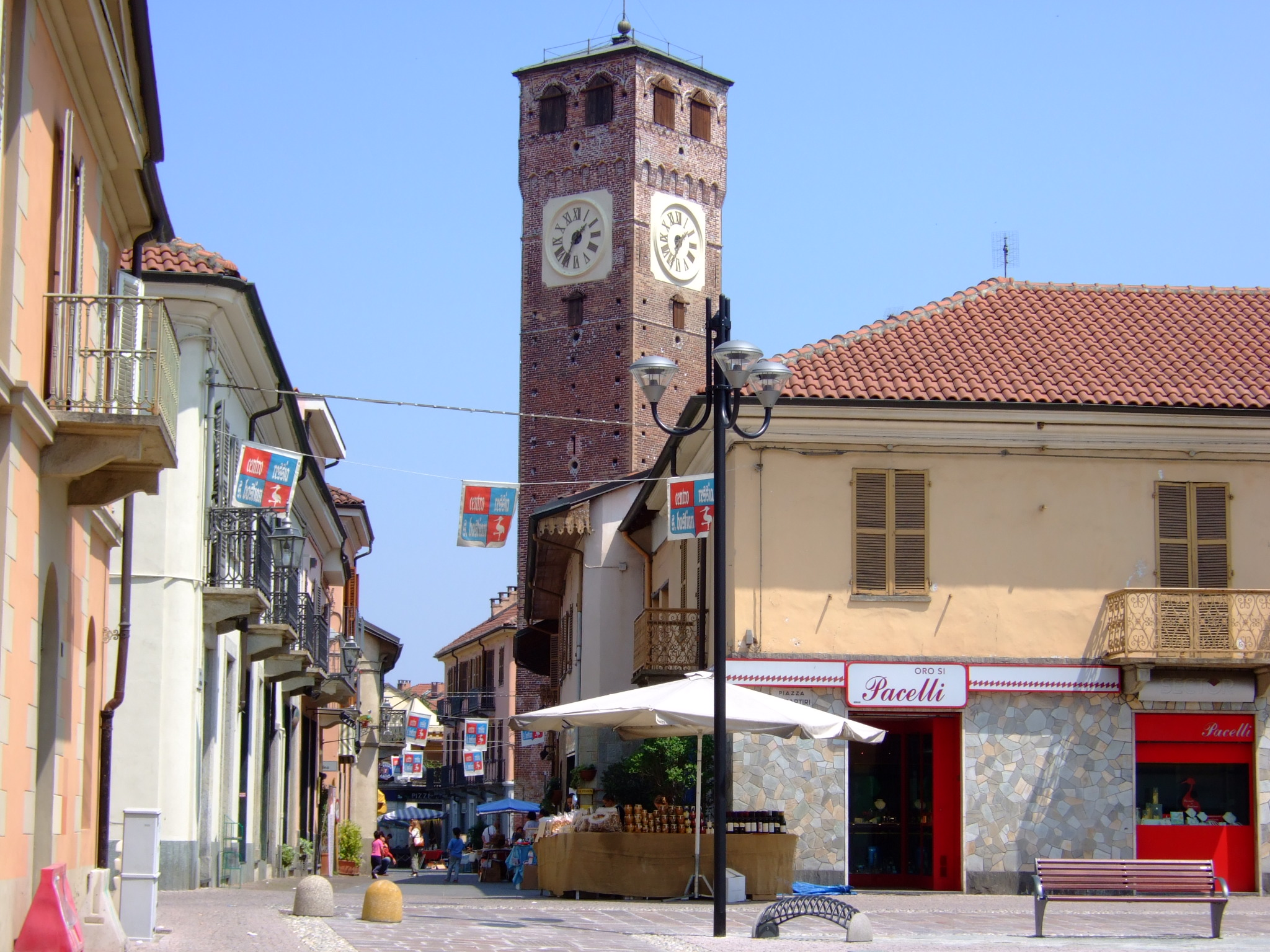
Grugliasco

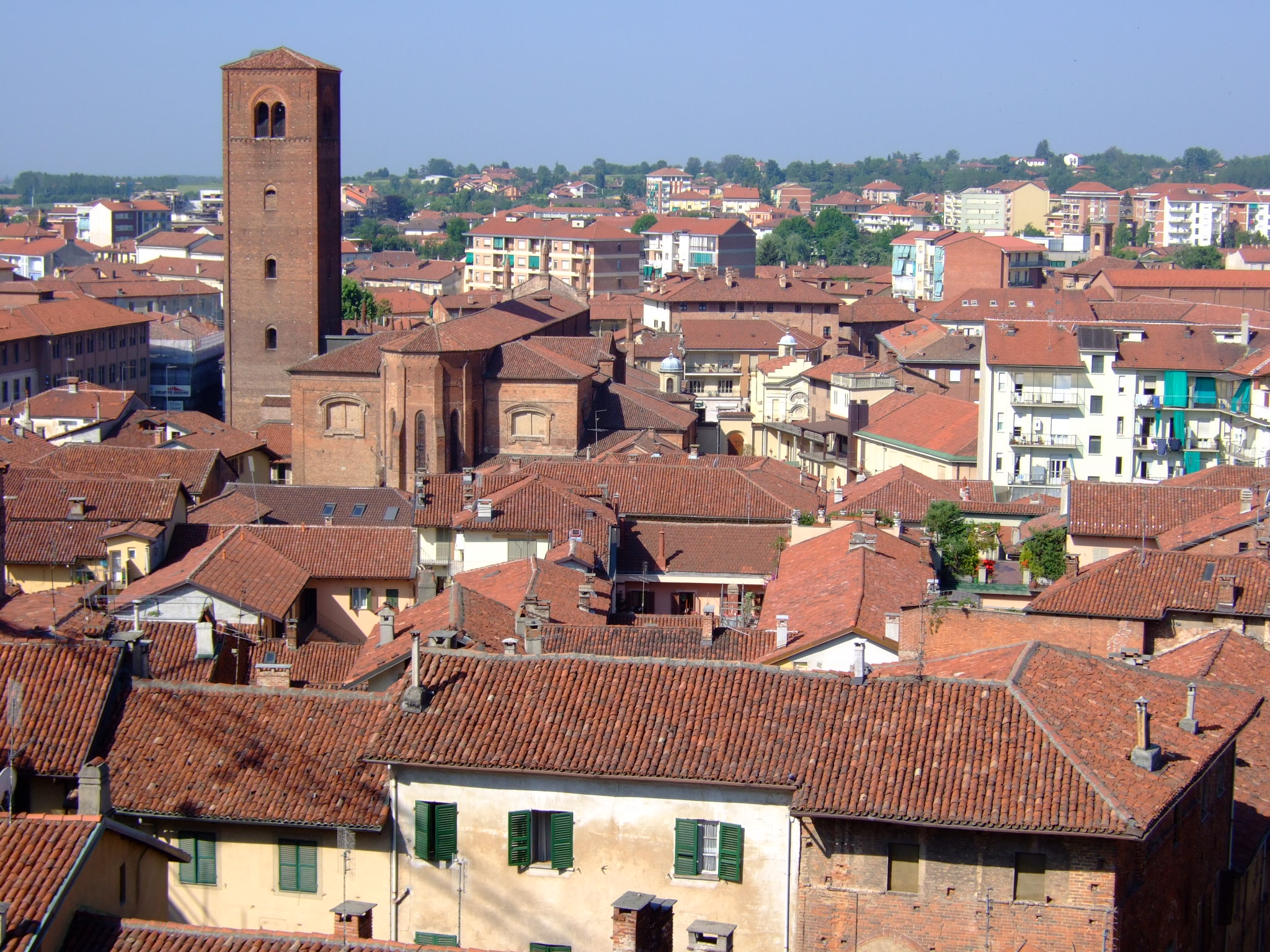
Chieri

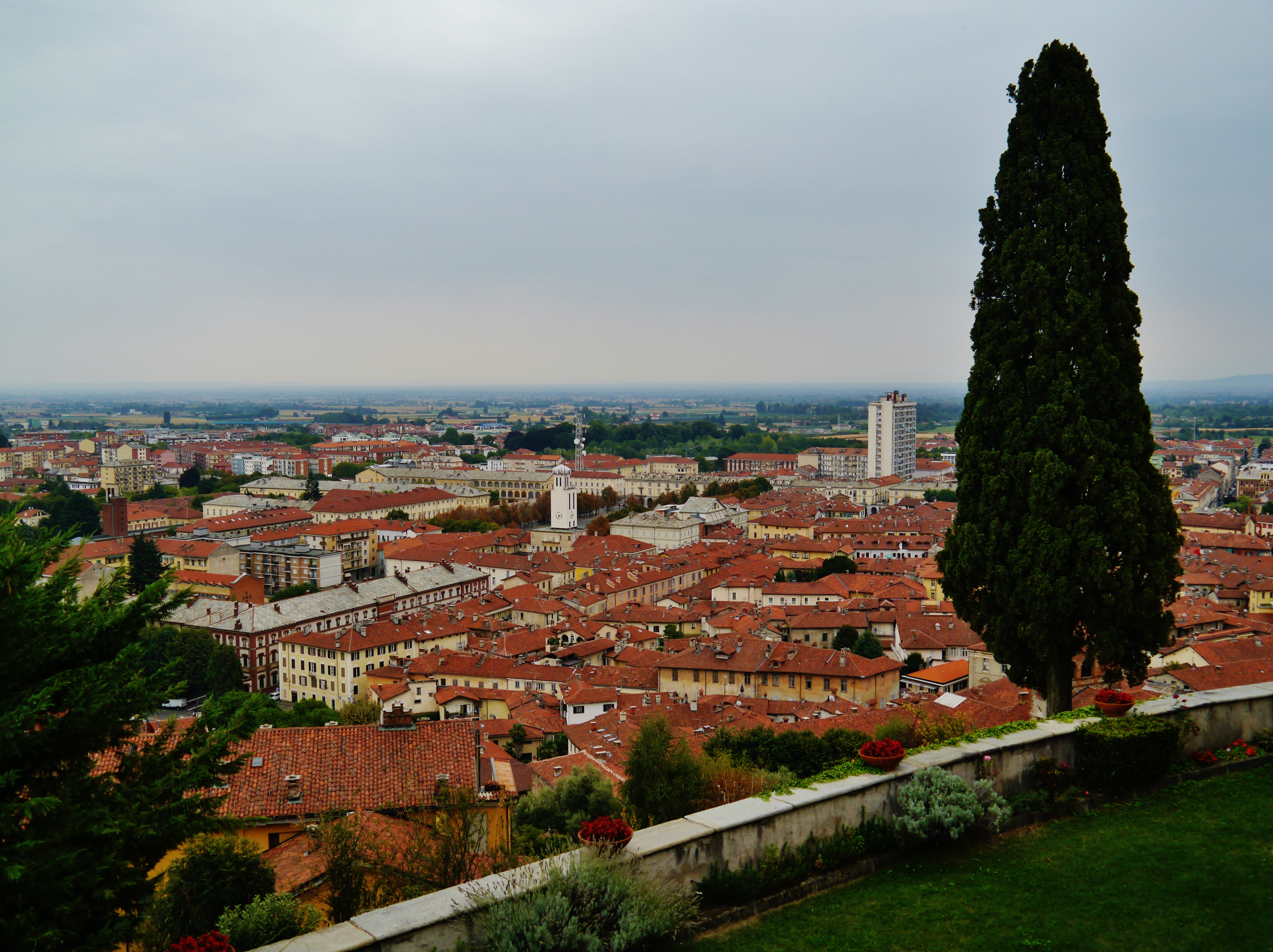
Pinerolo

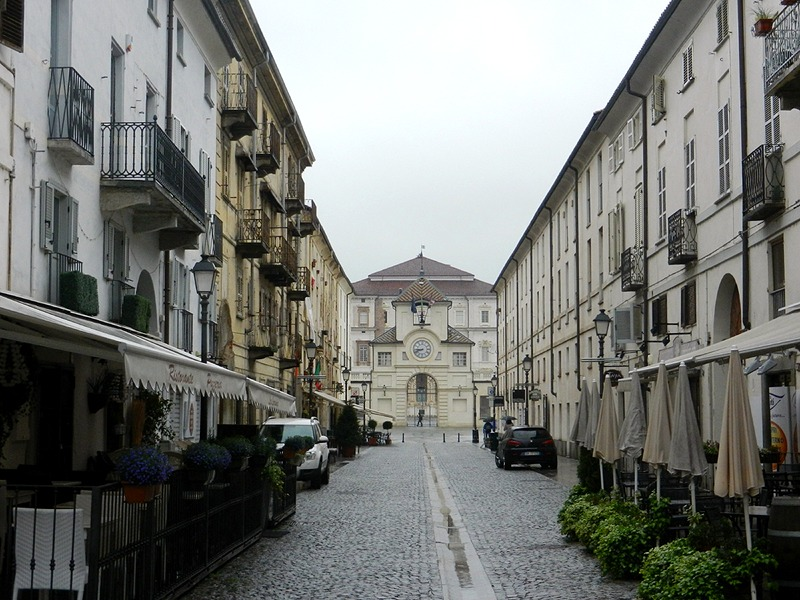
Venaria Reale

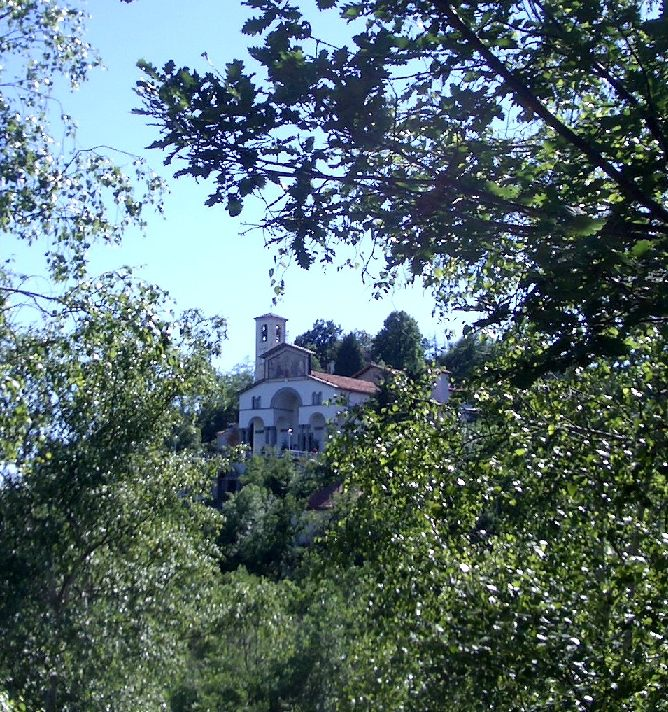
Sacro Monte di Belmonte

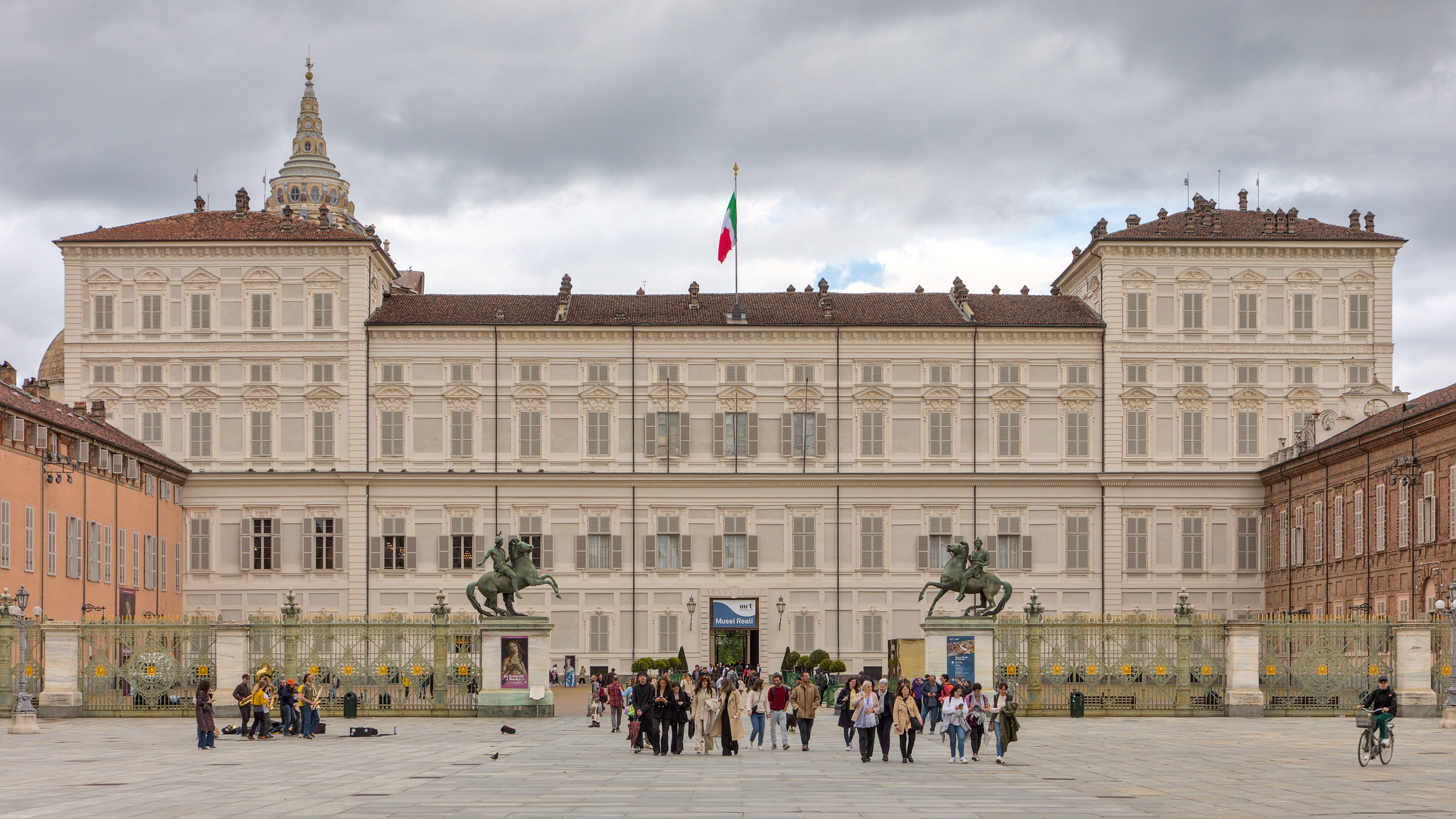
Royal Palace of Turin

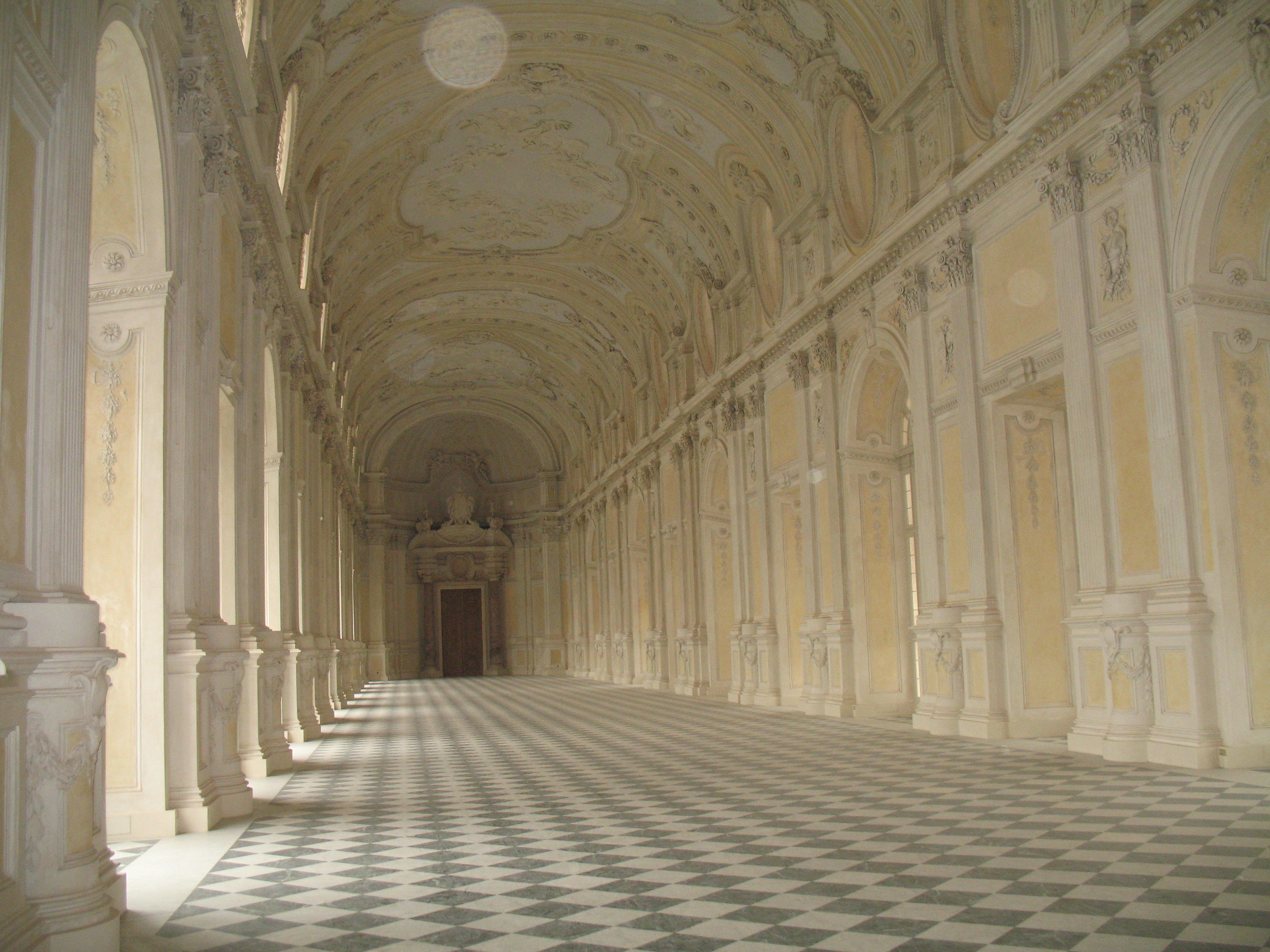
Royal Palace of Turin

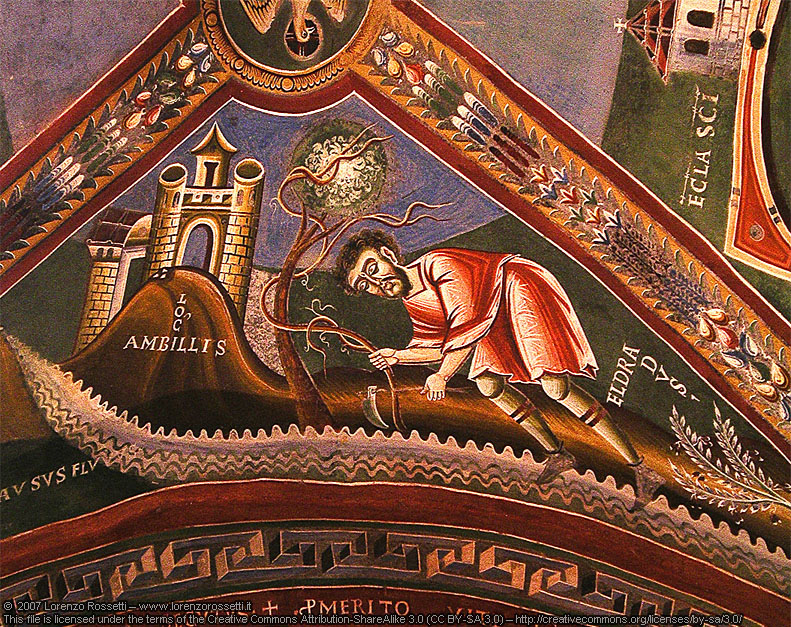
Novalesa Abbey

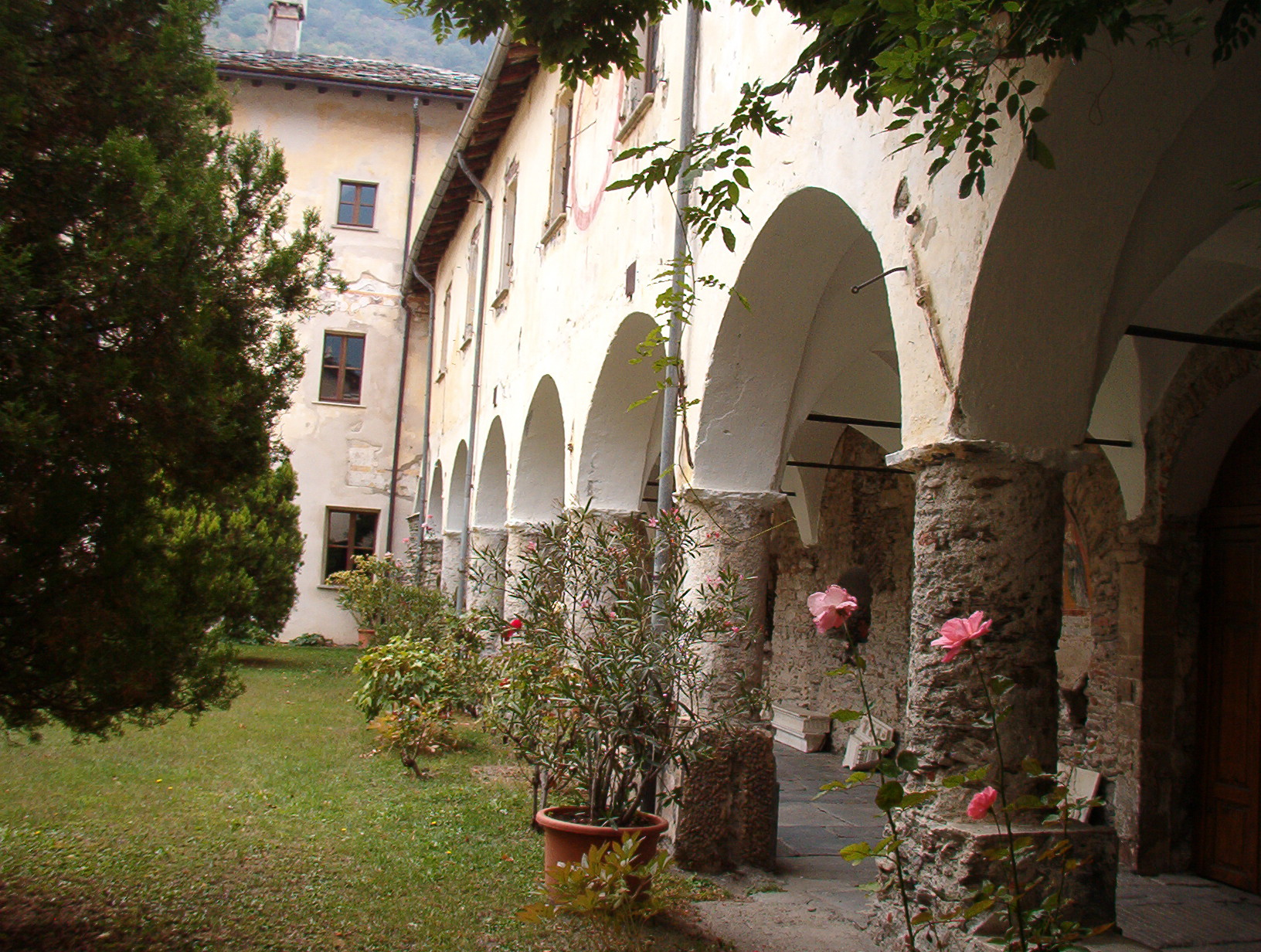
Novalesa Abbey

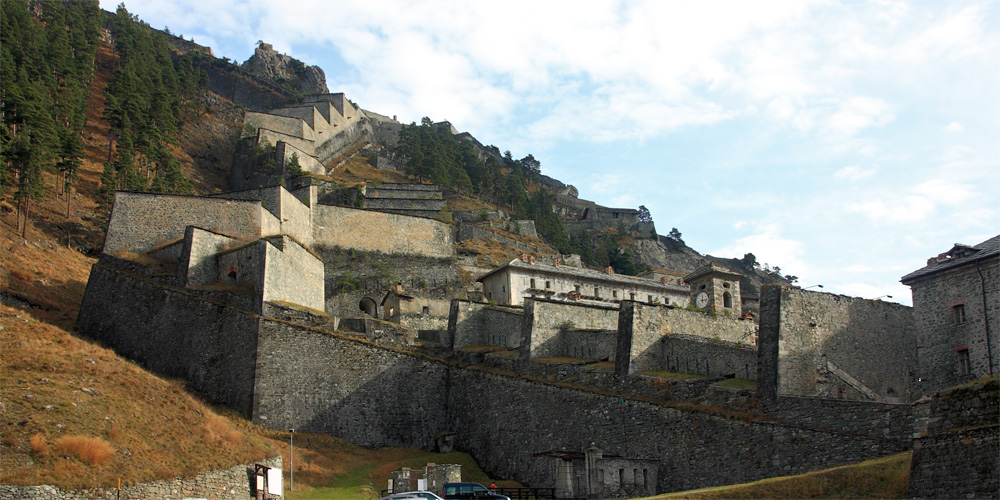
Fenestrelle Fort

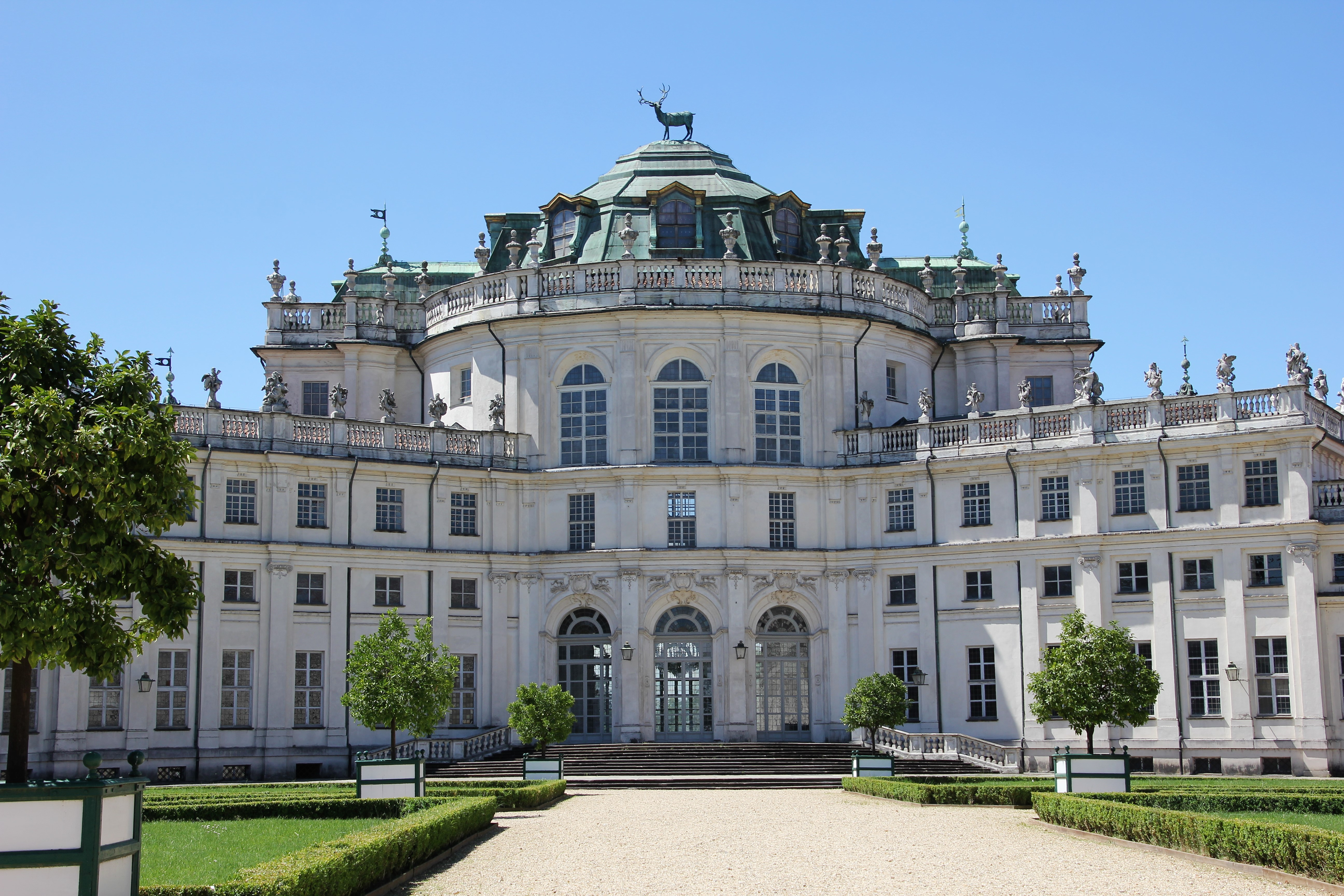
Palazzina di caccia of Stupinigi

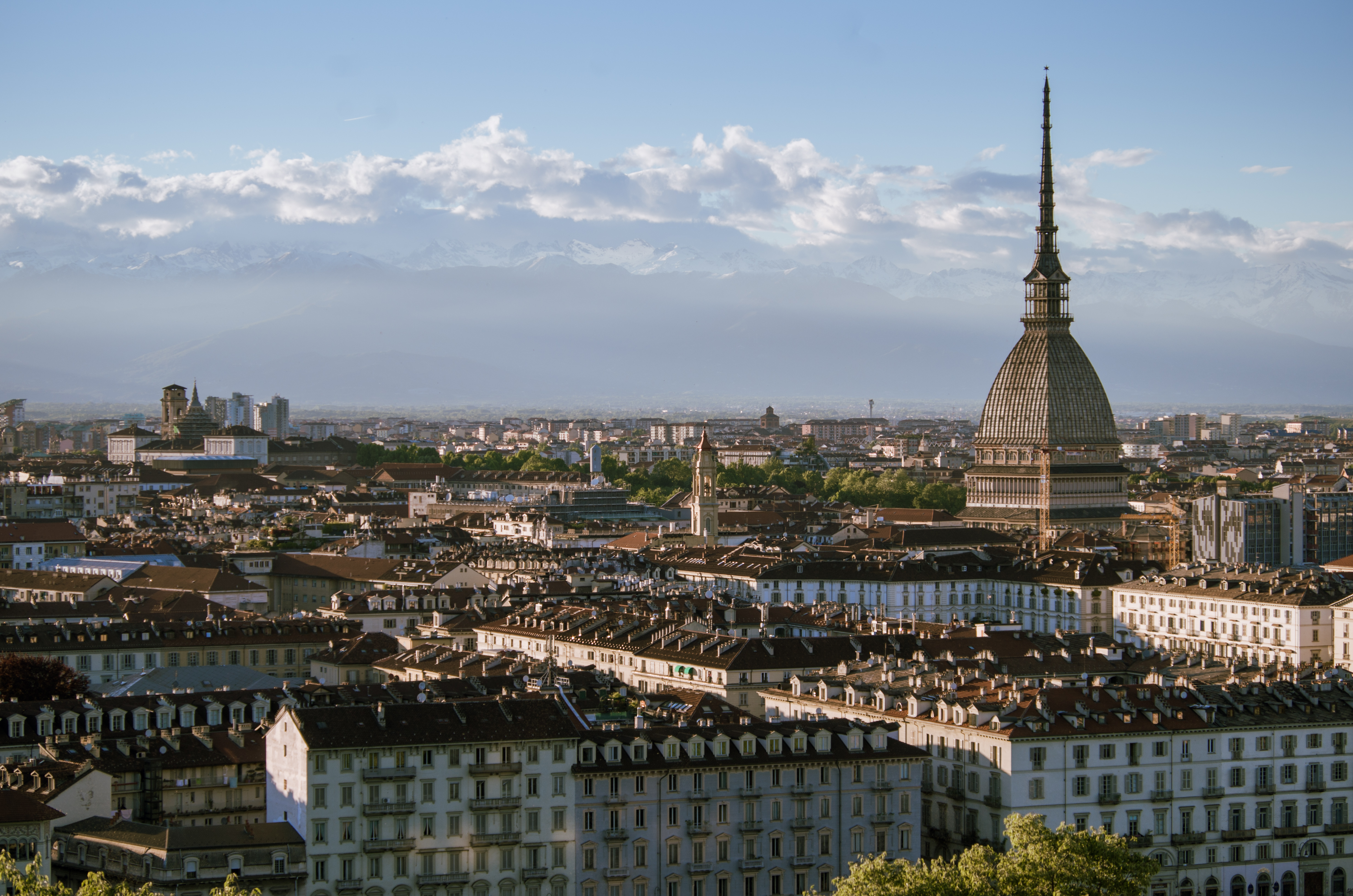
A view of Turin

== Transport ==
The Metropolitan City has a large number of rail and road work sites. Although this activity increased when the city was chosen to host the 2006 Winter Olympics, parts of it had long been planned. Some of the work sites deal with general roadworks to improve traffic flow, such as underpasses and flyovers.

Two projects are of major importance and will radically change the shape of the city of Turin. One is the Spina Centrale ("Central Spine") project, which includes the doubling of a major railway crossing the city, the Turin–Milan railway locally known as Passante Ferroviario di Torino ("Turin Railway Bypass"). The railroad previously ran in a trench. This is to covered by a major boulevard running from North to South of Turin, in a central position along the city. Porta Susa, on this section, will become Turin's main station to substitute the terminus of Porta Nuova with a through station. Other important stations are Stura, Rebaudengo, Lingotto and Madonna di Campagna railway stations, though not all of them belong to the layout of the Spina Centrale.

The other major project is the construction of a subway line based on the VAL system, known as Metrotorino. This project is expected to continue for years and to cover a larger part of the city. Its first phase was finished in time for the 2006 Olympic Games, inaugurated on 4 February 2006 and opened to the public the day after. The first leg of the subway system linked the nearby town of Collegno with Porta Susa in Turin's city centre. On 4 October 2007 the line was extended to Porta Nuova. In March 2011 it reached Lingotto. A new extension of the so-called Linea 1 ("Line 1") is expected in the near future, reaching both Rivoli (up to Cascine Vica hamlet) in the Western belt of Turin and Piazza Bengasi in the Southeast side of the city. In addition, a Linea 2 is in the pipeline, and it is supposed to cross Turin from North to South.

The area has an international airport known as Caselle International Airport Sandro Pertini (TRN), located in Caselle Torinese, about 13 km (8 mi) from the centre of Turin. It is connected to the city by a railway service (from Dora Station) and a bus service (from Porta Nuova and Porta Susa railway stations).

As of 2010 also a bicycle-sharing system, the ToBike, is operational.

The metropolitan area is served by Turin Metropolitan Railway Service.

== See also ==
- Gran Paradiso Massif
- Parco Nazionale del Gran Paradiso
- House of Savoy
- Italian language
- Monte Gimont
- Shroud of Turin
