= Cavour, Piedmont =

Cavour
- Comune
- Comune di Cavour
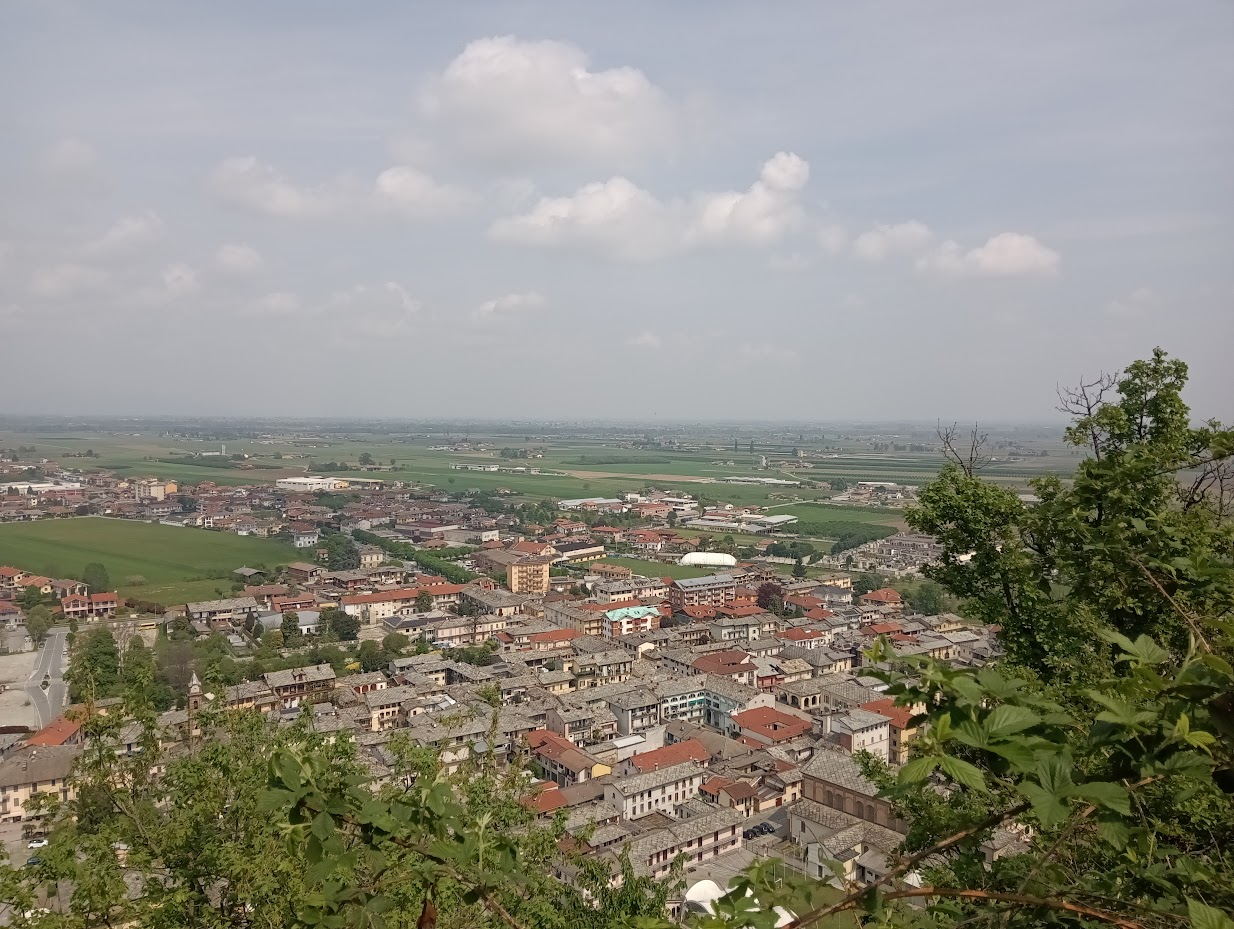
- View of Cavour from the Rocca di Cavour natural park

- Coat of arms

- Location within Italy Location within Piedmont
- Coordinates: 44°47′N 7°23′E
- Country: Italy
- Region: Piedmont
- Metropolitan city: Turin (TO)
- Frazioni: Babano, Cappella del Bosco, Castellani-Vacci, Castellazzo, Cursaglie (or Cappella Nuova), Gemerello, Malano, San Giacomo, San Michele, Sant'Agostino, Sant'Anna, Sant'Antonio, Zucchea

Government
  - Mayor: Sergio Paschetta

Area
  - Total: 48.96 km^{2} (18.90 sq mi)
- Elevation: 300 m (980 ft)

Population (2026)
  - Total: 5,373
  - Density: 109.7/km^{2} (284.2/sq mi)
- Demonym: Cavouresi
- Time zone: UTC+1 (CET)
  - Summer (DST): UTC+2 (CEST)
- Postal code: 10061
- Dialing code: 0121
- Patron saint: St. Lawrence
- Saint day: First Sunday in August
- Website: Official website

Cavour (Italian pronunciation: [kaˈvur]; from the Piedmontese toponym, Cavor [kaˈʋʊr]; Latin: Caburrum) is a town and comune (municipality) in the Metropolitan City of Turin in the region of Piedmont in Italy, located about 40 kilometres (25 mi) southwest of Turin. It has 5,373 inhabitants.

Cavour borders the municipalities of Macello, Vigone, Bricherasio, Garzigliana, Villafranca Piemonte, Campiglione-Fenile, Bibiana, Bagnolo Piemonte, and Barge.

== History ==
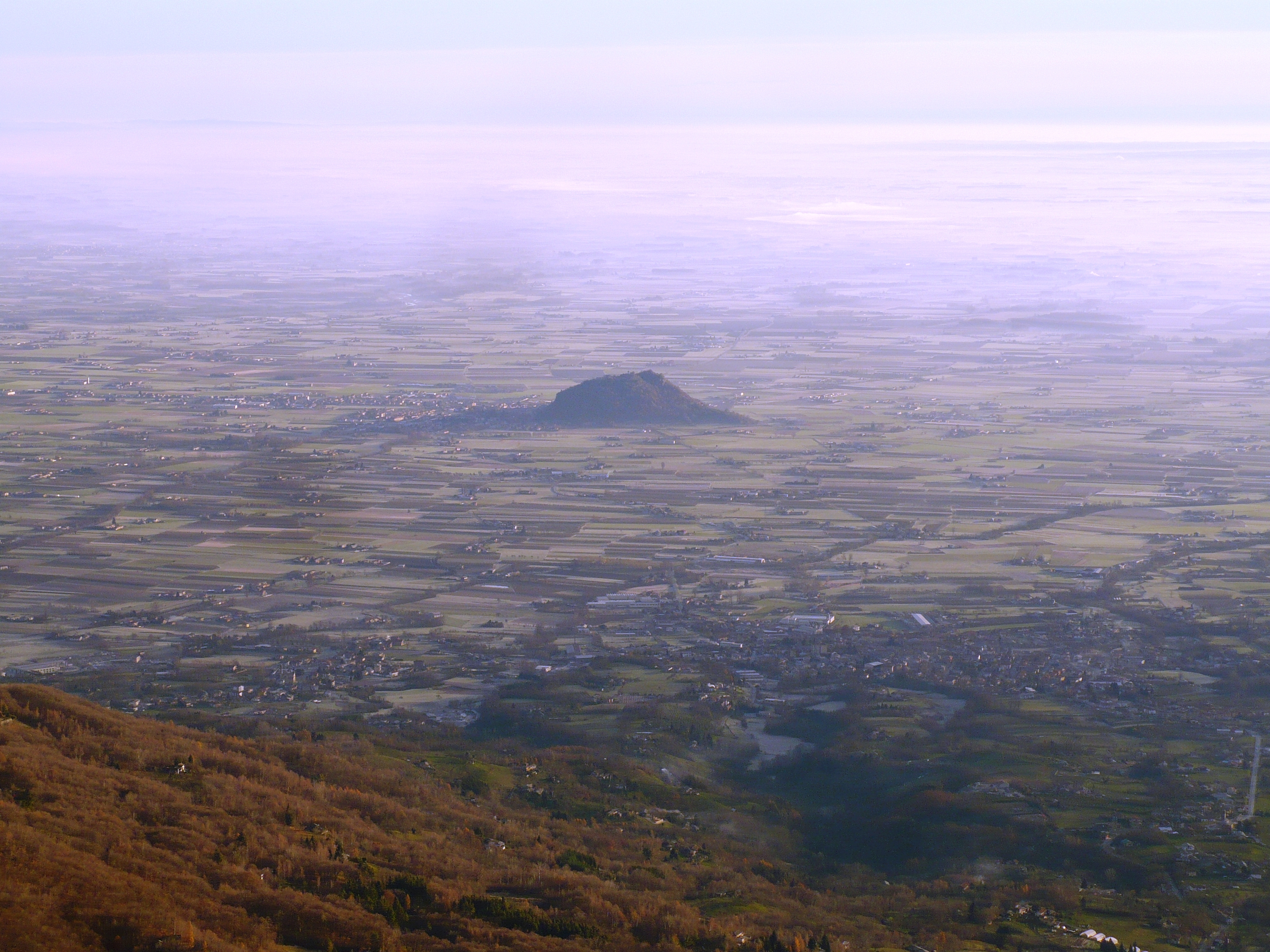
Rocca di Cavour from Rucas

Its ancient Roman name was Caburrum or Forum Vibii. Cavour lies on the north side of a huge isolated mass of granite (the Rocca di Cavour) which rises from the plain. On the summit was the Roman village, which belonged to the province of the Alpes Cottiae. There are some ruins of medieval fortifications.

In 1422 Cavour was captured by Thomas of Savoy and passed into Savoyard hands until in 1433 the castle and its lordship was bestowed by Amadeus VIII to Louis of Achaea, the illegitimate son of Louis of Piedmont and his descendants the lords of Raconis.(Racconigi)

The area around was a stronghold of the Christian movement of the Waldensians who were persecuted for their faith, culminating in Emanuele Filiberto of Savoy engaging the Waldensians in battle; the attack was repelled through guerrilla warfare. The duke was then forced to give the Waldensians a limited right to exercise their religion, recorded in the Treaty of Cavour (1561)

Starting in 1592 and for several years during the French Wars of Religion the town was occupied by François de Bonne, Duke of Lesdiguières and thus controlling the movements in the area.

The town gave its name to the Benso family of Chieri, who were raised to the marquisate in 1771, and of which the statesman Cavour was a member.

== Demographics ==
As of 2026, the population is 5,373, of which 50.0% are male, and 50.0% are female. Minors make up 14.8% of the population, and seniors make up 27.0%.

Historical population

Year	Pop.	±%
1861	7,794	—
1871	7,449	−4.4%
1881	7,202	−3.3%
1901	6,843	−5.0%
1911	6,512	−4.8%
1921	6,317	−3.0%
1931	6,231	−1.4%
1936	6,244	+0.2%

Year	Pop.	±%
1951	5,817	−6.8%
1961	5,199	−10.6%
1971	5,043	−3.0%
1981	5,085	+0.8%
1991	5,226	+2.8%
2001	5,283	+1.1%
2011	5,568	+5.4%
2021	5,374	−3.5%

Source: ISTAT

=== Immigration ===
As of 2025, the foreign-born population is 480, making up 8.9% of the total population. The 5 largest foreign countries of origin are Romania (180), Morocco (74), China (51), Argentina (21) and Albania (19).

== Notable people ==
- Camillo Benso, conte di Cavour
- Mauro Picotto
