= Buriasco =

- Comune
- Comune di Buriasco
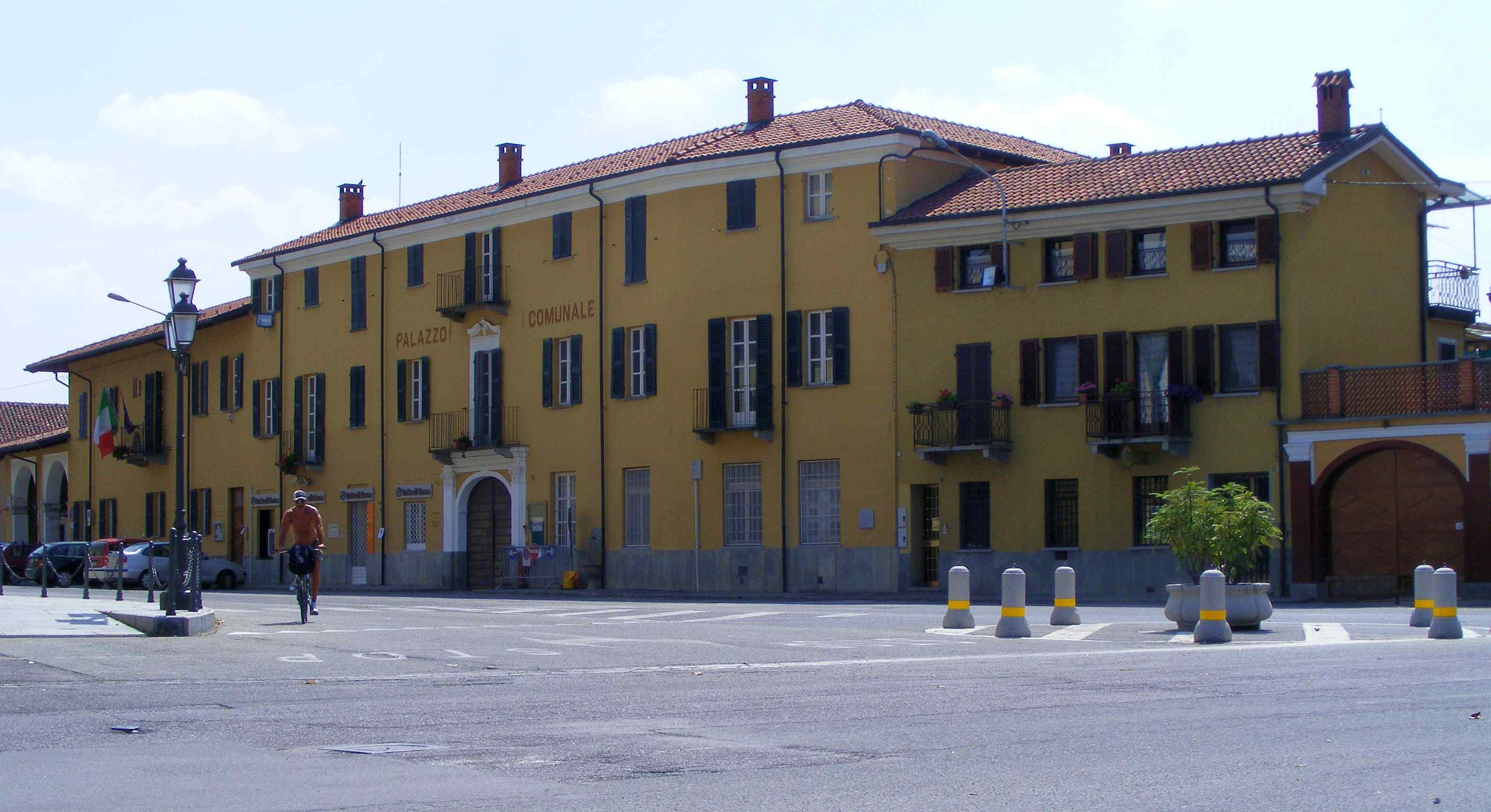
- Town hall.

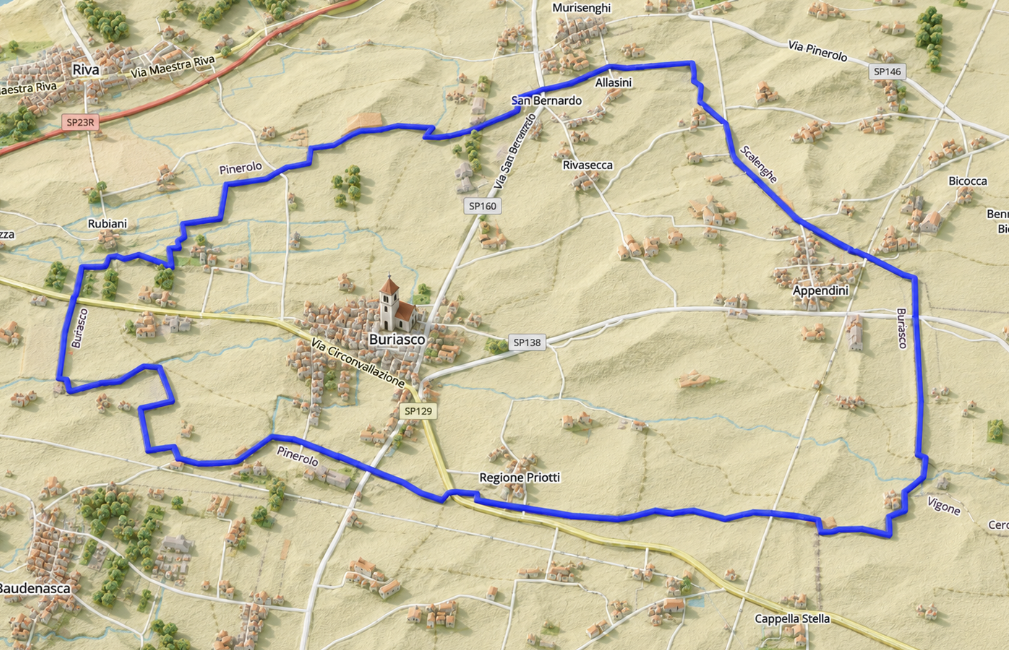

- Location within Italy Location within Piedmont
- Coordinates: 44°52′N 7°25′E
- Country: Italy
- Region: Piedmont
- Metropolitan city: Turin (TO)

Government
  - Mayor: Carlo Manavella

Area
  - Total: 14.69 km^{2} (5.67 sq mi)
- Elevation: 301 m (988 ft)

Population (30 November 2017)
  - Total: 1,471
  - Density: 100.1/km^{2} (259.4/sq mi)
- Demonym: Buriaschesi
- Time zone: UTC+1 (CET)
  - Summer (DST): UTC+2 (CEST)
- Postal code: 10060
- Dialing code: 0121
- Website: Official website

Buriasco is a comune (municipality) in the Metropolitan City of Turin in the Italian region of Piedmont, located about 30 kilometres (19 mi) southwest of Turin.

Buriasco borders the following municipalities: Pinerolo, Scalenghe, Cercenasco, Macello, and Vigone.

== Twin towns and sister cities ==
Buriasco is twinned with:

- María Juana, Argentina
