= Campiglione-Fenile =

Campiglione Fenile
- Comune
- Comune di Campiglione Fenile
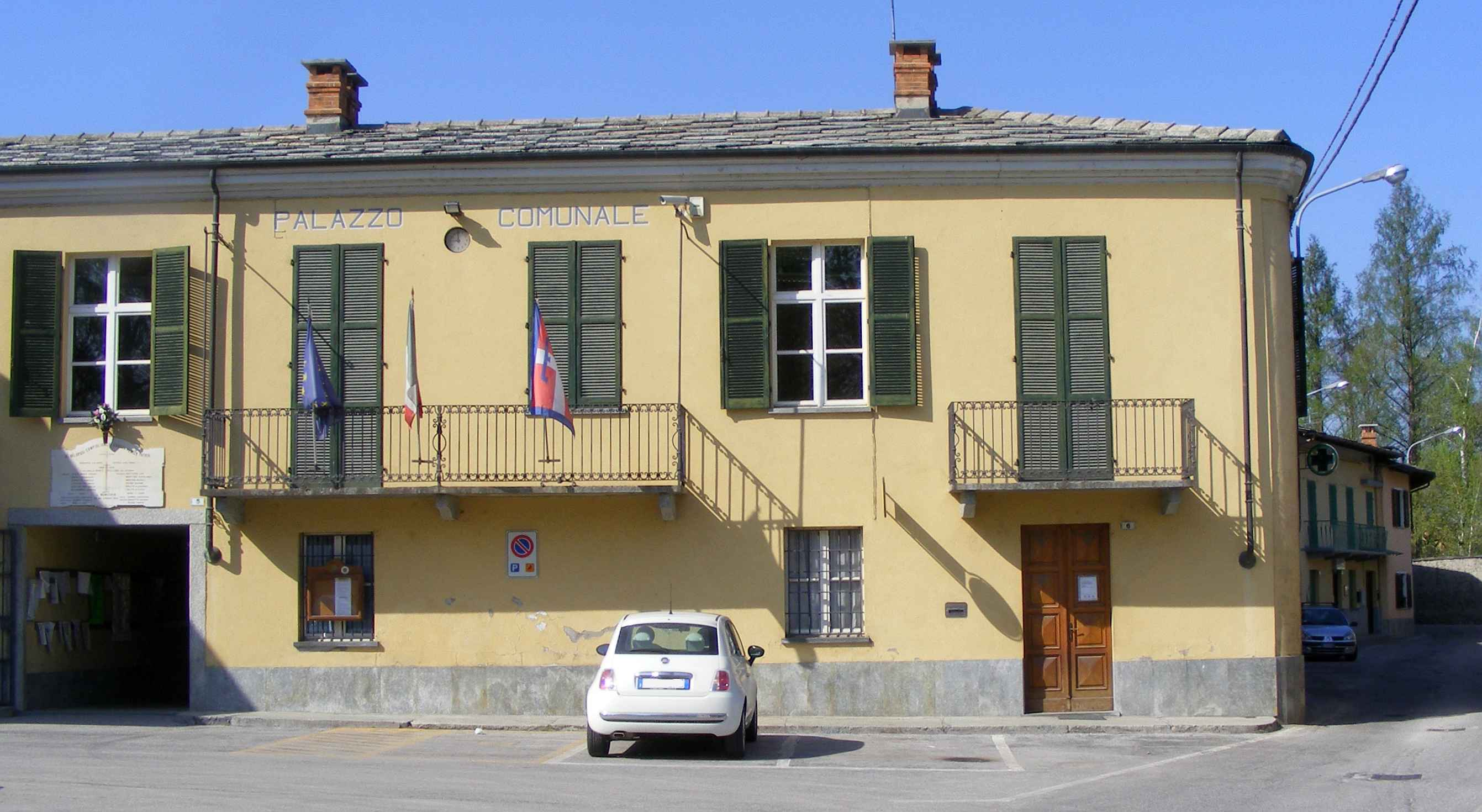
- Town Hall

- Coat of arms

- Location within Italy Location within Piedmont
- Coordinates: 44°48′N 7°20′E
- Country: Italy
- Region: Piedmont
- Metropolitan city: Turin (TO)

Government
  - Mayor: Paolo Rossetto

Area
  - Total: 11.09 km^{2} (4.28 sq mi)
- Elevation: 365 m (1,198 ft)

Population (31 August 2021)
  - Total: 1,343
  - Density: 121.1/km^{2} (313.6/sq mi)
- Demonym(s): Campiglionesi and Fenilesi
- Time zone: UTC+1 (CET)
  - Summer (DST): UTC+2 (CEST)
- Postal code: 10060
- Dialing code: 0121
- Website: Official website

Campiglione Fenile is a comune (municipality) in the Metropolitan City of Turin in the Italian region Piedmont, located about 40 kilometres (25 mi) southwest of Turin.

Campiglione-Fenile borders the following municipalities: Bricherasio, Cavour, and Bibiana. The comune was formed in 1928 by merging the two previous comuni of Campiglione and Fenile.
