= Roc (Gran Paradiso) =

Mountain in the Graian Alps in Italy

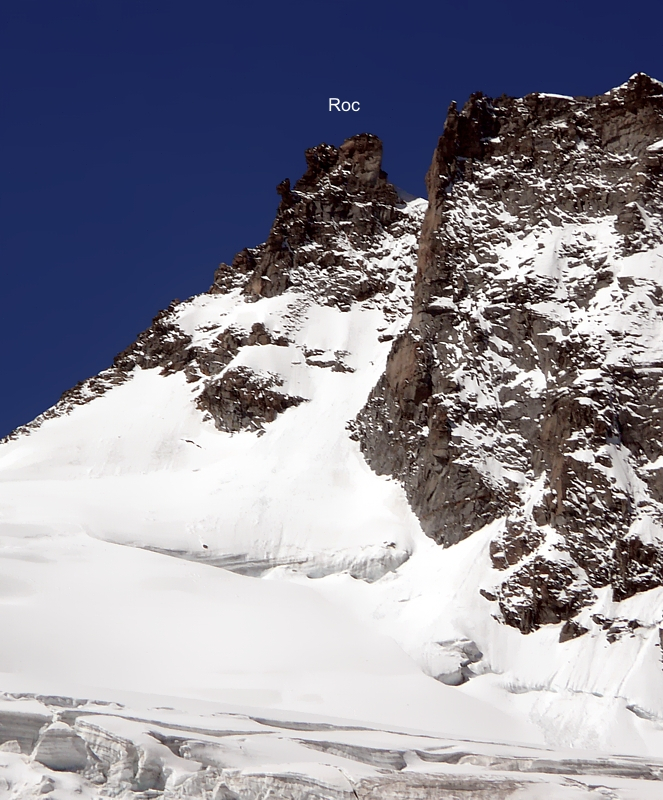
- Roc

Highest point
- Elevation: 4,026 m (13,209 ft)
- Prominence: 29 m (95 ft)
- Isolation: 0.44 km (0.27 mi)
- Coordinates: 45°30′53″N 7°16′11″E

Naming
- English translation: Rock
- Language of name: French

Geography
- Location within Italy
- Location: Piedmont (Metropolitan City of Turin) and Aosta Valley, Italy
- Parent range: Graian Alps

The Roc (IPA [ʁok]) is a mountain of the Gran Paradiso Massif, in the Graian Alps in Italy. It is located between the Aosta Valley and Piedmont regions and is the highest point in the Metropolitan City of Turin.

== Geography ==
The Roc from the ridge in the section between Montcorvé Pass (3,875 m) and the Fenêtre de Montcorvé Pass (3,998 m), the culmination of the Orco - Dora watershed from where the long Valsavarenche-Cogne Valley ridge begins towards the north, including the summit of the Gran Paradiso (4,061 m) and other important peaks of the group, ending with the Grivola (3,969 m)

== See also ==
- List of 4000 metre peaks of the Alps
