= Castagnole Piemonte =

Castagnole Piemonte Castagnòle (Piedmontese) Castagnòle (Arpitan)
- Comune
- Comune di Castagnole Piemonte
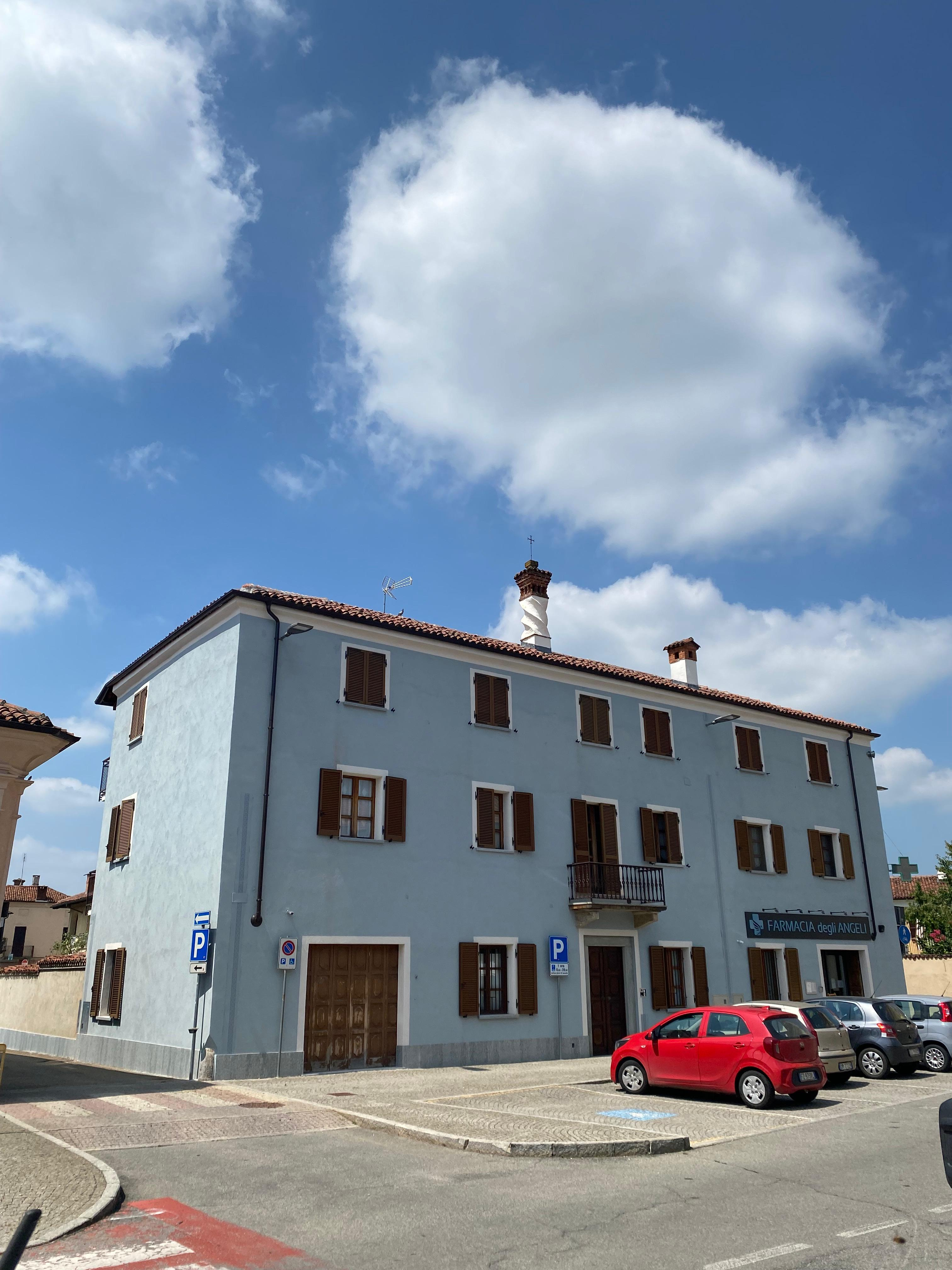

- Coat of arms

- Location within Italy Location within Piedmont
- Coordinates: 44°54′N 7°34′E
- Country: Italy
- Region: Piedmont
- Metropolitan city: Turin (TO)
- Frazioni: Oitana

Government
  - Mayor: Mattia Sandrone

Area
  - Total: 17.28 km^{2} (6.67 sq mi)
- Elevation: 244 m (801 ft)

Population (1 January 2026)
  - Total: 2,168
  - Density: 125.5/km^{2} (324.9/sq mi)
- Demonym: Castagnolesi
- Time zone: UTC+1 (CET)
  - Summer (DST): UTC+2 (CEST)
- Postal code: 10060
- Dialing code: 011
- Patron saint: St. Roch

Castagnole Piemonte (Piedmontese and Arpitan: Castagnòle) is a comune (municipality) in the Metropolitan City of Turin in the Italian region Piedmont, located about 20 kilometres (12 mi) southwest of Turin.
