= Malvasia di Castelnuovo Don Bosco =

DOC dessert wine produced in Asti, Italy

- Wine region
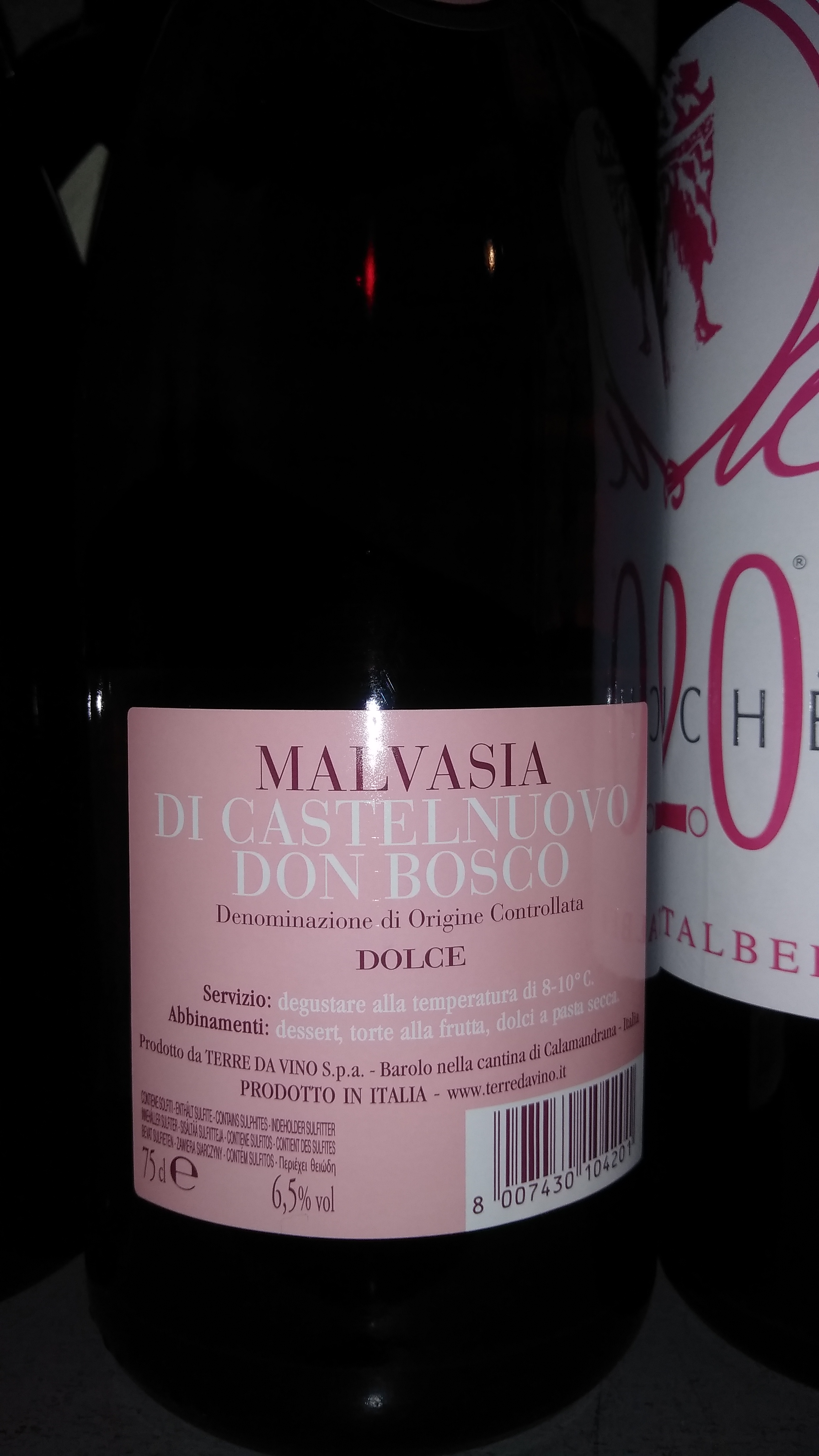
- Type: DOC
- Year established: 1973
- Country: Italy
- Part of: Piemonte
- Size of planted vineyards: 46 hectares (110 acres)
- Varietals produced: Malvasia di Schierano, Freisa
- Wine produced: 2,070 hl

Malvasia di Castelnuovo Don Bosco is a sweet, sparkling, red or rosé DOC dessert wine produced in the Italian province of Asti from the Malvasia di Schierano grape variety with the optional addition of up to 15% Freisa.

The wine is cherry red in colour with an aroma typical of the grape and 'reminiscent of dog roses and scents of red berries.' The flavour is sweet and aromatic with characteristic tannins. It is made in both lightly (frizzante) and fully sparkling (spumante) versions; the regulations also permit it to be made as a still wine.

== Production zone ==
The production regulations require that the grapes are grown on the hills within the borders of the following communes of the Province of Asti: Albugnano, Castelnuovo Don Bosco, Passerano Marmorito, Pino d’Asti, Berzano di San Pietro and Moncucco Torinese. The wine itself is preferably made in the same area, however vinification is allowed elsewhere in the Province of Asti and the wine is currently produced also in wineries in Cocconato and Calosso.

== Production volumes ==
Year	Vines (ha)	Wine (hl)
1997	68	4,241
1998	75	4,749
1999	71	4,101
2000	76	4,225
2001	74	4,616
2002	66	3,495
2003	63	3,100
2004	63	4,084
