= Mombello =

Mombello is the name of a number of places in Italy:

- Mombello di Torino, in the Province of Turin
- Mombello Monferrato, in the Province of Alessandria
- Laveno-Mombello, in the Province of Varese
