= Mombello di Torino =

- Comune
- Comune di Mombello di Torino
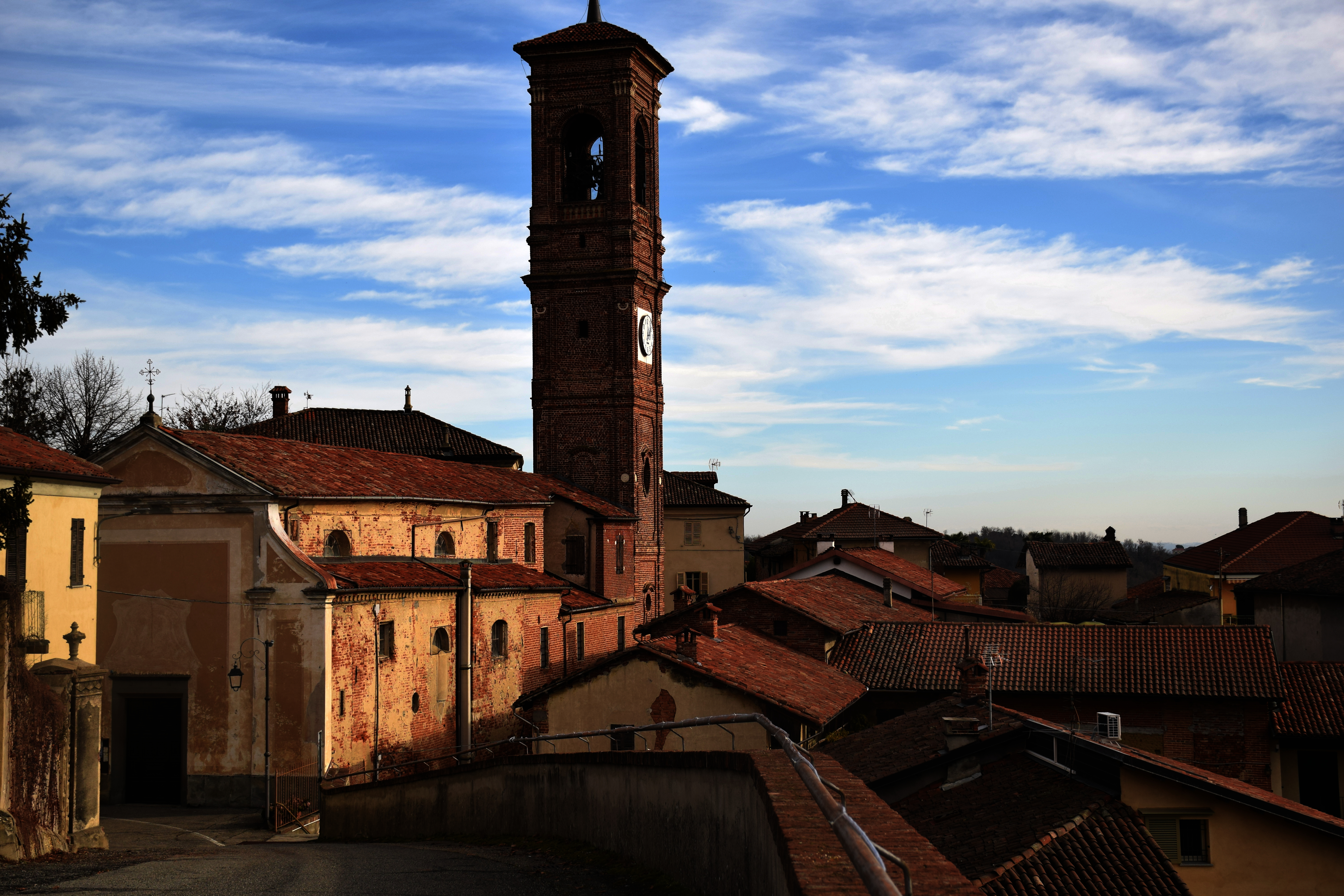

- Coat of arms

- Location within Italy Location within Piedmont
- Coordinates: 45°3′N 7°55′E
- Country: Italy
- Region: Piedmont
- Metropolitan city: Turin (TO)

Government
  - Mayor: Claudio Berruto

Area
  - Total: 4.1 km^{2} (1.6 sq mi)
- Elevation: 336 m (1,102 ft)

Population (31 December 2010)
  - Total: 411
  - Density: 100/km^{2} (260/sq mi)
- Demonym: Mombellesi
- Time zone: UTC+1 (CET)
  - Summer (DST): UTC+2 (CEST)
- Postal code: 10020
- Dialing code: 011
- Patron saint: St. Anne
- Saint day: July 26

Mombello di Torino is a comune (municipality) in the Metropolitan City of Turin in the Italian region Piedmont, located about 15 kilometres (9 mi) east of Turin.

Mombello di Torino borders the following municipalities: Moncucco Torinese, Arignano, Moriondo Torinese, and Riva presso Chieri.
