= Marentino =

- Comune
- Comune di Marentino
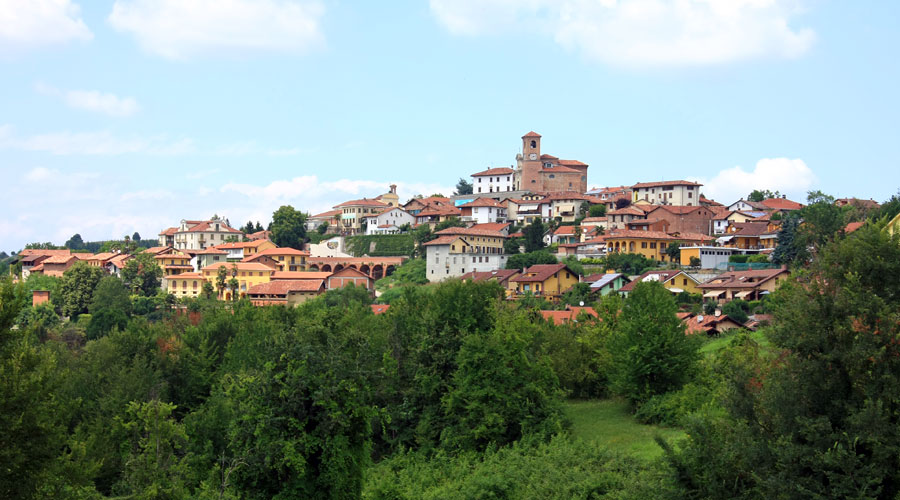

- Coat of arms

- Location within Italy Location within Piedmont
- Coordinates: 45°3′N 7°52′E
- Country: Italy
- Region: Piedmont
- Metropolitan city: Turin (TO)
- Frazioni: Avuglione, Vernone

Government
  - Mayor: Ines Molino

Area
  - Total: 11.3 km^{2} (4.4 sq mi)
- Elevation: 383 m (1,257 ft)

Population (31 December 2010)
  - Total: 1,409
  - Density: 125/km^{2} (323/sq mi)
- Demonym: Marentinesi
- Time zone: UTC+1 (CET)
  - Summer (DST): UTC+2 (CEST)
- Postal code: 10020
- Dialing code: 011

Marentino is a comune (municipality) in the Metropolitan City of Turin in the Italian region Piedmont, located about 13 kilometres (8 mi) east of Turin.

Marentino borders the following municipalities: Sciolze, Moncucco Torinese, Montaldo Torinese, Arignano, and Andezeno.

== See also ==
- Lake Arignano
