= Comolli =

Comolli is a surname. Notable people with the surname include:

- Damien Comolli (born 1971), French football coach, scout and director
- Giovanni Battista Comolli (1775–1831), Italian sculptor
- Jean-Louis Comolli (1941–2022), French writer, editor, and film director
- Jessica Comolli (born 1985), beauty queen from Montpelier, Vermont

== See also ==
- Comollo (surname)
