= Castelnuovo Don Bosco =

- Comune
- Comune di Castelnuovo Don Bosco
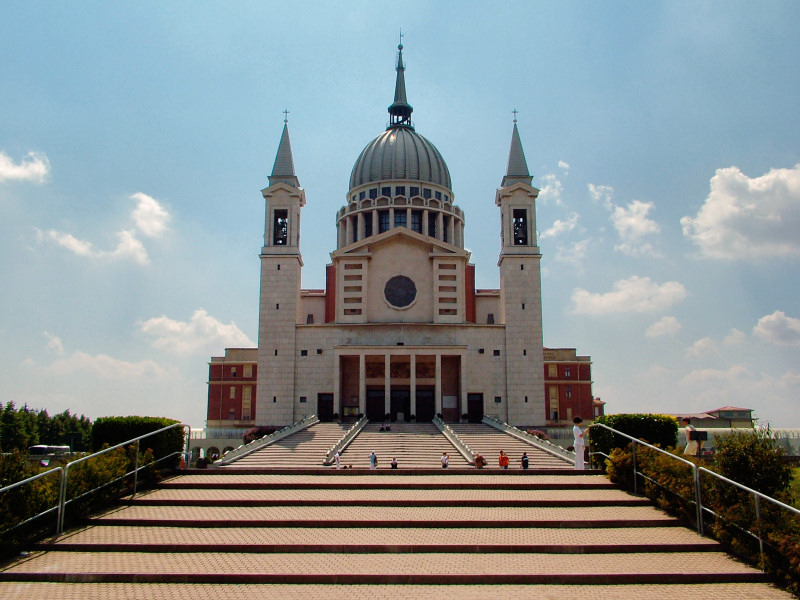
- Basilica of Don Bosco

- Coat of arms

- Location within Italy Location within Piedmont
- Coordinates: 45°2′N 7°58′E
- Country: Italy
- Region: Piedmont
- Province: Asti (AT)
- Frazioni: Mondonio San Domenico Savio, Bardella, Nevissano, Ranello, Morialdo

Government
  - Mayor: Antonio Rago

Area
  - Total: 22.0 km^{2} (8.5 sq mi)
- Elevation: 306 m (1,004 ft)

Population (31 May 2007)
  - Total: 3,187
  - Density: 145/km^{2} (375/sq mi)
- Demonym: Castelnovesi
- Time zone: UTC+1 (CET)
  - Summer (DST): UTC+2 (CEST)
- Postal code: 14022
- Dialing code: 011
- Patron saint: St. Roch
- Saint day: August 16
- Website: Official website

Castelnuovo Don Bosco, formerly Castelnuovo d'Asti (Piedmontese: Castelneuv d'Ast) is a comune (municipality) in the province of Asti in the Italian region Piedmont, located about 20 kilometres (12 miles) east of Turin and about 25 kilometres (16 miles) northwest of Asti, on a hill near the confluence of the Nevissano and Bardella.

Castelnuovo Don Bosco borders the following municipalities: Albugnano, Buttigliera d'Asti, Capriglio, Moncucco Torinese, Moriondo Torinese, Passerano Marmorito, and Pino d'Asti.

== History ==
Castenlnuovo's origins, as attested by the name (meaning "New Castle") are connected to a castle built before 1000 AD, around which a burgh grew as time passed. It was once divided in two by the lords of Riva and the counts of Biandrate, until it was given by the German emperors to the marquesses of Montferrat. Subsequently, it was under the commune of Asti, then a fief of the lords of Rivalba and of those of Piea, until it returned to Montferrat. Later it was acquired by the house of Savoy. It was a fief of the Simiana until the late 18th century.

It was named Castelnuovo d'Asti, prior to being renamed in honor of John Bosco. The renaming took place in 1929, after John Bosco's beatification.

== Main sights ==
- Medieval tower, one of the few remains of the castle once overlooking the burgh. In the nearby is a Baroque sanctuary of the Madonna.
- Parrocchiale of Sant'Andrea.
- Villa Filipello, in Liberty style.
- Palazzo dei Rivalba.
- Basilica of Don Bosco, in the saint's native quarter.
- Romanesque church of Sant'Eusebio, on the road leading to Berzano San Pietro.
- Also in Romanesque style is Santa Maria di Rasetto, in the locality of Garesio outside the town.

In the frazione of Mondonio are the notable Castello di Rivalba, with a large square tower, and a Baroque parish church.

== Notable Castelnovesi ==
- Giuseppe Cafasso (1811–1860), saint, was born here.
- Don Bosco (1815–1888), saint, was born in the frazione (hamlet) of Becchi.
- Domenico Savio (1842–1857), saint, moved here from his birthplace, Chieri, at the age of about 12 months.
