= Andezeno =

- Comune
- Comune di Andezeno
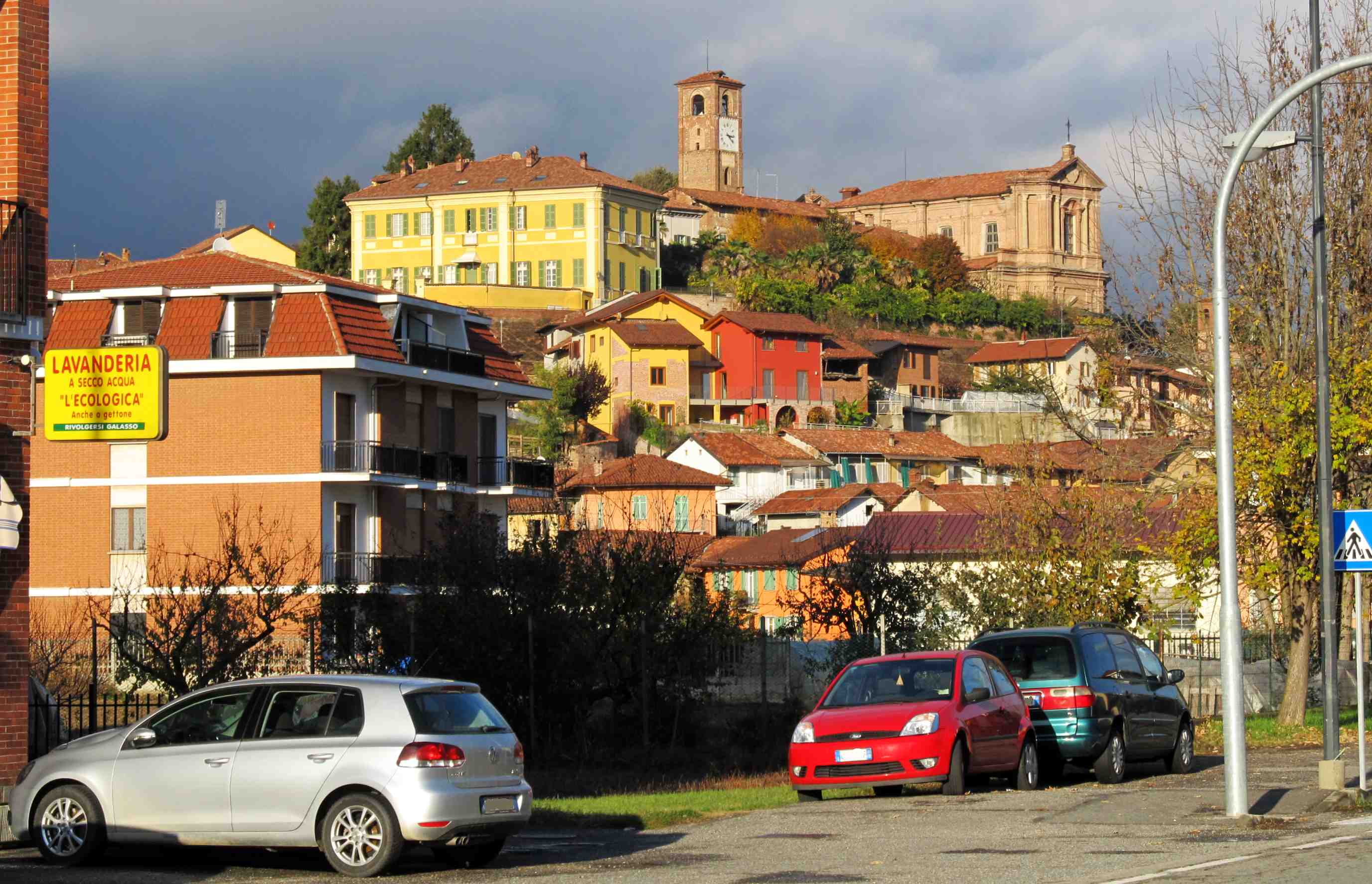

- Coat of arms

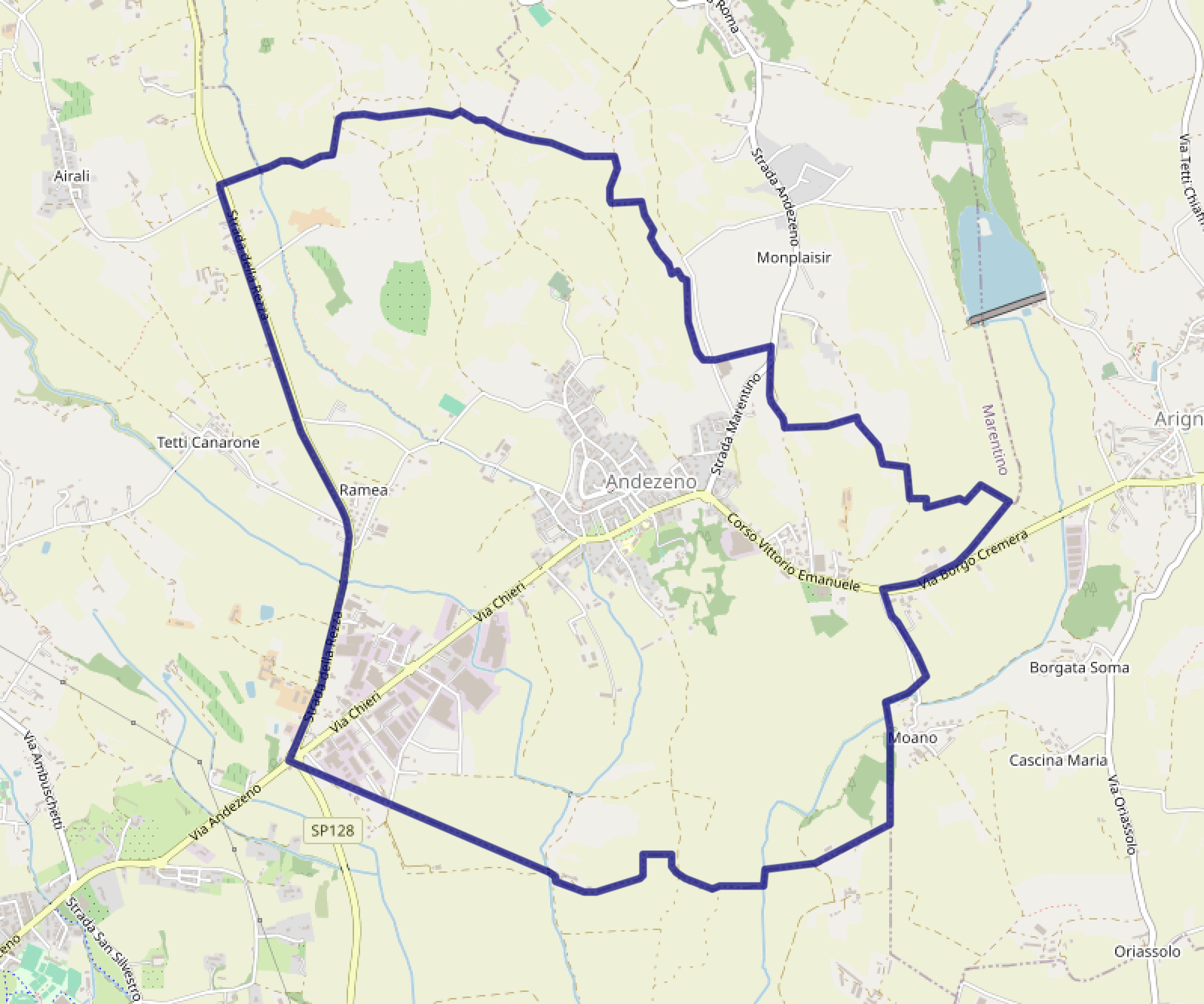

- Location of Andezeno in Italy Andezeno (Piedmont)
- Coordinates: 45°2′N 7°52′E
- Country: Italy
- Region: Piedmont
- Metropolitan city: Turin (TO)

Government
  - Mayor: Franco Gai

Area
  - Total: 7.49 km^{2} (2.89 sq mi)
- Elevation: 306 m (1,004 ft)

Population (1 January 2017)
  - Total: 2,006
  - Density: 268/km^{2} (694/sq mi)
- Demonym: Andezenese(i)
- Time zone: UTC+1 (CET)
  - Summer (DST): UTC+2 (CEST)
- Postal code: 10020
- Dialing code: 011
- Patron saint: Saint George; Italian: San Giorgio
- Saint day: 23 April (Saint George's Day)
- Website: www.comune.andezeno.to.it

Andezeno (Piedmontese: Andzen) is a comune (municipality) in the Metropolitan City of Turin in the Italian region Piedmont, located about 14 kilometres (9 mi) southeast of Turin.

Andezeno borders the following municipalities: Marentino, Montaldo Torinese, Chieri, and Arignano.

== Etymology ==
According to Italian philologist and linguist Dante Olivieri, the name Andezeno originates from the Gallo-Latin word Andicus, which is said to be derived from the names of two villages, Andico and Andicello.

== Economy ==
Andezeno was predominantly an agricultural community until the 1960s when the area surrounding the city of Turin underwent major industrialisation. Today, it mostly home to small businesses and enterprises.

== Notable natives ==
- Piero Gobetti (1901–1926), intellectual and journalist – parents were from Andezeno and he lived there at his family home are various times of his life
- Claudio Marchisio (b. 1986), footballer for Juventus and the Italian national team – born in the city of Turin and raised in Andezeno, where his parents still live.
