= Lake Arignano =

Artificial lake in Piedmont, Italy

Lago di Arignano
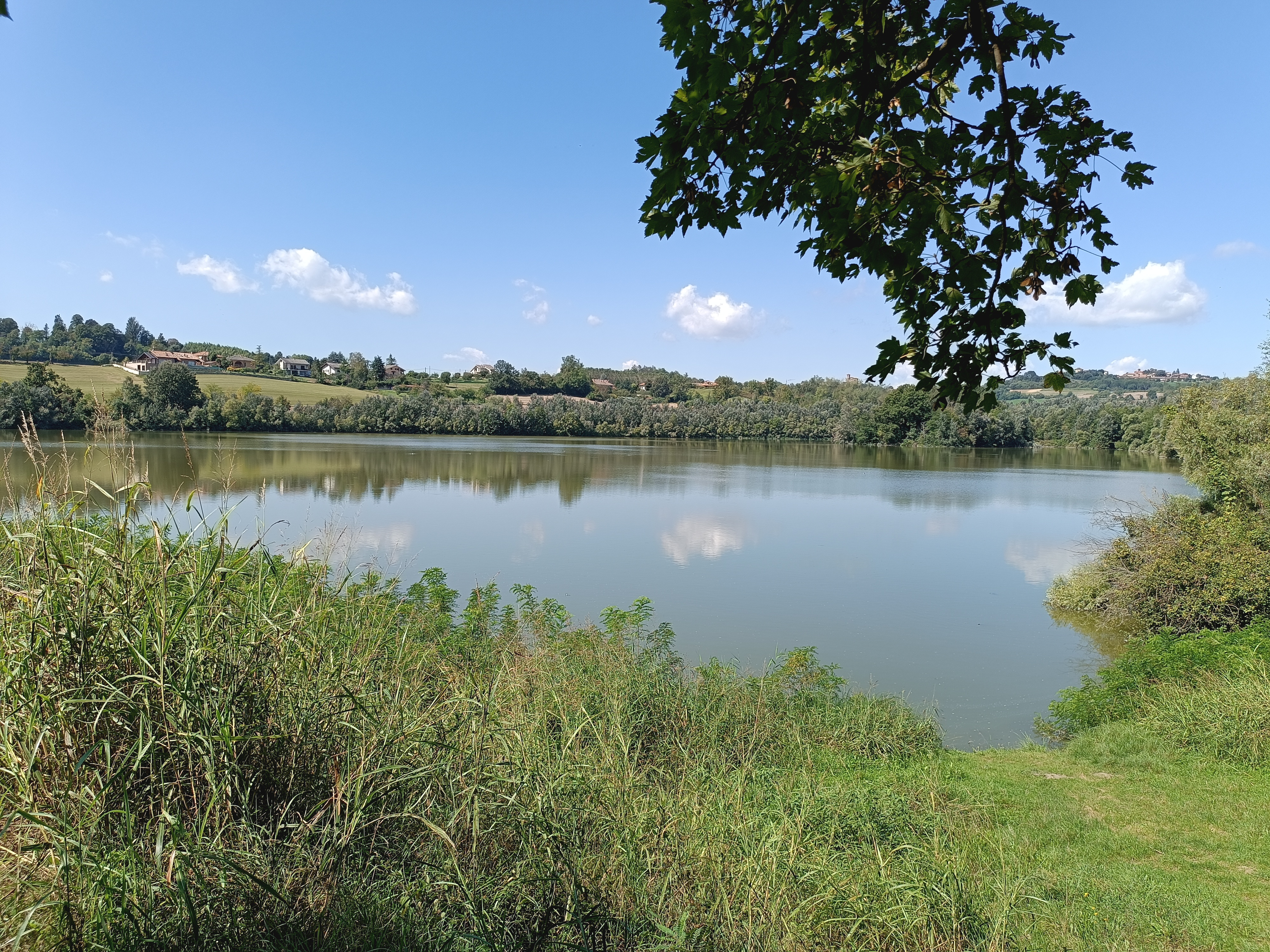
- Interactive map of Lago di Arignano
- Location: Arignano and Marentino, Metropolitan City of Turin, Piedmont, Italy
- Coordinates: 45°02′45.6″N 7°53′20.4″E
- Type: Artificial lake
- Primary inflows: Rio del Lago
- Primary outflows: Rivo del Molino
- Islands: 1

Lago di Arignano is a lake located in the eponymous municipality of the Metropolitan City of Turin.

Count Paolo Remigio Costa della Trinità created this large irrigation basin, which is also the largest body of water in the entire Torinese Hill in 1838. Located in the Cremera region, on the borders of the municipalities of Marentino (where most of the lake lies) and Arignano.

== Description ==
The site, originally a vast depression covered with grass, was favourable due to the slightly concave terrain and required only a dam downstream. The construction of the reservoir was opposed by some landowners, who were expropriated of their lands and contested the public utility value, expressing doubts that the body of water would make the air unhealthy. However, Count Costa's determination allowed all obstacles to be overcome, until on 5 February 1839 Charles Albert granted the "royal patents" authorising the works, which proceeded very quickly. The promoter of the work, however, barely had time to see his project realised before he died on 5 December 1839.

With the fill material, an islet was created in the centre of the lake, which, covered with vegetation, became a place for recreation and boat mooring. Currently, the use of watercraft is prohibited, so the island is not accessible.

The only inflow into the lake is the Rio del Lago, which comes from the north, is never completely dry (although it needs the contribution of rain to fill the reservoir) and collects the waters of the Valle di Lana and Valle Lucco (modest "gullies" set in the hills of Chierese between Marentino and Sciolze). On the sides of the earth dam, in the territory of Marentino (that is, to the southwest), there is a spillway channel lined with concrete: this work of hydraulic engineering is indeed used to discharge downstream the water coming from the catchment basin and to prevent, following a period of rain, the water level in the lake from rising to "overtop" the earth dam. Such an event would certainly cause the earth to dissolve in the water, thus causing a large flood wave that would crash downstream since the dam has reached breaking point. The spillway channel, i.e., the flood discharge, continues its development until it joins the narrow outflow of the lake, which is called Rivo del Molino.

When the dam was built, Lago di Arignano had an area of 0.3 km^{2} (0.12 sq mi) (380 m (1,250 ft) wide at the height of the dam and 900 m (3,000 ft) long in the north-south direction), about half of Little Lake of Avigliana. Today, this maximum surface area, directly proportional to the volume of water stored, is reached only during periods of intense or prolonged rain, typically in the spring/autumn season; in the drier seasons (summer and winter), therefore, the lake is more "restricted".

The benefits of the work were quick to show, allowing to face long periods of summer drought and to rationalise the irrigation distribution in the countryside of Chieri and surroundings, as well as to feed two mills: that of the Lake (which remained operational until the 1960s) and the Moano mill (built in 1860), still existing, but not functioning. They also allowed the fishing of the profitable tench by the tenants who in return committed themselves to the maintenance of the work, and the production of ice, traditionally taken before Christmas and then stored in the ice houses of the Counts of Trinità.

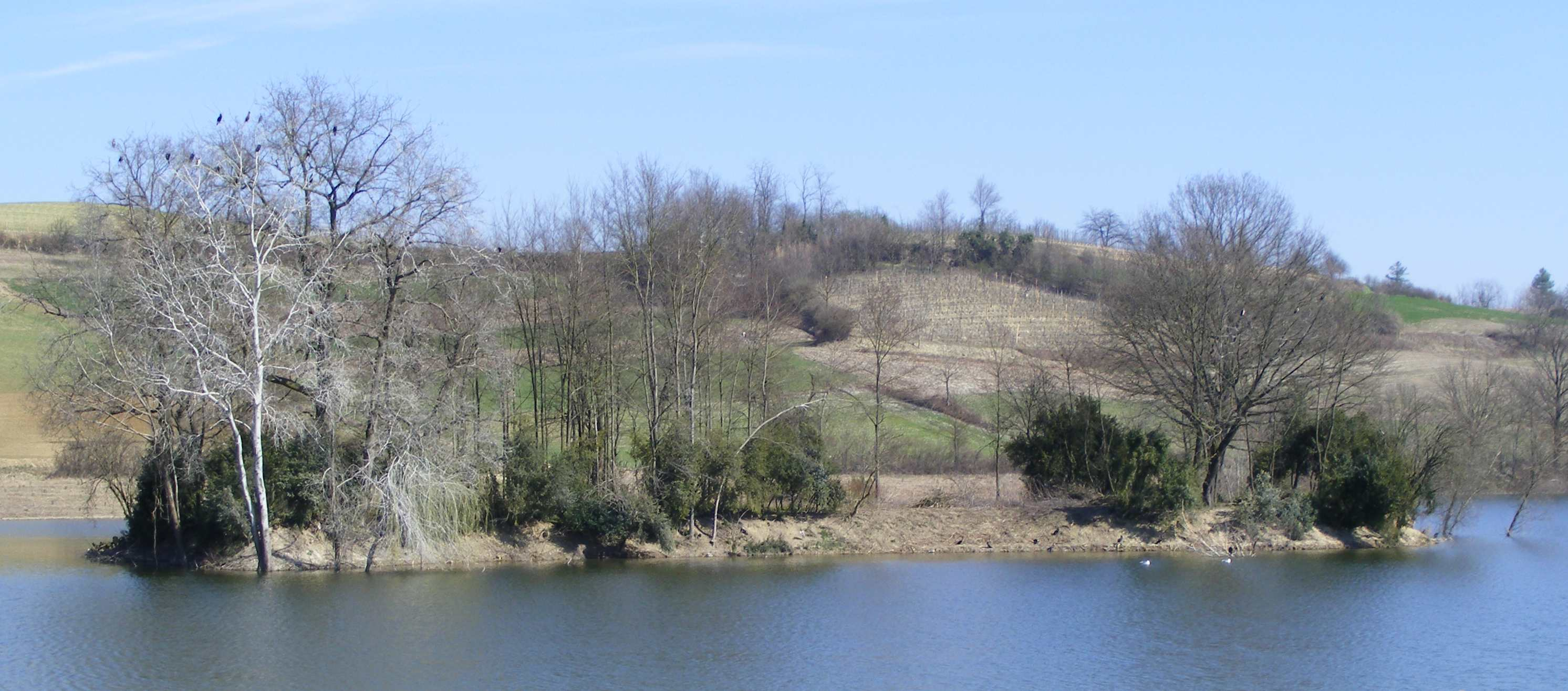
The islet in the center of the lake. Some of the trees present date back to the year of construction of the reservoir (1839)

The slow decline of the reservoir began around 1900, when the Costas sold the lake property to the Counts Rossi of Montelera. The new owners reduced maintenance work, leading to inevitable marshiness. In the 1970s, reclamation works were carried out, but the poor condition of the winches for water drainage and the gates, and the fear of dam instability in case of exceptional meteorological events, led the prefecture of Turin, on 15 March 1980, to order the opening of the gates and the emptying of the lake.

After several years in which the reservoir land was partly cultivated with maize, works began to secure the dam, which led in 2005 to refill the lake; this represents today again an important wetland appreciated by local and migratory birds (geese, mallards, grebes, cormorants, tufted ducks, buzzards, egrets)

== Today ==
The current function of Lago di Arignano is not touristic in the conventional sense, since it is not accessible by paved road, there are no bars/kiosks, and bathing is prohibited; nor does it constitute a fishing reserve, since no restocking has been done yet (there are only birds). There is a type of naturalistic/hiking use, as it is reachable on foot and by bicycle via marked trails. Since the reservoir is currently studied to be a naturalistic oasis, as well as, if necessary, a flood control basin for floods that may affect the Banna stream located further downstream, any water withdrawal for irrigation purposes is prohibited. The committee dedicated to the safeguarding of Lago di Arignano has also promoted a request to the Region of Piedmont to recognize its territorial and naturalistic protection.

The middle path of the Way of Don Bosco passes through Lago di Arignano.
