= Moriondo =

Moriondo may refer to:

- Moriondo Torinese, comune in the Metropolitan City of Turin in the Italian region Piedmont
- Angelo Moriondo, inventor usually credited for patenting the earliest known espresso machine
- Chloe Moriondo, American singer-songwriter and YouTuber born
