= Dominic Savio =

Italian student and Catholic saint (1842–1857)

Saint Dominic Savio
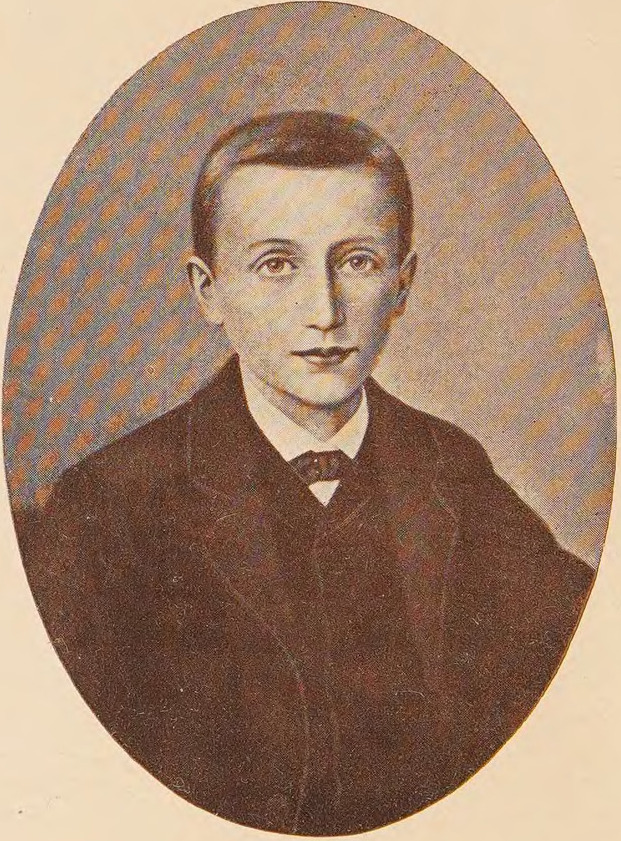

Confessor of the Faith
- Born: 2 April 1842; San Giovanni, a frazione of Riva presso Chieri, Piedmont, Sardinia-Piedmont
- Died: 9 March 1857 (aged 14); Mondonio, a frazione of Castelnuovo d’Asti, Piedmont, Kingdom of Sardinia (today Castelnuovo Don Bosco, Italy)
- Cause of death: Inflammation
- Venerated in: Catholic Church
- Beatified: 5 March 1950, Rome by Pope Pius XII
- Canonized: 12 June 1954, Rome by Pope Pius XII
- Major shrine: The Basilica of Mary Help of Christians in Turin (his tomb)
- Feast: 6 May (formerly 9 March)
- Patronage: Choirboys, falsely accused people, juvenile delinquent and Altar Servers

Dominic Savio (Italian: Domenico Savio; 2 April 1842 – 9 March 1857) was a 19th-century Italian teenager who was a student of John Bosco and became a Catholic saint. He was studying to be a priest when he became ill and died at the age of 14, possibly from pleurisy. He was noted for his piety and devotion to the Catholic faith, and was canonized a saint by Pope Pius XII in 1954.

Bosco regarded Savio very highly, and wrote a biography of his young student, The Life of Dominic Savio. This volume, along with other accounts of him, were critical factors in his cause for sainthood. Despite the fact that many people considered him to have died too young to be considered for sainthood, he was considered eligible for such a singular honour on the basis of displaying "heroic virtue" in his everyday life. Savio was canonised a saint on 12 June 1954 by Pope Pius XII, making him the youngest non-martyr to be canonised in the Catholic Church, until the canonisations of Francisco and Jacinta Marto, the visionaries of Fatima (aged 10 and 9 respectively), in 2017.

== Biography ==
Much of the biographical information known about Savio comes from his biography written by John Bosco, in addition to the testimonies given by Savio's family and friends.

=== Early life ===
The son of Carlo and Brigitta Savio, Dominic was born on 2 April 1842 in the village of Riva, 2 miles (3 km) from the town of Chieri, in Piedmont, northern Italy. His baptismal name, Domenico, means "of the Lord" and the surname Savio means "wise". His father was a blacksmith and his mother, a seamstress. His parents had ten children in all. The family was described as poor, hardworking and pious.

When he was two years old, his parents returned to their hometown at Murialdo on the outskirts of Castelnuovo d'Asti and from where they had gone to Riva in 1841. His parents took great care to give him a Christian upbringing. By the age of four, he was able to pray by himself and was occasionally found in solitude, praying. John Bosco records that Savio's parents recollect how he used to help his mother around the house, welcome his father home, say his prayers without being reminded, (even reminding others when they forgot) and say Grace at mealtimes unfailingly.

=== At the village school ===
Giovanni Zucca from Murialdo, who was then the chaplain at Murialdo when Dominic was five years old, notes in a statement to John Bosco that he came to notice Dominic due to his regular church attendance with his mother, and his habit of kneeling down outside the church to pray (even in the mud or snow) if he happened to come to church before it had been unlocked in the morning. The chaplain also notes that Savio made good progress at the village school not merely due to his cleverness, but also by working hard. He would not join the other boys in doing something that he believed to be morally wrong and would explain why he thought a particular deed was wrong.

At the age of five, he learned to serve Mass, and would try to participate at Mass every day as well as go regularly to Confession. Having been permitted to make his First Communion at an early age, he had much reverence for the Eucharist.

=== First Communion ===
At that time, it was customary for children to receive their First Communion at the age of twelve. (Pope Pius X would later lower this age to seven.) After initial hesitation, and subsequent consultation with other priests, the parish priest agreed to permit Dominic to receive his First Communion at the age of seven, since he knew the catechism and understood something of the Eucharist. He spent much time praying and reading in preparation, asking his mother's forgiveness for anything he might have done to displease her and then went to church. In his biography of Dominic Savio, John Bosco devotes a chapter to tell of Dominic's First Communion. He says that several years later, whenever he talked of the day of his First Communion, he said with joy: "That was the happiest and most wonderful day of my life." John Bosco records that on the day of his First Communion, Dominic made some promises which he wrote in a "little book", and re-read them many times. John Bosco once looked through Dominic's book, and he quotes from it the promises that he made:

Resolutions made by me, Dominic Savio, in the year 1849, on the day of my First Communion, at the age of seven.

1. I will go to Confession often, and as frequently to Holy Communion as my confessor allows.
2. I wish to sanctify the Sundays and festivals in a special manner.
3. My friends shall be Jesus and Mary.
4. Death rather than sin.

=== At the county school ===
For secondary education, Dominic had to go to another school and it was decided that he would go to the County School at Castelnuovo, three miles (5 km) from his home. (Castelnuovo d' Asti, now Castelnuovo John Bosco, was the birthplace of another contemporary of John Bosco, Joseph Cafasso, also a saint. He was four years the senior of John Bosco, and was Bosco's mentor and advisor.)

Now ten years old, he walked daily to and from school. In his biography of Dominic Savio, John Bosco records how a local farmer once asked him, on a hot sunny day, if he was not tired from walking, and received the reply: "Nothing seems tiresome or painful when you are working for a master who pays well." Don Bosco also notes that Dominic refused to go swimming with his friends since Dominic considered that in such a situation, it would be "also easy to offend God", he believed that on a previous occasion his friends behaved in, what was to him, a vulgar manner. One account of his time at the county school was when two classmates who hated each other prepared to resolve their differences in a rock fight. Dominic stood between them holding the cross and explaining that whatever they do they do unto Christ; ergo they should throw rocks at him instead. The fight was defused when both boys laughed and considered such a concept silly. In his biography Bosco records that Allora, the head of this school, had this to say about Dominic: "...Hence it may very well be said that he was Savio (wise), not only in name, but in fact, viz., in his studies, in piety, in conversation and his dealing with others, and in all his actions. ..."

=== Under John Bosco's mentorship ===
==== Meeting with John Bosco ====
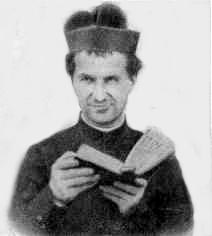
John Bosco (Don Bosco), the spiritual mentor of Dominic Savio

It was his teacher at school, Giuseppe Cugliero, who gave a high account of him to John Bosco and recommended that Bosco meet him during the Feast of the Rosary, when he would take his boys to Murialdo. Accordingly, accompanied by his father, Dominic met John Bosco on 2 October 1854, the first Monday of that month. John Bosco records this conversation in some detail. He notes that Dominic was eager to go to Turin with John Bosco, and that he wished to become a priest after completing his studies in that town.

To test Dominic's intelligence, Don Bosco gave him a copy of The Catholic Readings (pamphlets on the subject of Catholic apologetics), asking him to recite a particular page by heart and explain its meaning the next day, and then spoke for a while with Dominic's father. Ten minutes later, he found Dominic was beside him reciting the page and explaining its meaning satisfactorily. This meeting was the beginning of their relationship, the result of which was that John Bosco agreed to take Dominic to Turin with him.

==== At the Oratory of St. Francis de Sales ====
John Bosco records that when Dominic arrived at the Oratory, he at once placed himself under his guidance. He also notes that Dominic worked diligently and followed the school rules. He would happily listen to talks and sermons (even if they tended to be lengthy at times), and would, without hesitation, ask for clarification on points that were not clear to him. John Bosco also notes how Dominic was obedient to his teachers and chose his companions carefully.

This happened in 1854, when, in Rome, the dogma of the Immaculate Conception of Mary was being defined. Preparations for the observation of this feast were thus going on at the Oratory. Don Bosco records that, at the advice of his confessor, Dominic renewed his First Communion promises at the altar of Mary at the Oratory. Bosco says that, from this point the result of Dominic's attempts towards holy life were so apparent, that he (John Bosco) took to recording the various incidents that occurred for future reference.

John Bosco's mother, who was called "Mamma Margaret" remarked to him of Dominic, "You have many good boys, but none can match the good heart and soul of Dominic Savio. I see him so often at prayer, staying in church after the others; every day he slips out of the playground to make a visit to the Blessed Sacrament. When he is in church he is like an angel living in Paradise."

==== Resolve to become a saint ====
Around six months after Dominic had come to the Oratory, he had the occasion to listen to a talk on sainthood. John Bosco records that the talk had three main points that impressed Dominic:

1. That it is God's will that each one should become a saint.
2. That it is easy to become a saint.
3. That there is a great reward waiting in heaven for those who try to become saints.

This inspired Dominic to take a conscious decision to become a saint. The immediate result of this was that, not being sure how to live a saintly life, and worried about it, he was quiet and worried for the next few days. Noticing this, John Bosco spoke to him and advised him to resume his customary cheerfulness, persevere in his regular life of study and religious practices, and especially not neglect being with his companions in games and recreation. On learning that his first name meant "belonging to God", his desire to be a saint intensified. Dominic's spiritual growth progressed under the guidance of Don Bosco. Clifford Stevens says in his biography of Savio, "In other circumstances, Dominic might have become a little self-righteous snob, but Don Bosco showed him the heroism of the ordinary and the sanctity of common sense."

==== Attempts to do penances ====
In his desire to become a saint, Dominic attempted to perform physical penances, like making his bed uncomfortable with small stones and pieces of wood, sleeping with a thin covering in winter, wearing a hair shirt, fasting on bread and water, walking slowly during very cold weather to suffer more and pricking himself with a pen nib or needle. When his superiors (i.e., John Bosco, or his rector, or his confessor) learned of this, they forbade him from doing bodily mortification, as it would affect his health.

John Bosco told Dominic that as a schoolboy, the best penance would be to perform all his duties with perfection and humility, and that obedience was the greatest sacrifice. Thus, he formed an important aspect of his philosophy of life, which was, in his words, "I can't do big things but I want everything to be for the glory of God." Don Bosco notes that from that time on, Dominic did not complain about the food or the weather, unlike some other boys at the Oratory, bore all suffering cheerfully, and practised custody of his eyes and tongue. Eugenio Ceria, a Salesian commentator on the autobiography of John Bosco, (Memoirs of the Oratory of Saint Francis de Sales) notes that by this time, owing to his experience as an educator, John Bosco's ideas on several pedagogical and spiritual principles were well developed and linked and this led him to associate the fulfillment of daily duties with holiness in his advice to Savio.

==== The Immaculate Conception Sodality ====
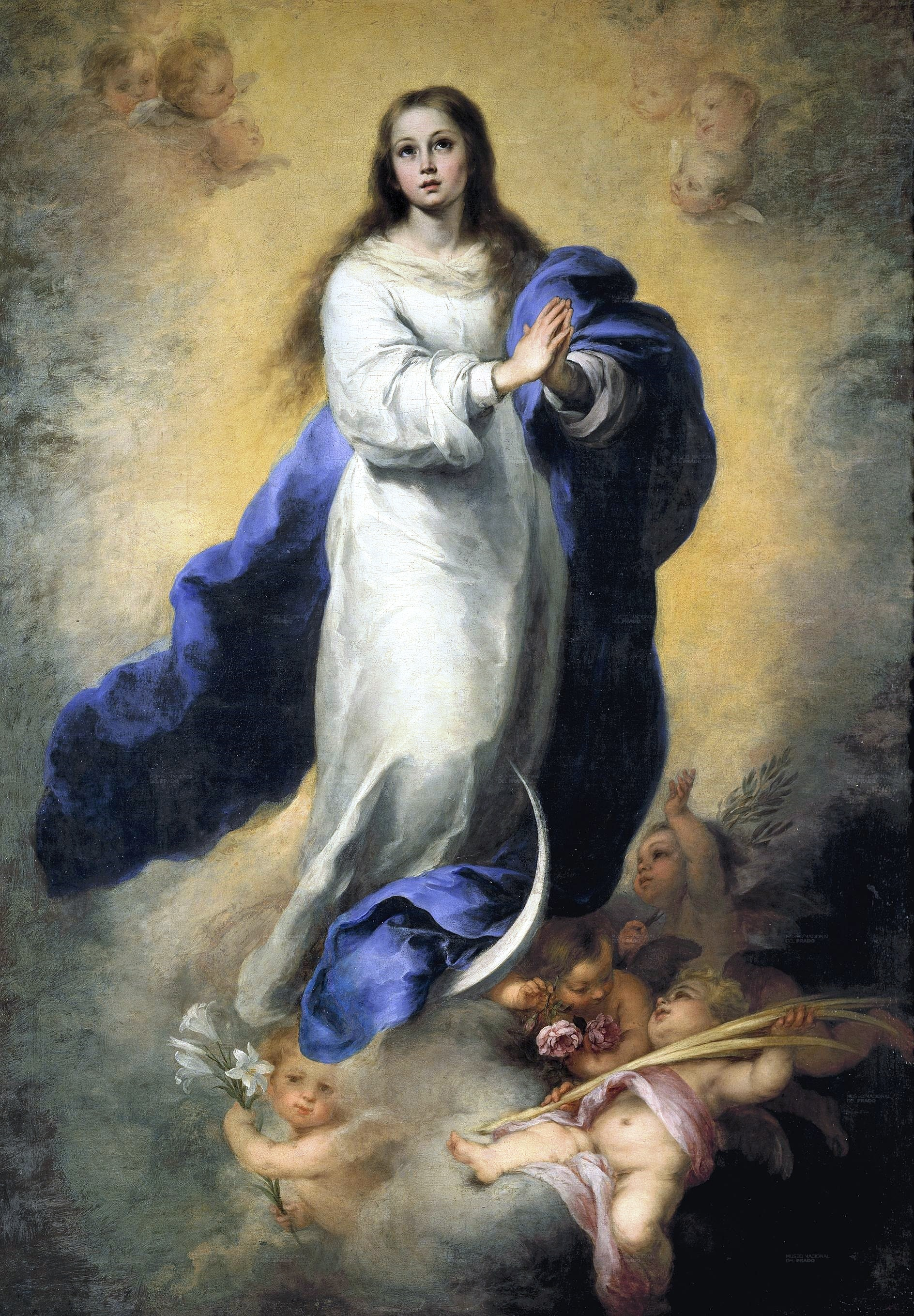
An iconic painting depicting Mary as the Immaculate Conception. The definition of the dogma of the Immaculate Conception had a profound effect on the spirituality of Dominic Savio.

The definition of the dogma of the Immaculate Conception of Mary influenced Dominic and he was anxious to create at the school a lasting reminder of this event. He now felt that he had not long to live. With the help of his friends, he started a group called the Sodality of Mary Immaculate, the main aim of which was to be to obtain the special protection of Mary during life and at the time of death. The means Dominic proposed to this end were: (1) to honour, and to bring others to honour, Mary by different means, and (2) to encourage frequent Communion. On 8 June, he and his friends read out together before the altar of Mary at the Oratory, the set of rules they had drawn up. There were twenty-one articles (which were recorded by John Bosco in his biography), ending with an appeal to Mary for her assistance. These were submitted to the rector, and, after careful perusal, he gave his approval, under certain conditions. One of the members of this Sodality, Giuseppe Bongioanni, (who was later ordained a priest) was later to found the Sodality of the Blessed Sacrament, which became a traditional sodality in Catholic schools.

==== Preparation for a holy death ====
All the pupils under John Bosco observed a monthly event called The Exercise of a Happy Death; this practice continues under the name The Monthly Day of Recollection. This practice was encouraged by Pope Pius IX. Part of this was to make a Confession and Communion as though they were the last ones to be made before death. Bosco notes that Dominic observed this practice devoutly, and that one day, Dominic said that he would be the first amongst the group to die. During the month of May, before his death, the intensity of his spiritual practices increased. John Bosco notes that he said, "Let me do what I can this year; if I am here next year I'll let you know what my plans are."

==== Failing health ====
Dominic's health was steadily deteriorating, but he spent most of his time with his friends, talking with them, and encouraging those who were experiencing troubles. He also helped at the school infirmary whenever his companions were admitted. On the recommendation of doctors, Dominic was sent home to recover from his ill health, but a few days later Bosco found him back at the Oratory. Despite his affection for Dominic, and his wish to allow Dominic to remain at the Oratory, John Bosco decided to follow the recommendation of the doctors, especially since Dominic had developed a severe cough and he wrote to Dominic's father, fixing the date of his departure on 1 March 1857. Though Dominic said that he wanted to spend his last days at the Oratory, he accepted this decision and spent the evening before his departure at John Bosco's side, discussing spiritual matters. (Bosco recorded a part of this conversation in his biography of Dominic.) On the morning of his departure, Don Bosco notes that Dominic made the Exercise of a Happy Death with great zeal, even saying that this would be his final such devotion. He said his farewell to John Bosco, asking as a keepsake that Bosco add his name to the list of those who would participate in the Plenary Indulgence that John Bosco had received from the Pope, to which John Bosco readily agreed. He then took leave of his friends with great affection, which surprised them, for his illness was not considered by many of his companions to be serious.

=== Death ===
The altar of St. Dominic Savio in Basilica of Our Lady Help of Christians, Turin, under which is held the relic of the saint

In his first four days at home his appetite decreased and his cough worsened; this prompted his parents to send him to the doctor, who, at once, ordered bed rest. Inflammation was diagnosed, and as was the custom at that time, the doctor decided to perform bloodletting. The doctor cut Dominic's arm ten times in the space of four days and it is now considered that this probably hastened his death. In his biography, John Bosco records that Dominic was calm throughout the procedure. The doctor assured his parents that the danger had passed and now it only remained for him to recuperate. Dominic, however, was sure that his death was approaching, and asked that he be allowed to make his Confession and receive Communion. Though they thought it unnecessary, his parents sent for the parish priest who heard Dominic's confession and administered the Eucharist.

After four days, despite the conviction of the doctor and his parents that he would get better, Dominic asked that he be given Extreme Unction in preparation for death. Again, his parents agreed, to please him. On 9 March, he was given the papal blessing and he said the Confiteor. Don Bosco records that throughout these days, he stayed serene and calm. On the evening of 9 March 1857, after being visited by his parish priest, he asked his father to read him the prayers for the Exercise of a Happy Death from his book of devotions. Then he slept a while, and shortly awakened and said in a clear voice, "Goodbye, Dad, goodbye ... what was it the parish priest suggested to me ... I don't seem to remember ... Oh, what wonderful things I see ...". With these words, Dominic died, though, at first, it appeared to his father that he was asleep. His father wrote in a letter to John Bosco, conveying the news of the death of his son,

With my heart full of grief I send you this sad news. Dominic, my dear son and your child in God, like a white lily, like Aloysius Gonzaga, gave his soul to God on 9 March after having received with the greatest devotion the Last Sacraments and the Papal Blessing.

== Notable incidents in the life of Dominic Savio ==
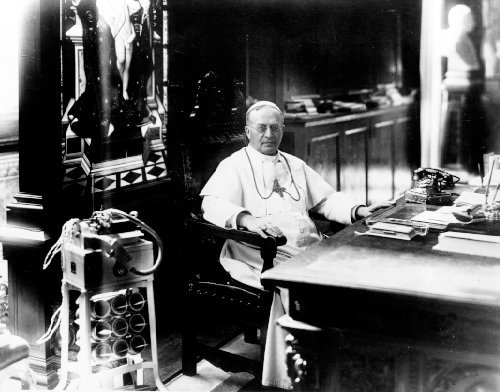
Pope Pius XI described Dominic Savio as "small in size, but a towering giant in spirit."

In order to give the reader a full picture of Dominic's personality, Don Bosco recorded several incidents from Dominic's life in his biography.

=== Before he joined the Oratory ===
==== At the school at Mondonio ====
Don Bosco records this from the testimony of Giuseppe Cugliero. One day, in the absence of his teacher, two of Dominic's classmates stuffed the room-heating iron stove with snow and rubbish as a prank. Fearing expulsion, they blamed Dominic. Cugliero soundly berated Dominic in front of the class and Dominic bore this silently. The following day, the true culprits were discovered. On being asked why he had remained silent, Dominic replied that he had thought that he would be let off with a scolding whereas the other boys might have been expelled. Dominic added that Jesus had remained silent when blamed unjustly and that he was trying to imitate him. Mary Reed Newland, in her book, suggests that, since Dominic was yet to meet John Bosco, this incident is indicative of the upbringing his parents had given him.

=== At the Oratory ===
==== Resolves a conflict ====
At the Oratory, two of his friends had a disagreement and decided to fight each other by throwing stones. As they were older and stronger than Dominic (he had been promoted from first form to second form) physical intervention was not possible. He tried to reason with them but with no positive result. Thus, on the day of the fight, he went with them to the site where the fight was to take place, and just before they could start, he placed himself between them, and holding up his crucifix, requested that they throw their first stones at him. Ashamed, the two boys gave up their fight. Dominic then persuaded them to go to Confession.

==== Custody of the eyes ====
John Bosco records that once a boy who was visiting had brought with him a "magazine with bad pictures", and a group of fascinated boys were looking. On finding out, Dominic snatched the magazine and tore it up, saying, "You know well enough that one look is enough to stain your souls, and yet you go feasting your eyes on this."

==== Influence over his friends ====
John Bosco records that Dominic spent a lot of time with his friends, encouraging them in their devotions, discouraging those with a habit of swearing, and teaching Catechism at Sunday School. Bosco also records that he would encourage his friends to make frequent use of the sacrament of confession and take Communion regularly, even giving them encouragement and advice in spiritual practices during games. John Bosco makes particular mention of two of Dominic's friends, Camillo Gavio of Tortona, and John Massaglia of Marmorito. (These two friends were dead by the time John Bosco wrote the biography, as he thought it best not to write about the friends of Dominic who were still alive.)

==== Devotions practised by Dominic ====
John Bosco narrates that before he came to the Oratory, Dominic made his Confession and took Communion once a month. After hearing a homily on the Sacraments, he chose a priest as his regular Confessor, (to whom Dominic made his Confessions until the end of his stay at the Oratory). The regularity with which Dominic approached the sacraments increased and, at the end of that year, as per the advice of his confessor, Dominic was taking Communion daily. He had a special intention for the Eucharist each day of the week. John Bosco notes that, whenever permitted, Dominic eagerly accompanied the priest when he took the Viaticum, and that he also kept the habit of kneeling down in the street if he encountered the Eucharist being carried by a priest, as was the custom in Catholic countries.

=== Incidents with special spiritual significance ===
==== "Distractions" ====
John Bosco records that Dominic occasionally had intense experiences during prayer, which Dominic described as such: "It is silly of me; I get a distraction and lose the thread of my prayers and then I see such wonderful things that the hours pass by like minutes". On one occasion, he was missing from breakfast and the rector finally found him in the chapel, standing motionless and gazing at the tabernacle. He was not aware that the morning Mass had ended. On another occasion, John Bosco records that he saw Dominic in the chapel, speaking to God, and then waiting, as though listening to a reply.

==== Special knowledge ====
John Bosco narrates how Dominic came to his room one day and urged him to accompany him. He led Bosco through many streets to a block of flats, rang the doorbell, and at once, went away. When the door opened, John Bosco found that within, there was a dying man who was desperately asking for a priest to make his last confession. Later, John Bosco asked Dominic how he had known about that man. However, since the question made Dominic uncomfortable, John Bosco did not press the matter.

==== The vision of England ====
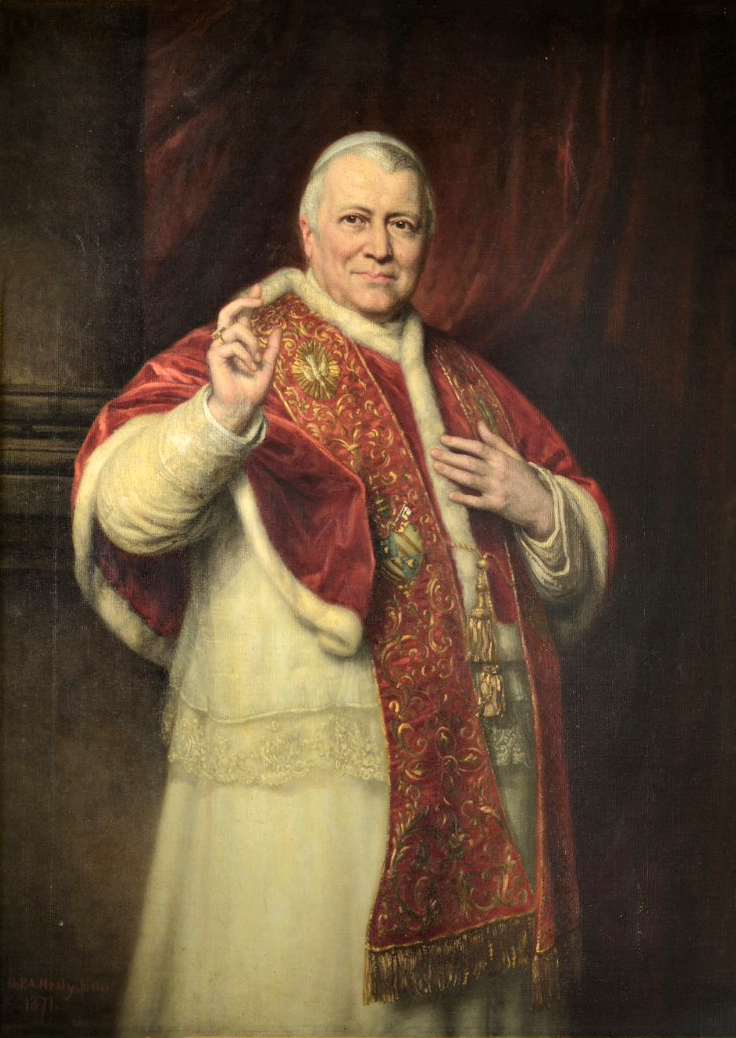
Pope Pius IX formally defined the dogma of the Immaculate Conception and figured in a vision that occurred to Dominic Savio.

John Bosco records that Dominic once recounted to him a vision he had:

...One morning as I was making my thanksgiving after Communion, a very strong distraction took hold of me. I thought I saw a great plain full of people enveloped in thick fog. They were walking about like people who had lost their way and did not know which way to turn. Someone near me said: "This is England". I was just going to ask some questions, when I saw Pope Pius IX just like I have seen him in pictures. He was robed magnificently and carried in his hand a torch alive with flames. As he walked slowly towards that immense gathering of people, the leaping flames from the torch dispelled the fog, and the people stood in the splendour of the noonday sun. "That torch", said the one beside me, "is the Catholic Faith, which is going to light up England"

At his last goodbyes, Dominic requested John Bosco to tell the pope of his vision, which he did in 1858. The pope felt that this confirmed the plans he had already made concerning England.

==== His mother's pregnancy ====
On 12 September 1856, Dominic asked John Bosco permission to go home, saying that his mother was ill, though he had received no communication. Dominic's mother was then expecting a baby and was in great pain, and when Dominic reached the house, he hugged and kissed his mother, and then left. His mother felt her pain leave her and Dominic's baby sister, Catherine, was born. The women assisting at the birth found that Dominic had left a green scapular around his mother's neck. His sister Theresa later wore this same scapular when she was in labour. She testified that it had been passed around to several other pregnant women and was later lost.

==== Charles Savio's vision of Dominic after his death ====
The veneration of Dominic Savio grew with an event narrated by his father:

I was in the greatest affliction at the loss of my son, and was consumed by a desire to know what was his position in the other world. God deigned to comfort me. About a month after his death, during a very restless night, I saw, as it were, the ceiling opened, and Dominic appeared in the midst of dazzling light. I was beside myself at this sight, and cried out: "O Dominic, my son, are you already in Paradise?" "Yes," he replied, "I am in Heaven." "Then pray for your brothers and sisters, and your mother and father, that we may all come to join you one day in Heaven." "Yes, yes, I will pray," was the answer. Then he disappeared, and the room became as before.

== The Life of Dominic Savio ==
Soon after the death of Dominic, John Bosco wrote his biography, The Life of Dominic Savio, which contributed to his canonisation. The original Italian edition was considered so well written during the time of Don Bosco that, along with his History of Italy and Ecclesiastical History, it was used in many public schools as part of the course materials on the Italian language.

== Veneration ==
Though some were of an opinion that Dominic was too young to be canonised, Pope Pius X insisted that this was not so, and started the process of his canonisation. Dominic Savio was declared Venerable in 1933 by Pope Pius XI, was beatified on 5 March 1950 by Pope Pius XII, and was declared a saint in 1954. Pope Pius XI described him as "small in size, but a towering giant in spirit."

Turin's Basilica of Mary Help of Christians is his burial place. There are several parishes with his patronage (Slavonski Brod etc.).

== See also ==
- Carlo Acutis, an Italian teenager who was canonised on September 7 2025.
- Altar server
