= Montaldo Torinese =

- Comune
- Comune di Montaldo Torinese
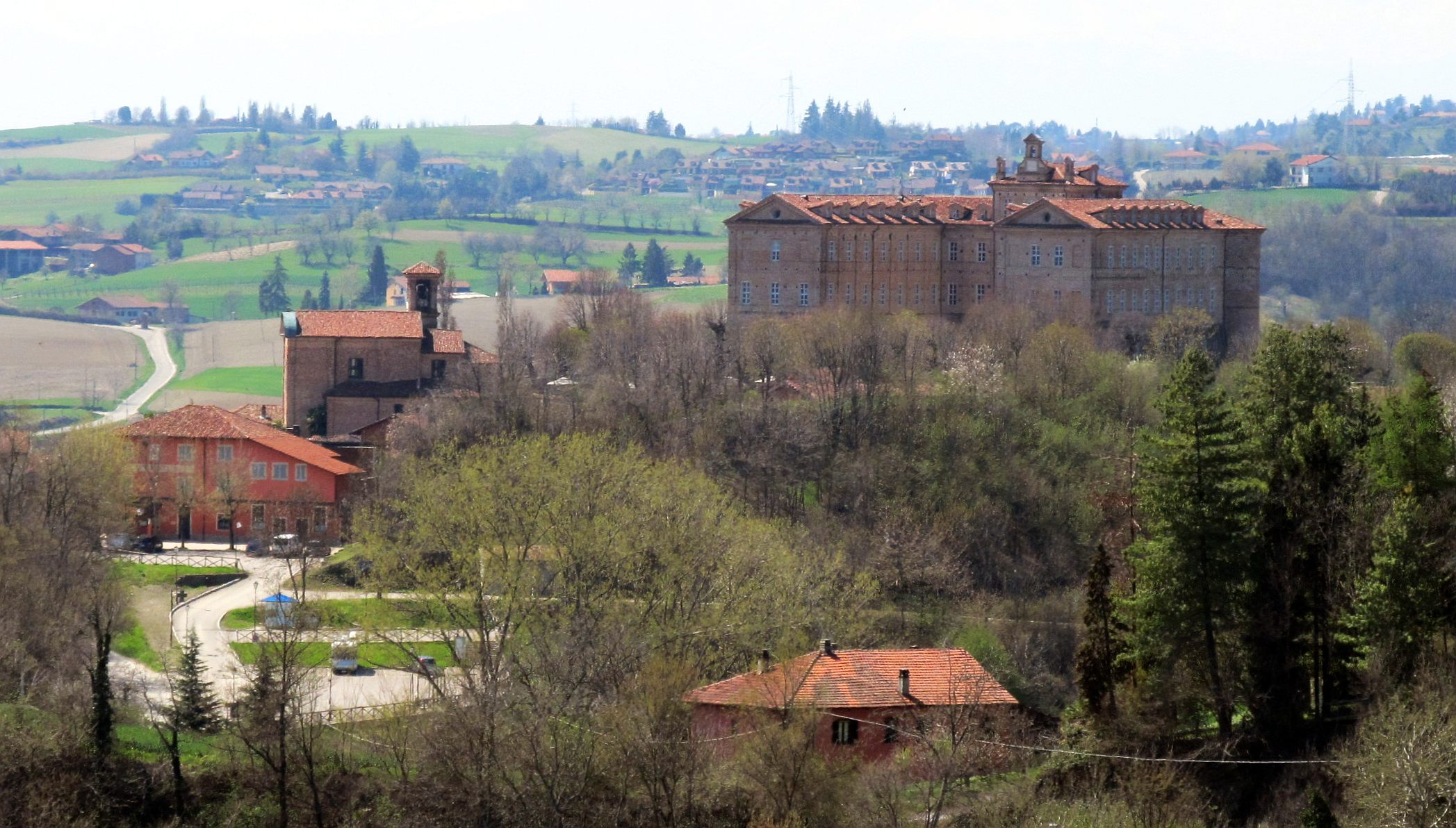

- Coat of arms

- Location within Italy Location within Piedmont
- Coordinates: 45°03′56″N 7°50′59″E
- Country: Italy
- Region: Piedmont
- Metropolitan city: Turin (TO)

Government
  - Mayor: Valerio Soldani

Area
  - Total: 4.7 km^{2} (1.8 sq mi)
- Elevation: 375 m (1,230 ft)

Population (31 December 2010)
  - Total: 714
  - Density: 150/km^{2} (390/sq mi)
- Demonym: Montaldesi
- Time zone: UTC+1 (CET)
  - Summer (DST): UTC+2 (CEST)
- Postal code: 10020
- Dialing code: 011
- Website: Official website

Montaldo Torinese is a comune (municipality) in the Metropolitan City of Turin in the Italian region Piedmont, located about 12 kilometres (7 mi) east of Turin.

Montaldo Torinese borders the following municipalities: Gassino Torinese, Sciolze, Marentino, Pavarolo, Chieri, and Andezeno.
