= Vezzolano Abbey =

Building in Albugnano, Italy

Coordinates: 45.0803°N 7.9569°E

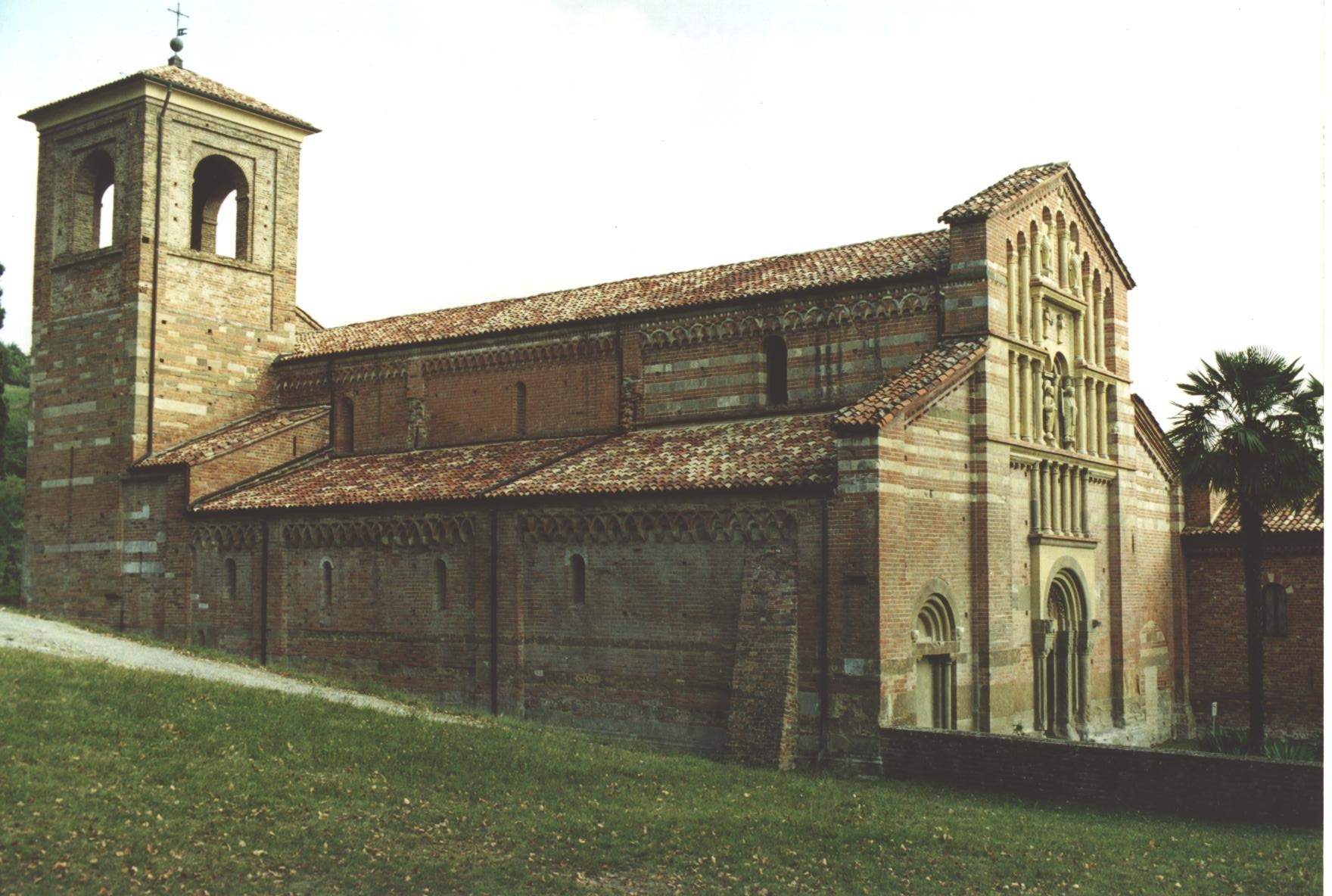
Vezzolano Abbey.

The Abbey of Vezzolano is an abbey in the territory of Albugnano, Piedmont, northern Italy, in Gothic–Romanesque style.

== History ==
According to a legend, the foundation of the abbey dates to Charlemagne times. Here he would be hunting, in the year 773, when three skeletons appeared to him from the tomb. He thus decided to build an abbey here entitled to the Virgin Mary.

Historically, the abbey most likely existed in Lombard times, and later was enlarged thanks to rich donations. In the 10th century it was destroyed by the Saracens. In 1002 it was donated by King Arduin of Italy to Oddo of Bruzolo, whose heirs gave it to the prepository of Vezzolano. The complex was rebuilt until 1189. The abbey was the seat of a religious community until the early 19th century, when it was suppressed during the Napoleonic invasion of Italy.

== Architecture ==
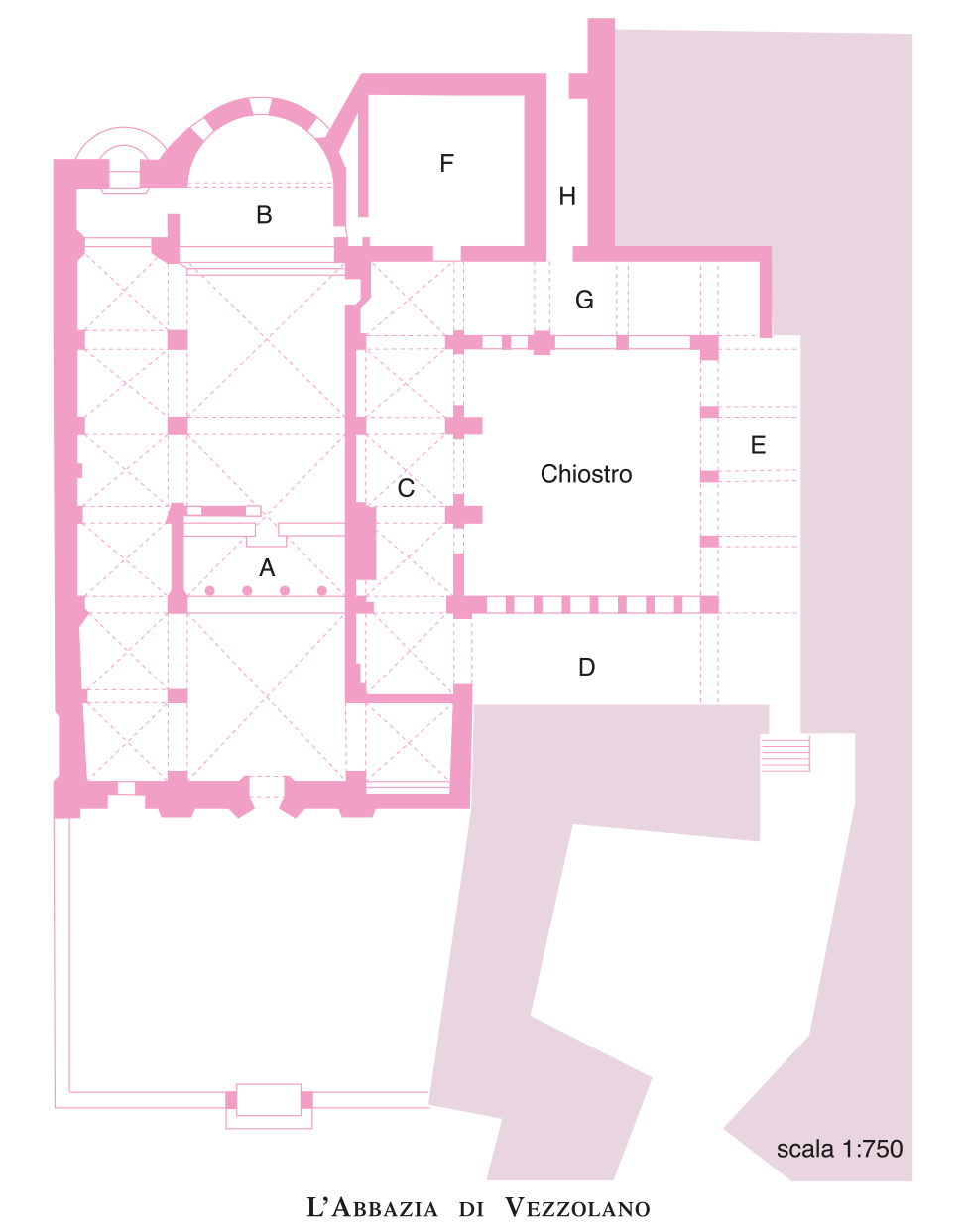
Plan of the church

The abbey includes a church with a short bell tower, a cloister and a capitular hall, featuring both Gothic and Romanesque elements. For the construction sandstone and bricks were used to give a bichrome appearance to the exterior (such as in the upper façade), a feature common also in Liguria and Tuscany in the Middle Ages. In the Romanesque façade, two of the three original portals are still existing. The upper part also features small columns with arches, with a mullioned window in the middle, with Christ flanked by the archangels Michael and Raphael.

Over the window is a pronaos with two angels holding a candle, along with medallions in polychrome ceramics. Over them are two seraphims over a wheel, in turn surmounted by a niche with Christ Blessing.

The Romanesque bell tower was remade in the upper part.

The cloister has columns and capitals in different styles. It has cycle of frescoes with Christ between the Symbols of the Evangelists, the Adoration of the Magii, a Dead Man in Red Toga and Contrast between Three Dead and Three Living Men, the latter perhaps a representation of the legend of Charlemagne.

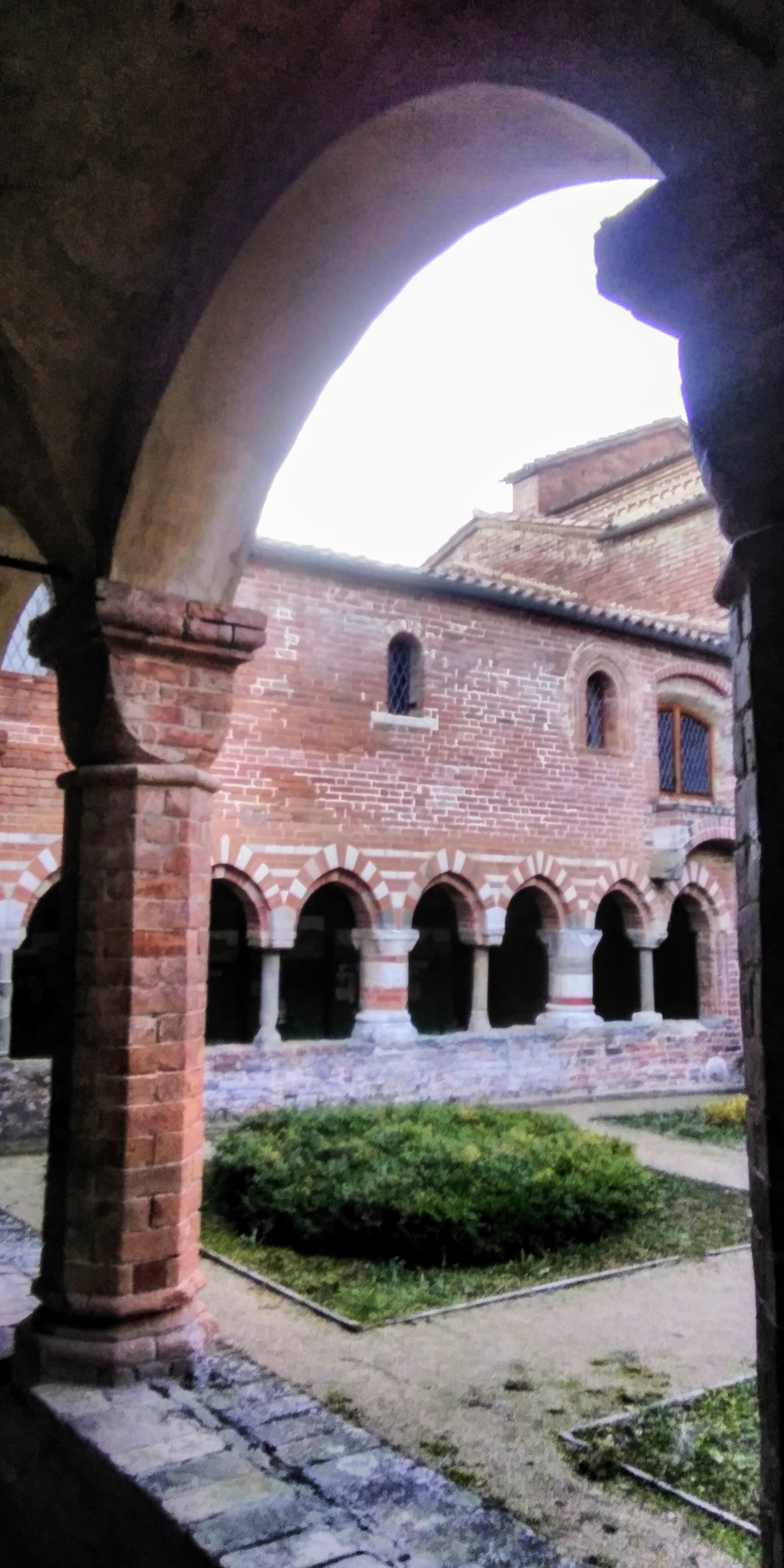
Partial view of the cloisters

== Interior ==
Today the interior of the church has only the nave and one aisle, as the right aisle was annexed to the cloister. Two apses are present, the right one having been eliminated to build the Capitular Hall.

The vaults have ogival arches, while the nave is divided in two by a wall inspired to the French jubé. The latter has five ogival arches, and is decorated by two rows of polychrome sculptures. In the lower one is a series of 36 ancestors of Jesus, following the genealogy of Jesus as mentioned in the Gospel of Matthew; the first two and the last two ancestors have been painted on the pillars next to the choir screen. In the upper row are scenes of the life of Mary (Deposition, Triumph in Heaven, Assumption) from the late 12th century Burgundian school.

The high altar has, in a tabernacle, a colored terracotta triptych from the mid-15th century, while behind are two Romanesque bas-reliefs in stone, depicting the Archangel Gabriel and the Madonna. The access to the cloister is surmounted by a lunette in Gothic style, portraying the Virgin Enthroned with two angels.

== Bibliography ==
- Salerno, Paola (1997). Santa Maria di Vezzolano: il pontile : ricerche e restauri (in Italian). U. Allemandi. ISBN 978-88-422-0775-7.
