= Gassino Torinese =

- Comune
- Comune di Gassino Torinese
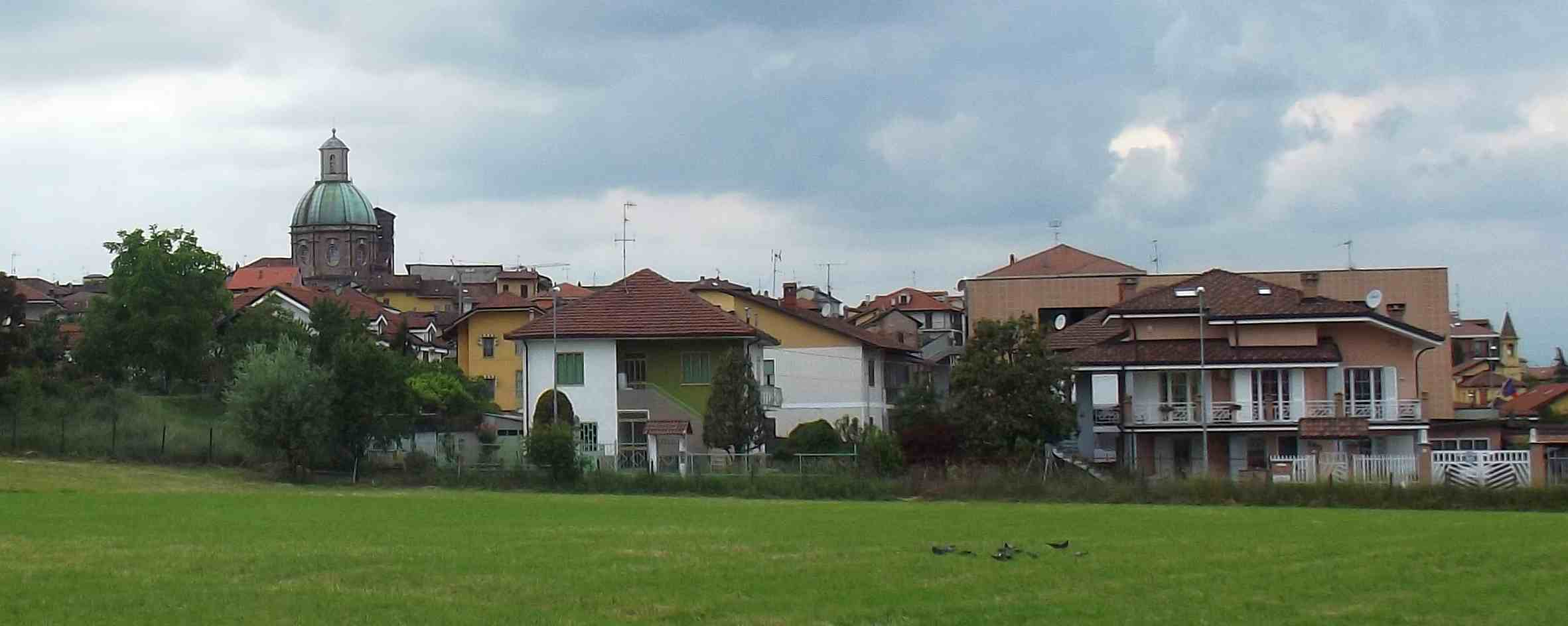

- Coat of arms

- Location within Italy Location within Piedmont
- Coordinates: 45°8′N 7°49′E
- Country: Italy
- Region: Piedmont
- Metropolitan city: Turin (TO)

Government
  - Mayor: Cristian Corrado

Area
  - Total: 20.5 km^{2} (7.9 sq mi)
- Elevation: 230 m (750 ft)

Population (31 August 2021)
  - Total: 9,332
  - Density: 455/km^{2} (1,180/sq mi)
- Demonym: Gassinesi
- Time zone: UTC+1 (CET)
  - Summer (DST): UTC+2 (CEST)
- Postal code: 10090
- Dialing code: 011
- Website: Official website

Gassino Torinese is a comune (municipality) in the Metropolitan City of Turin in the Italian region Piedmont, located about 12 kilometres (7 mi) northeast of Turin.

Gassino Torinese borders the following municipalities: Settimo Torinese, San Raffaele Cimena, Rivalba, Castiglione Torinese, Sciolze, Pavarolo, Montaldo Torinese.

Main sights include Bardassano Castle.
