= Moncucco Torinese =

- Comune
- Comune di Moncucco Torinese
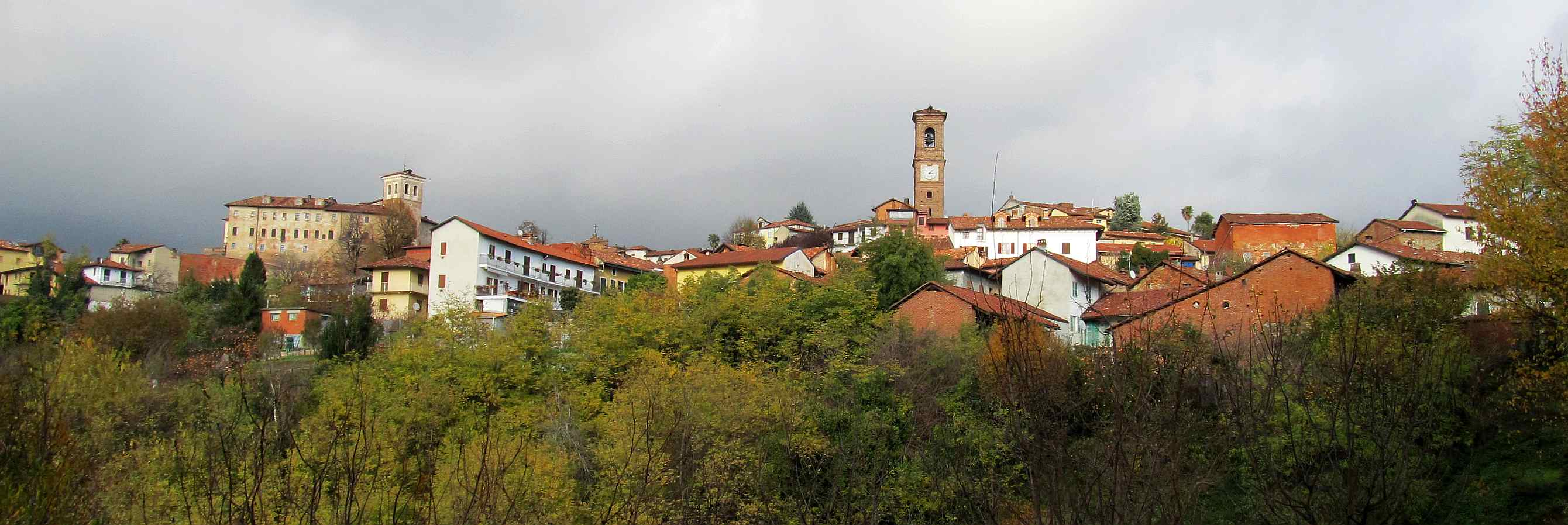
- View of Moncucco Torinese

- Coat of arms

- Location within Italy Location within Piedmont
- Coordinates: 45°4′N 7°56′E
- Country: Italy
- Region: Piedmont
- Province: Asti (AT)
- Frazioni: Barbaso, Borelli, Briano, Moglia, Pogliano, Rivalta, Roasine, San Giorgio, San Giuseppe, San Paolo

Government
  - Mayor: Luigi Rigon

Area
  - Total: 14.4 km^{2} (5.6 sq mi)
- Elevation: 403 m (1,322 ft)

Population (31 December 2010)
  - Total: 891
  - Density: 61.9/km^{2} (160/sq mi)
- Demonym: Moncucchesi
- Time zone: UTC+1 (CET)
  - Summer (DST): UTC+2 (CEST)
- Postal code: 14024
- Dialing code: 011
- Patron saint: St. Bernardino of Siena
- Saint day: September 20
- Website: Official website

Moncucco Torinese is a comune (municipality) in the Province of Asti in the Italian region Piedmont, located about 20 kilometres (12 mi) east of Turin and about 30 kilometres (19 mi) northwest of Asti.

It has a castle (14th century), housing a Museum of Chalk.

Moncucco Torinese borders the following municipalities: Albugnano, Arignano, Berzano di San Pietro, Castelnuovo Don Bosco, Cinzano, Marentino, Mombello di Torino, Moriondo Torinese, and Sciolze.
