= Bardassano Castle =

Castle in Piedmont, Italy

- Castello di Bardassano
- Gassino Torinese, Piedmont, Italy
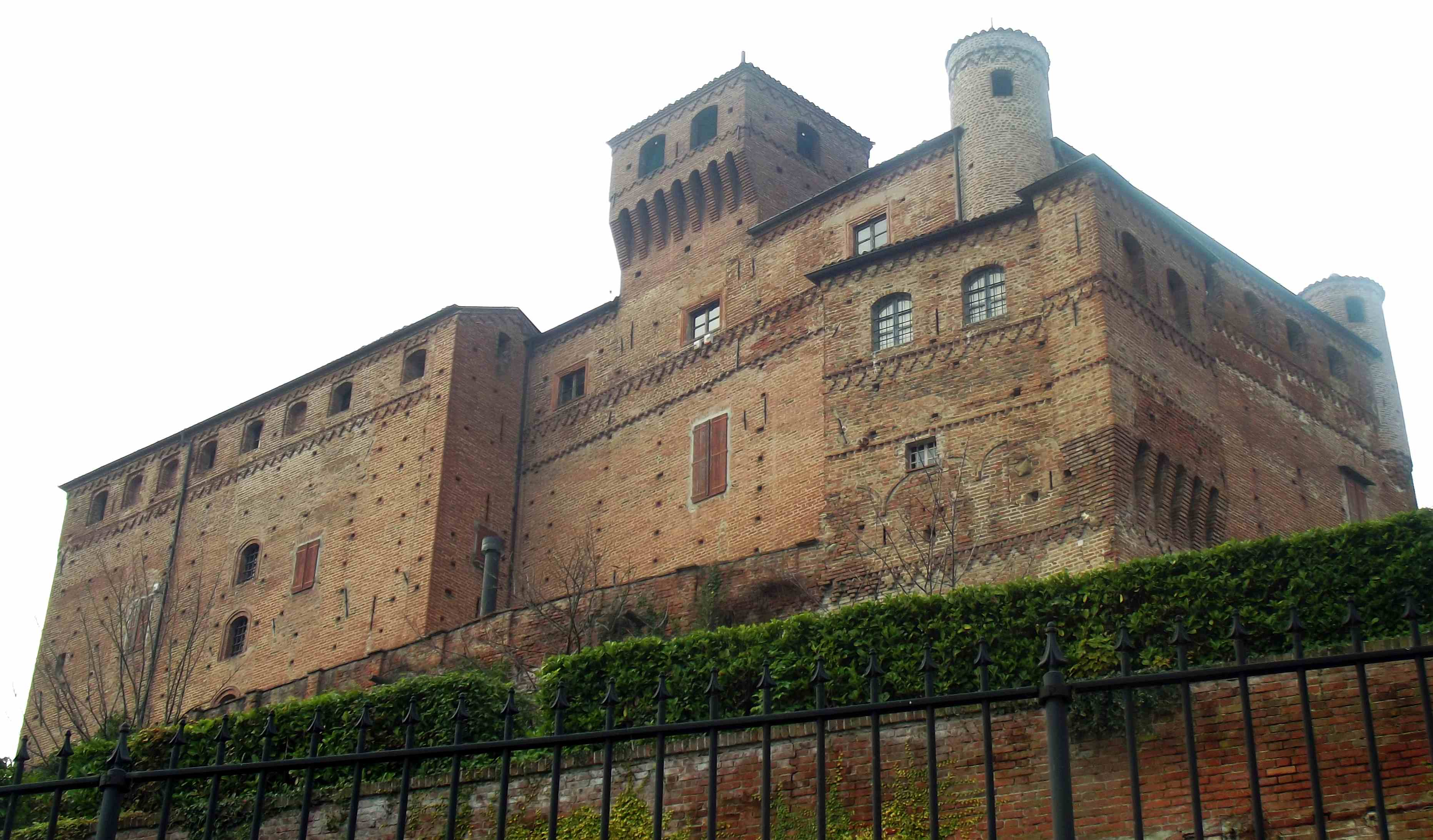
- Bardassano Castle in 2014

Site information
- Type: Castle

Location
- Coordinates: 45°05′50.13″N 7°50′31.43″E

Bardassano Castle (Italian: Castello di Bardassano) is a castle located in Gassino Torinese, Piedmont, Italy.

== History ==
The castle is said to have hosted Emperor Barbarossa in 1156 after the siege of Chieri, although there is no documentary evidence to support this claim.

First recorded in 1290 when it came under the control of the comune of Chieri, the castle served as a fortified stronghold for the Republic of Chieri against the Marquis of Monferrat. It was largely reshaped during the 14th century. Major works took place in the 17th century, when parts of the outer fortifications were converted into garden terraces. Over time, it passed through the hands of the Sumont, Provana, Balbo Bertone, and Villa families before reaching its current owners, the Giriodi di Panissera di Monastero.

The castle was restored in modern times by architect Carlo Nigra.

== Description ==
The main structure consists of a sturdy brick building with round corner towers and a keep aligned with the curtain wall. Later, an additional wing without towers was built, extending beyond the original structure.

== Gallery ==
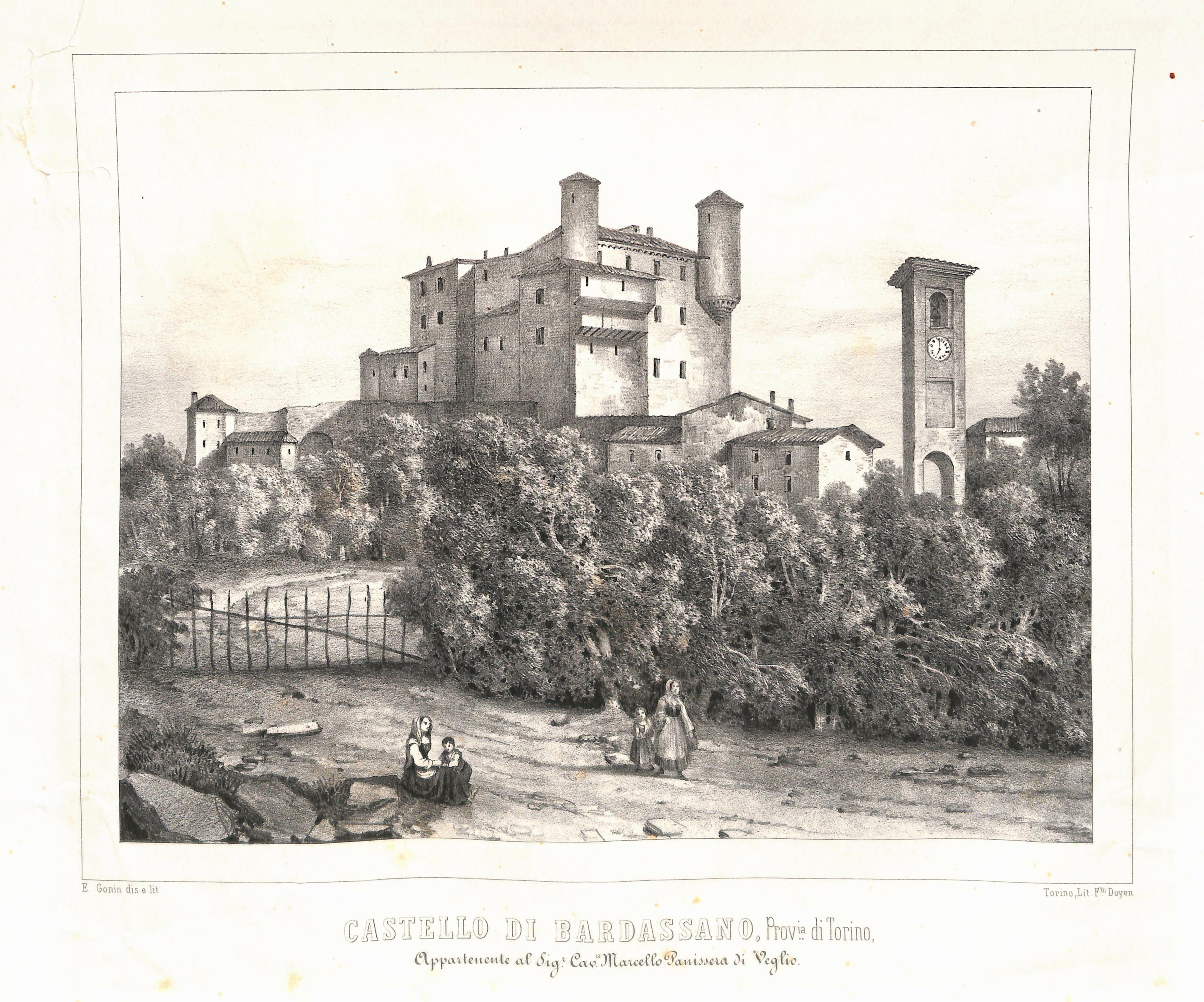

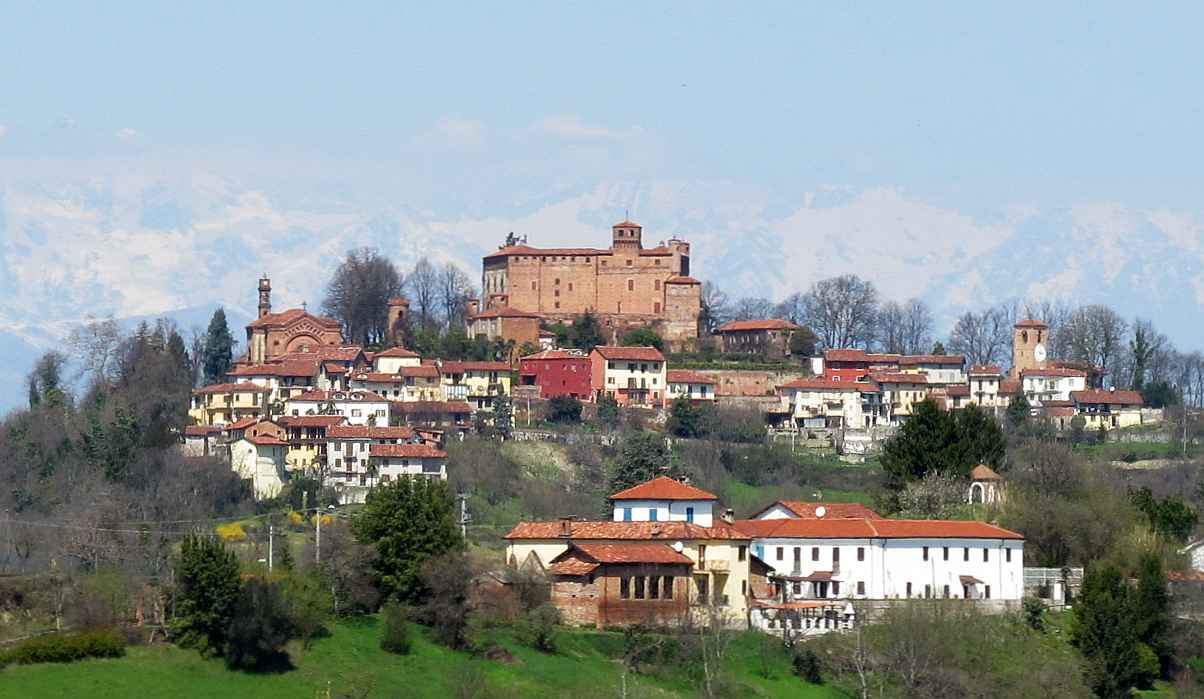
