= Luigi Comollo =

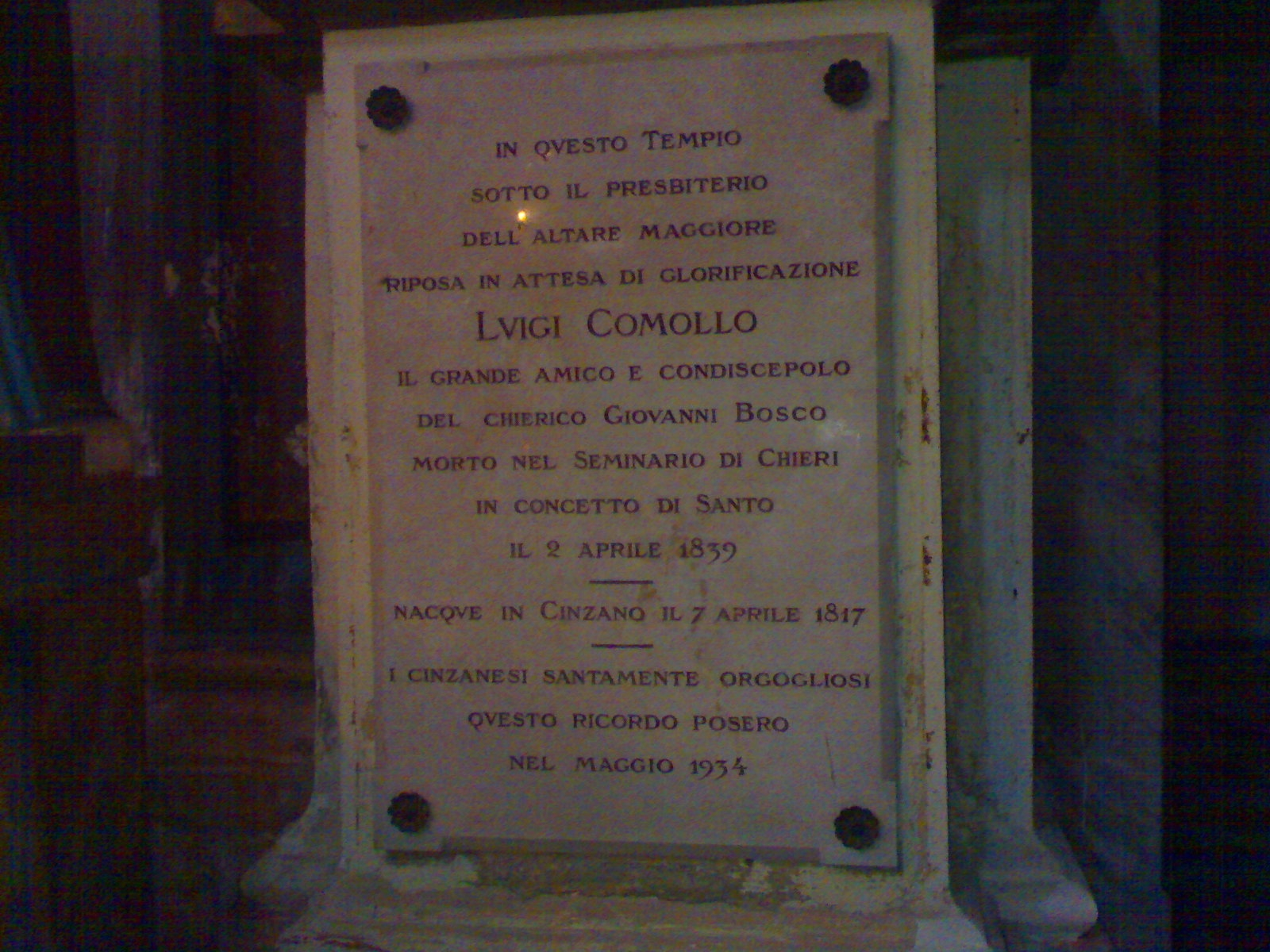
Luigi Comollo's tomb stone at the Church of Saint Philip in Chieri.

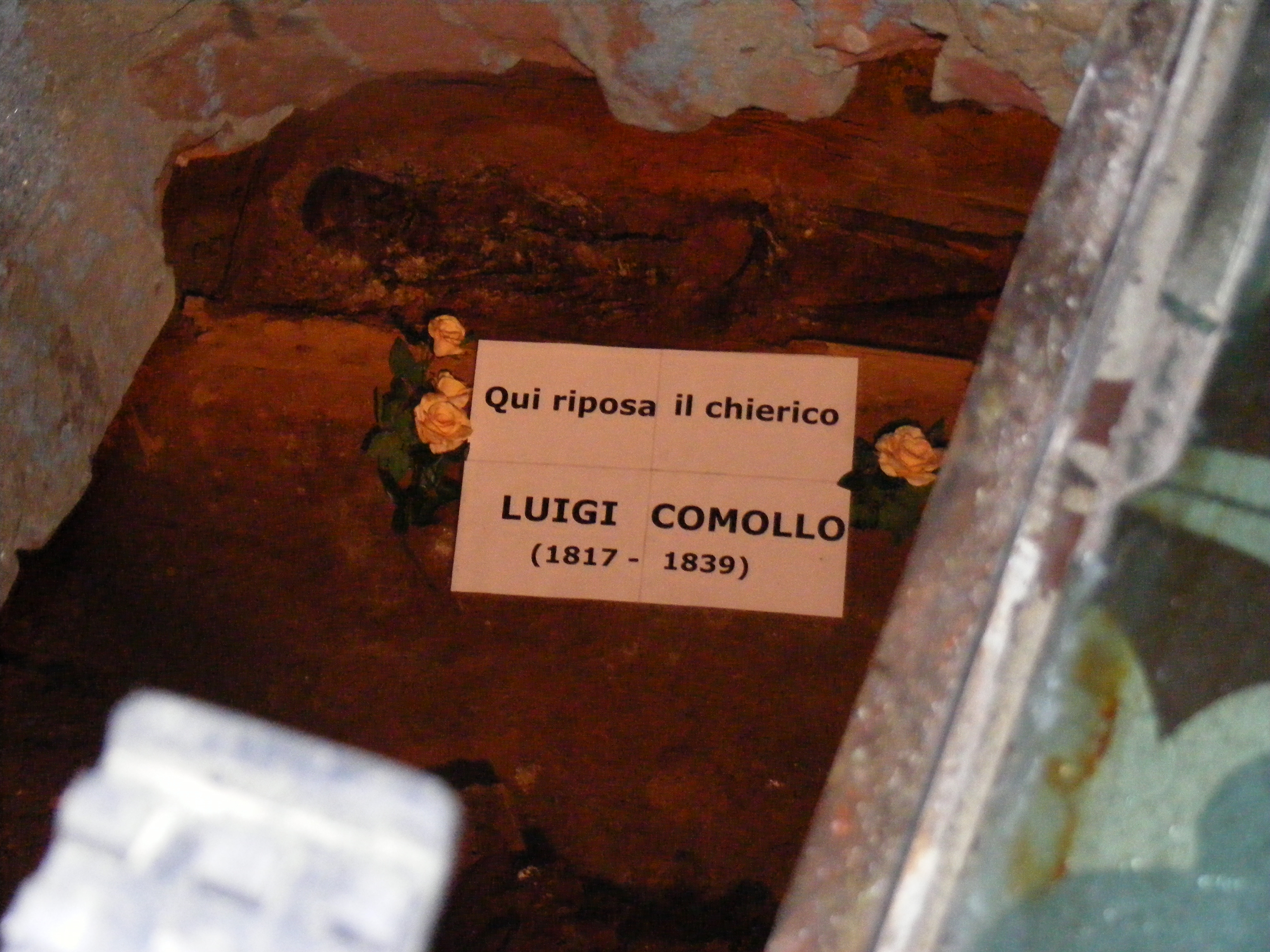
Luigi Comollo's tomb in the Church of Saint Philip in Chieri.

Luigi Comollo often anglicized as Louis Comollo (7 April 1817 – 2 April 1839) was a seminarian at the Seminary of Chieri of Archdiocese of Turin. He is well known for being an intimate friend of Saint John Bosco. One of the famous and first book of St. Bosco was the biography of Comollo.

== Early life ==
Born on 7 April 1817 in Pra, Cinzano, Italy, to Carlo and Gioanna Comollo. Comollo was a nephew of the Provost of Cinzano, Fr. Joseph Comollo. Comollo was often ill-treated by his classmates, but he never retaliated and always forgave them. Comollo’s actions made a great impression on John Bosco so much so that because of him Bosco took his spiritual life seriously. In his memoirs, Bosco recollects that Comollo taught him to "live as a Christian". In 1835 Comollo entered the Seminary of Chieri.

== Promise to Bosco ==
John Bosco and Luigi Comollo were close friends. One day after having read a long passage from the lives of the saints, they talked about death and the consolation that would arise from knowing the state of the deceased person. At the end of the conversation they both drew up this contract: "Whichever of us is the first to die will, if God permits it, bring back word of his salvation to his surviving companion". Bosco narrates that he entered the contract without realizing the gravity of such an undertaking; Nevertheless they ratified they contract repeatedly, especially during Comollo's last illness. According to Bosco, Comollo's last words and his last look at Bosco sealed his promise. Many of their companions knew about this contract.

== Death and apparition ==
According to Don Bosco's memoirs, Comollo predicted his death at least one year before its occurring. At 2:00 am in early morning of 2 April 1837 Luigi Comollo, who was often sick, fell ill and died at the age of 22. On the next evening he was buried in nearby Saint Philip’s Church.

That night, after Bosco went to bed in the dormitory which he shared with more than twenty other seminarians. Bosco says that he was convinced that this was to be the night when his promise would be fulfilled.

According to Bosco, about 11:30 a deep rumble was heard in the corridor. It sounded as if a heavy wagon drawn by many horses were coming up to the dormitory door. It got louder and louder, like thunder, and the whole dormitory shook. The seminarians tumbled out of bed in terror and huddled together for comfort. Then, above the violent and thundering noise, the voice of Comollo was heard clearly. Three times he repeated very distinctly: "Bosco, I am saved." All heard the noise; some recognized the voice without understanding the meaning; others understood it as well as Bosco did. Bosco records that it was the first time in his life he recollects being afraid. The fear and terror were so bad that Bosco fell ill to the point of death.

== After death ==
The Rector of the seminary managed to obtain a special permission from the Authorities, which enabled Luigi to be buried inside the Church of St. Philip, adjacent to the Seminary at Chieri, Turin. A gravestone in Cinzano was put in honor of Comollo and his remains rest under the Altar of the Church of the Seminary of Chieri.

His exemplary life won him private devotion amongst the seminarians. His tomb was desecrated by several of his companions who cut some fingers of his hand as relics. This hampered procedure to establish a cause of canonization in the Catholic Church.

The Comune of Chieri created a museum project to allow the visitor into the rooms of the former seminary where Comollo and Bosco studied.
