= Moriondo Torinese =

- Comune
- Comune di Moriondo Torinese
- Coat of arms

- Location within Italy Location within Piedmont
- Coordinates: 45°2′N 7°57′E
- Country: Italy
- Region: Piedmont
- Metropolitan city: Turin (TO)

Government
  - Mayor: Giuseppe Grande

Area
  - Total: 6.5 km^{2} (2.5 sq mi)
- Elevation: 328 m (1,076 ft)

Population (31 December 2010)
  - Total: 810
  - Density: 120/km^{2} (320/sq mi)
- Demonym: Moriondesi
- Time zone: UTC+1 (CET)
  - Summer (DST): UTC+2 (CEST)
- Postal code: 10020
- Dialing code: 011

Moriondo Torinese is a comune (municipality) in the Metropolitan City of Turin in the Italian region Piedmont, located about 20 kilometres (12 mi) east of Turin.

Moriondo Torinese borders the following municipalities: Moncucco Torinese, Castelnuovo Don Bosco, Mombello di Torino, Buttigliera d'Asti, and Riva presso Chieri.
