= Sciolze =

- Comune
- Comune di Sciolze
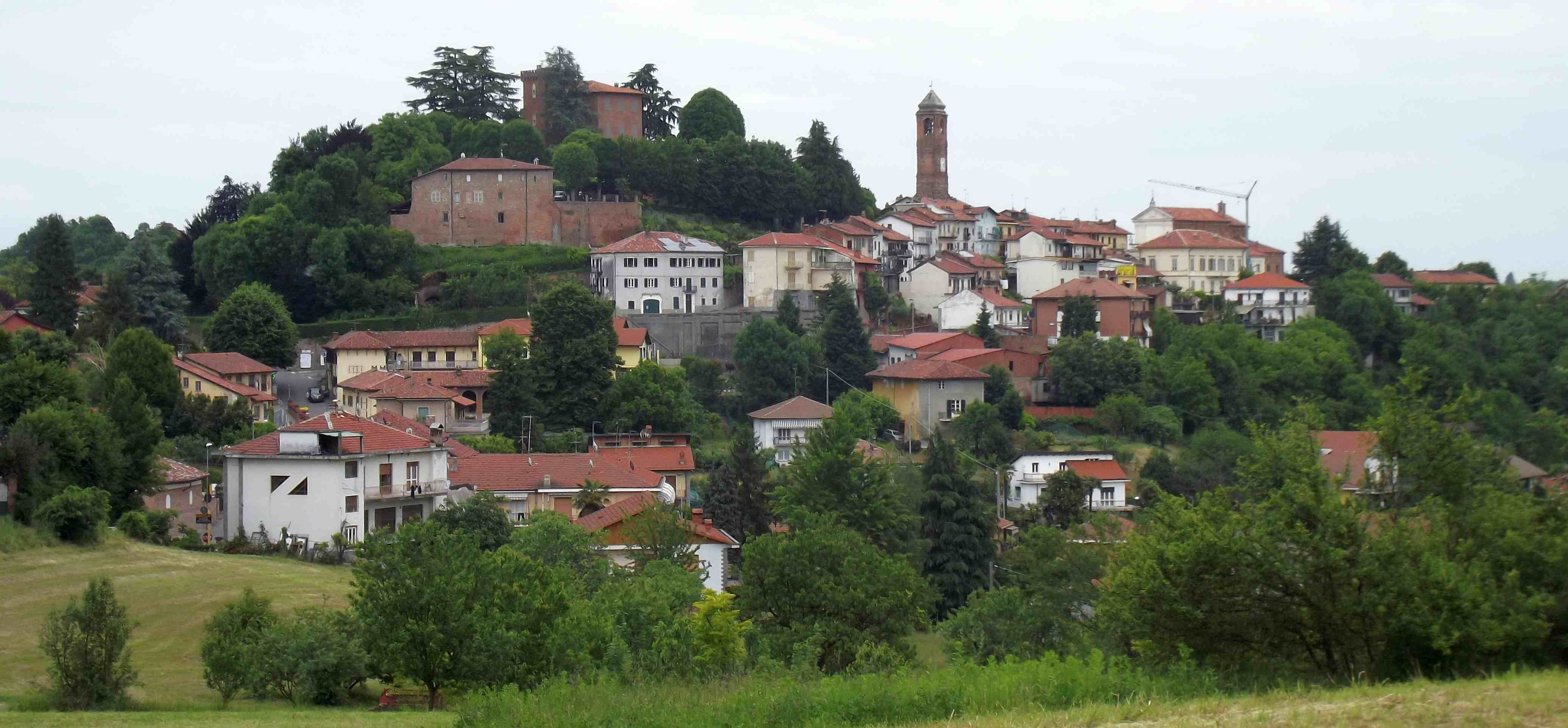

- Coat of arms

- Location within Italy Location within Piedmont
- Coordinates: 45°6′N 7°53′E
- Country: Italy
- Region: Piedmont
- Metropolitan city: Turin (TO)

Government
  - Mayor: Gabriella Mossetto

Area
  - Total: 11.3 km^{2} (4.4 sq mi)
- Elevation: 436 m (1,430 ft)

Population (31 November 2013)
  - Total: 1,466
  - Density: 130/km^{2} (336/sq mi)
- Demonym: Sciolzesi
- Time zone: UTC+1 (CET)
  - Summer (DST): UTC+2 (CEST)
- Postal code: 10090
- Dialing code: 011
- Patron saint: St. Roch
- Saint day: August 16
- Website: Official website

Sciolze is a comune (municipality) in the Metropolitan City of Turin in the Italian region Piedmont, located about 15 kilometres (9 mi) east of Turin.

Sciolze borders the following municipalities: Gassino Torinese, Rivalba, Cinzano, Marentino, Moncucco Torinese, and Montaldo Torinese.
