= Cinzano, Piedmont =

Cinzano
- Comune
- Comune di Cinzano
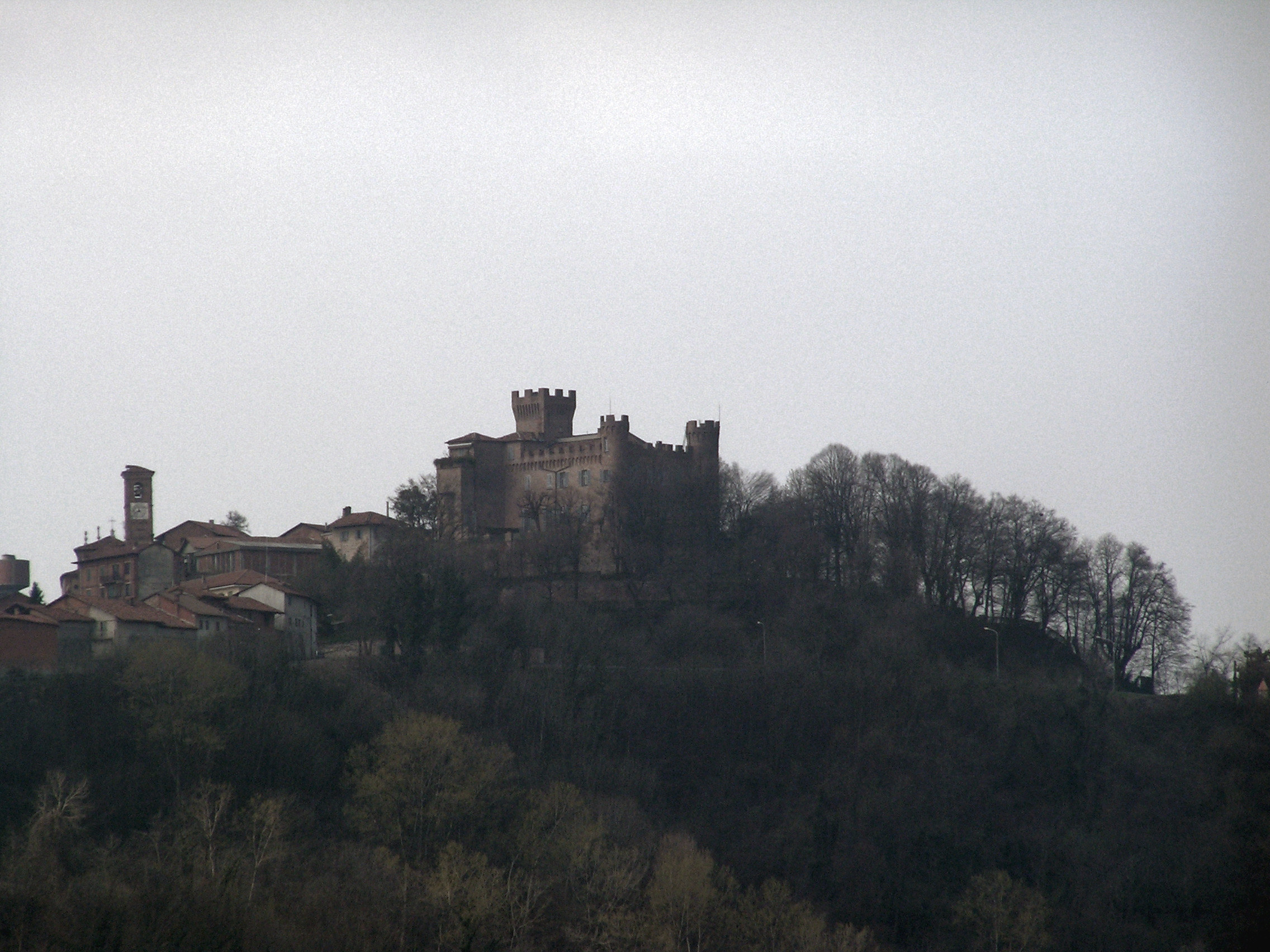
- Peyretti Castle.

- Coat of arms

- Location within Italy Location within Piedmont
- Coordinates: 45°6′N 7°55′E
- Country: Italy
- Region: Piedmont
- Metropolitan city: Turin (TO)

Government
  - Mayor: Delfino Casalegno

Area
  - Total: 6.2 km^{2} (2.4 sq mi)
- Elevation: 495 m (1,624 ft)

Population (31 December 2010)
  - Total: 389
  - Density: 63/km^{2} (160/sq mi)
- Demonym: Cinzanesi
- Time zone: UTC+1 (CET)
  - Summer (DST): UTC+2 (CEST)
- Postal code: 10090
- Dialing code: 011
- Patron saint: St. Roch
- Saint day: August 16

Cinzano is a comune (municipality) in the Metropolitan City of Turin in the Italian region Piedmont, located about 15 kilometres (9 mi) east of Turin.

Cinzano borders the following municipalities: Casalborgone, Rivalba, Sciolze, Berzano di San Pietro, and Moncucco Torinese.
