= Albugnano =

- Comune
- Comune di Albugnano
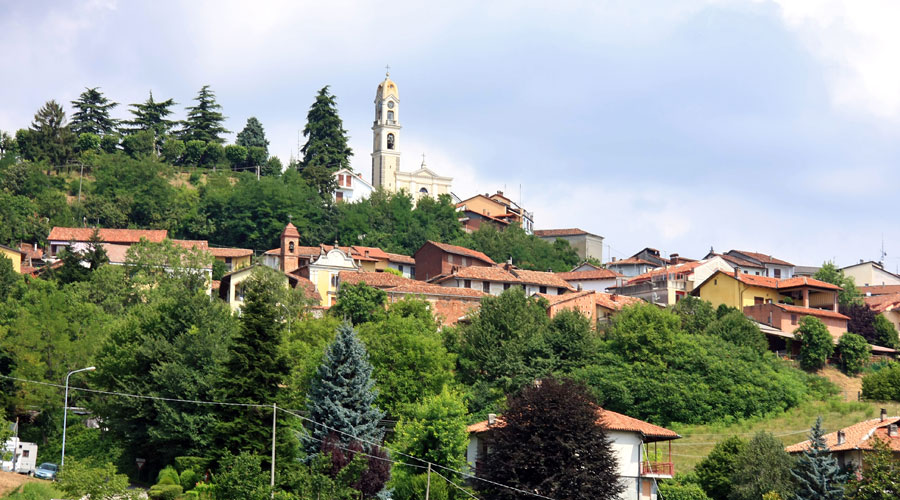
- View of Albugnano

- Coat of arms

- Location of Albugnano in Italy Albugnano (Piedmont)
- Coordinates: 45°5′N 7°58′E
- Country: Italy
- Region: Piedmont
- Province: Asti (AT)

Government
  - Mayor: Dario Peila

Area
  - Total: 9.5 km^{2} (3.7 sq mi)
- Elevation: 549 m (1,801 ft)

Population (31 December 2014)
  - Total: 541
  - Density: 57/km^{2} (150/sq mi)
- Demonym: Albugnanesi
- Time zone: UTC+1 (CET)
  - Summer (DST): UTC+2 (CEST)
- Postal code: 14020
- Dialing code: 011

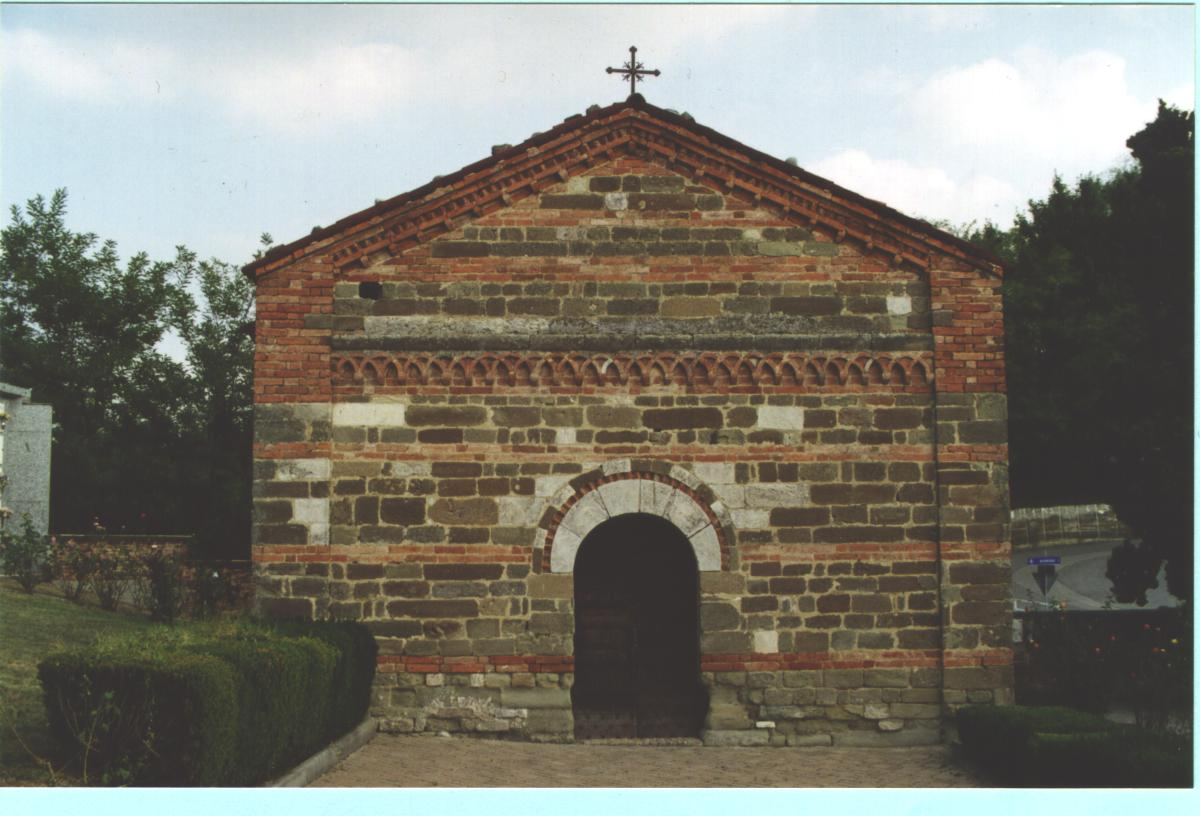
Facade of the St. Peter church.

Albugnano is a comune (municipality) in the Province of Asti in the Italian region Piedmont, located about 20 kilometres (12 mi) east of Turin and about 25 kilometres (16 mi) northwest of Asti.

Albugnano borders the following municipalities: Aramengo, Berzano di San Pietro, Castelnuovo Don Bosco, Moncucco Torinese, Passerano Marmorito, and Pino d'Asti.

== Main sights ==
- Parish church of San Giacomo Maggiore (15th century), with a 19th-century façade.
- Church of St. Peter (11th century)
- Tower belvedere, named after a medieval watch tower destroyed in 1401.

The Vezzolano Abbey is located nearby.
