= Berzano di San Pietro =

- Comune
- Comune di Berzano di San Pietro
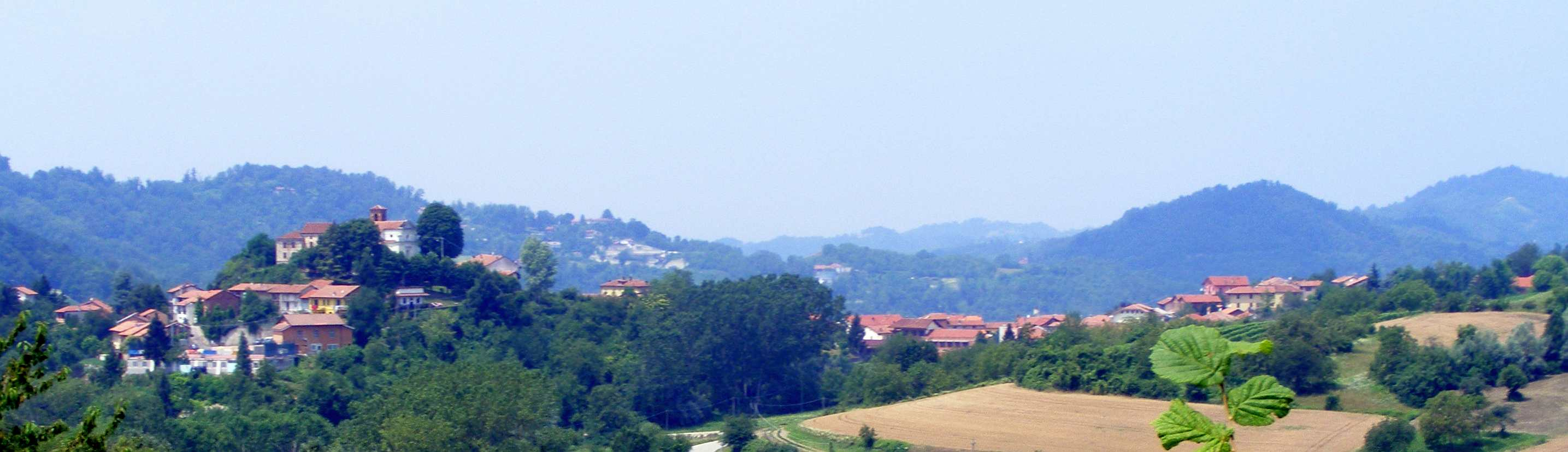
- View of Berzano di San Pietro

- Coat of arms

- Location within Italy Location within Piedmont
- Coordinates: 45°6′N 7°57′E
- Country: Italy
- Region: Piedmont
- Province: Asti (AT)
- Frazioni: Valle Gervaso, Valle Ochera

Government
  - Mayor: Mario Lupo

Area
  - Total: 7.4 km^{2} (2.9 sq mi)
- Elevation: 424 m (1,391 ft)

Population (31 December 2010)
  - Total: 454
  - Density: 61/km^{2} (160/sq mi)
- Demonym: Berzanesi
- Time zone: UTC+1 (CET)
  - Summer (DST): UTC+2 (CEST)
- Postal code: 14020
- Dialing code: 011

Berzano di San Pietro is a comune (municipality) in the Province of Asti in the Italian region Piedmont, located about 20 kilometres (12 mi) east of Turin and about 30 kilometres (19 mi) northwest of Asti.

Berzano di San Pietro borders the following municipalities: Albugnano, Aramengo, Casalborgone, Cinzano, and Moncucco Torinese.

== Twin towns ==
- Tașca, Romania
- Tetchea, Romania
- Glūda, Latvia
- Petritsi, Greece
- Kerkini, Greece
- Irakleia, Greece
