= Riva presso Chieri =

- Comune
- Comune di Riva presso Chieri
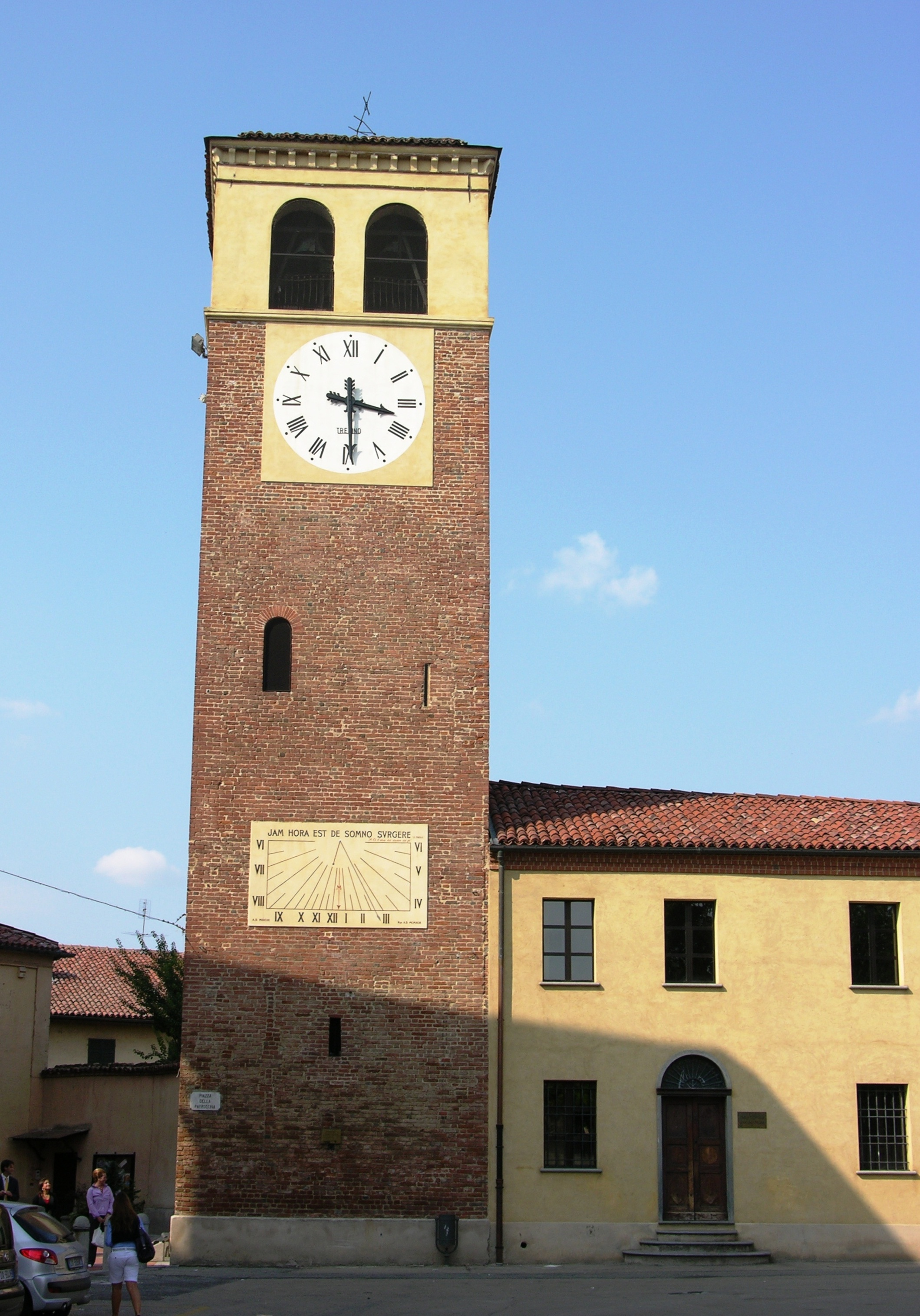

- Coat of arms

- Location within Italy Location within Piedmont
- Coordinates: 44°59′N 7°52′E
- Country: Italy
- Region: Piedmont
- Metropolitan city: Turin (TO)
- Frazioni: San Giovanni

Government
  - Mayor: Alex Maggio elected 2004-06-13

Area
  - Total: 35.8 km^{2} (13.8 sq mi)
- Elevation: 262 m (860 ft)

Population (31 August 2011)
  - Total: 4,239
  - Density: 118/km^{2} (307/sq mi)
- Demonym: Rivesi
- Time zone: UTC+1 (CET)
  - Summer (DST): UTC+2 (CEST)
- Postal code: 10020
- Dialing code: 011
- Patron saint: St. Albanus (one of the Theban Legion)
- Saint day: 22 September
- Website: Official website

Riva presso Chieri is a comune (municipality) in the Metropolitan City of Turin in the Italian region Piedmont, located about 15 kilometres (9 mi) southeast of Turin.

== People ==
- Saint Domenico Savio, canonized by Pope Pius XII in 1954.

== Sources ==
- "Riva Presso Chieri". Comuni-Italiani.it.
