= Arignano =

- Comune
- Comune di Arignano
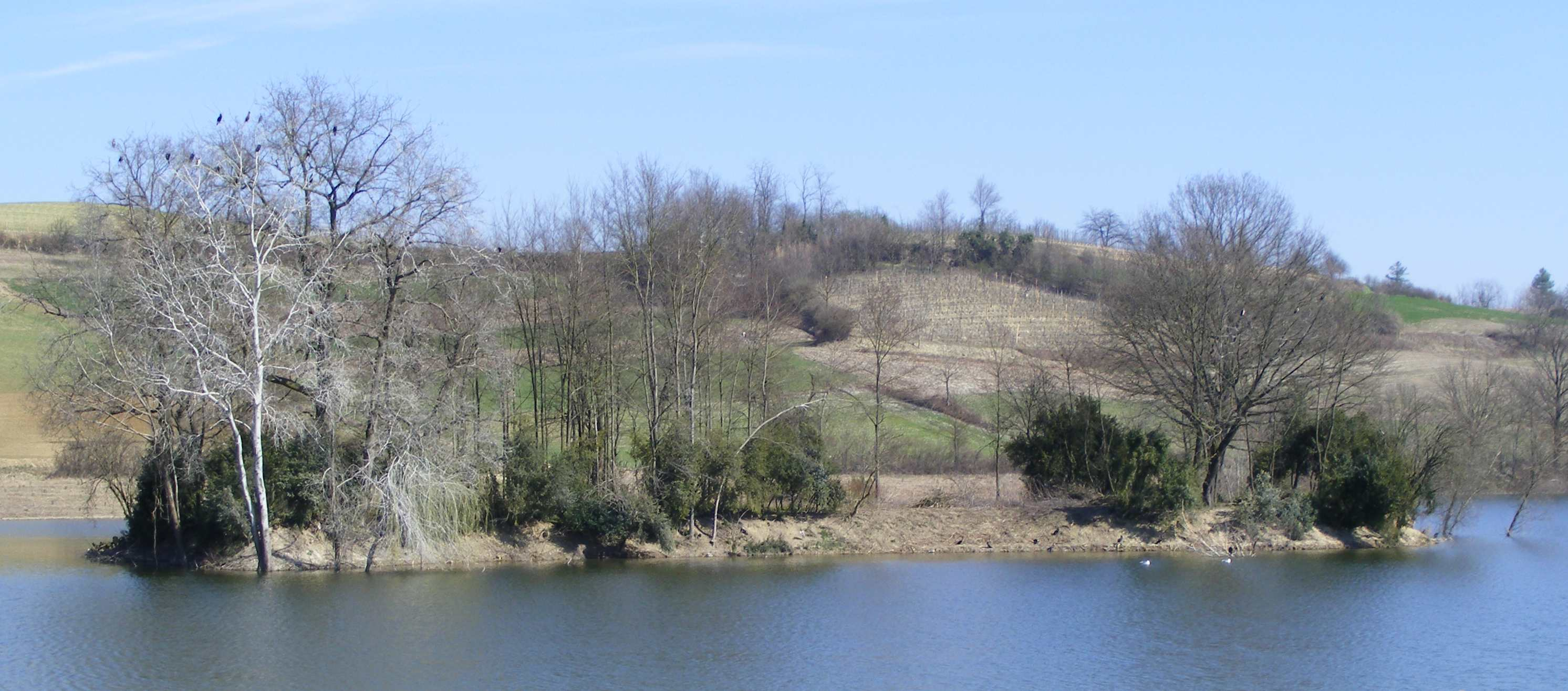

- Coat of arms

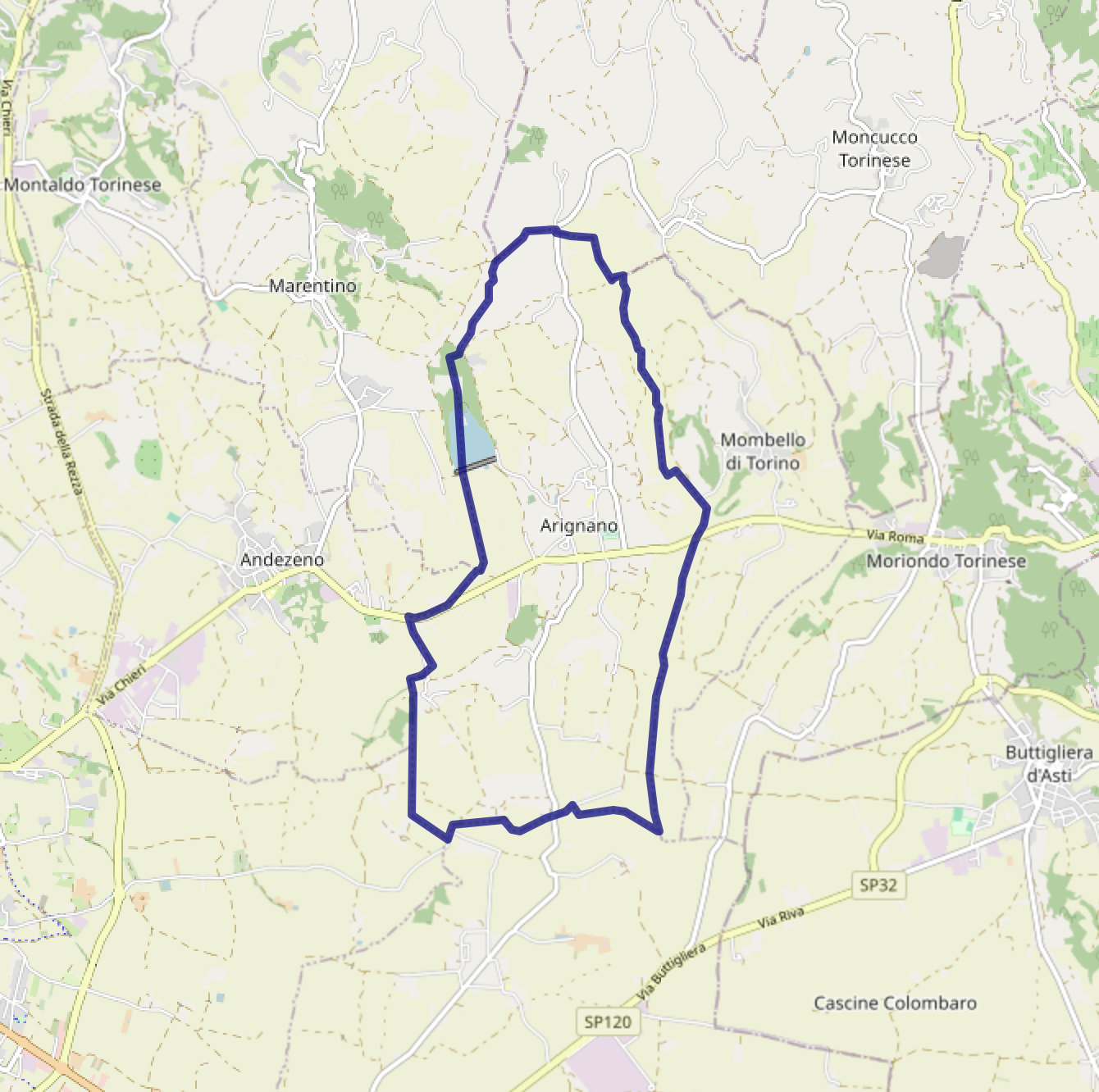

- Location of Arignano in Italy Arignano (Piedmont)
- Coordinates: 45°3′N 7°54′E
- Country: Italy
- Region: Piedmont
- Metropolitan city: Turin (TO)
- Frazioni: Moano, Oriassolo, Tetti Chiaffredo, Tetti Gianchino

Government
  - Mayor: Domenica Barisano

Area
  - Total: 8.17 km^{2} (3.15 sq mi)
- Elevation: 321 m (1,053 ft)

Population (1-1-2017)
  - Total: 1,067
  - Density: 131/km^{2} (338/sq mi)
- Demonym: Arignanese(i)
- Time zone: UTC+1 (CET)
  - Summer (DST): UTC+2 (CEST)
- Postal code: 10020
- Dialing code: 011
- Patron saint: Remigius of Reims
- Saint day: Third Sunday in September
- Website: Official website

Arignano (Piedmontese: Argnan) is a comune (municipality) in the Metropolitan City of Turin in the Italian region Piedmont, located about 15 kilometres (9 mi) east of Turin.

It is home to two castles, the Rocca (or Castello Superiore, known from 1047, and enlarged in the 15th century after its sack by Facino Cane's troops) and the Castello Inferiore (15th century).

Lake Arignano is located in the comune.

== Twin towns ==
- Comillas, Spain
