= Agnelli =

Agnelli (Italian: [aɲˈɲɛlli]) is an Italian surname literally meaning "lambs". Notable people with the surname include:

- Members of the Agnelli family, the industrial and business family of northern Italy, including:
  - Edoardo Agnelli (1831–1871), Italian entrepreneur and politician, father of Giovanni (1866–1945)
  - Aniceta Agnelli (1846–1920), born Aniceta Frisetti, wife of Edoardo Agnelli (1831–1871)
    - Giovanni Agnelli (1866–1945), Italian manufacturer and co-founder of Fiat S.p.A. in 1899 and the company's chief from 1900 to 1945
    - Clara Agnelli (1869–1946), born Clara Boselli, wife of Giovanni (1866–1945)
      - Edoardo Agnelli (1892–1935), Italian industrialist, son of Giovanni
      - Virginia Agnelli (1899–1945) born Donna Virginia Bourbon del Monte, Italian princess, wife of Edoardo (1892–1935)
        - Clara Agnelli (1920–2016), mother of Prince Egon von Fürstenberg and Princess Ira von Fürstenberg, eldest daughter of Edoardo (1892–1935)
        - Gianni Agnelli (1921–2003), the influential Italian industrialist and Fiat chairman from 1966 to 2003, eldest son of Edoardo (1892–1935)
        - Marella Agnelli (1927–2019), born Donna Marella Caracciolo di Castagneto, Italian princess and style icon, wife of Gianni
          - Edoardo Agnelli (1954–2000), named after grandfather, only son of Gianni
          - Margherita Agnelli (born 1955), only daughter of Gianni, married first to Alain Elkann but now to Count Sergei de Pahlen, by whom she had one son and four daughters (not listed). Her three children by Elkann are Fiat/Agnelli heirs, those by her second marriage are not.
            - John Elkann (born 1976), chosen heir to Fiat and the Agnelli dynasty, elder son of Margherita
            - Lapo Elkann (born 1977), Fiat executive and second son of Margherita
            - Ginevra Elkann (born 1979), eldest daughter of Margherita
        - Susanna Agnelli (1922–2009), Italian politician and first female Italian Minister of Foreign Affairs, second daughter of Edoardo (1892–1935)
        - Maria Sole Agnelli (1925–2025), third daughter of Edoardo (1892–1935)
        - Cristiana Agnelli (born 1927), wife of Count Brandolino Brandolini d'Adda, fourth daughter of Edoardo (1892–1935)
        - Giorgio Agnelli (1929–1965), second son of Edoardo (1892–1935)
        - Umberto Agnelli (1934–2004), Italian industrialist, politician, and Fiat chairman from 2003 to 2004, third son of Edoardo (1892–1935)
          - Giovanni Alberto Agnelli (1964–1997), CEO of Piaggio from 1992 to 1997, only son of Umberto by his first marriage
          - Andrea Agnelli (born 1975), Italian businessman and president of Juventus FC, only son of Umberto by his second marriage
- Chris Agnelli, Northern Irish dance music producer
- Cristian Agnelli, Italian football player
- Federico Agnelli (1626–1702), Italian engraver and printer
- Giuseppe Agnelli (1621–1706), Italian Catholic author
- Guglielmo Agnelli (c. 1238-1313), Italian sculptor and artist
- Roger Agnelli (1959–2016), Brazilian entrepreneur, banker, and corporate leader
- Salvatore Agnelli (1817–1874), Italian composer

== See also ==
- Agnello
- Agnelli & Nelson
