= Giovanni Agnelli (entrepreneur, born 1866) =

Italian businessman (1866–1945)

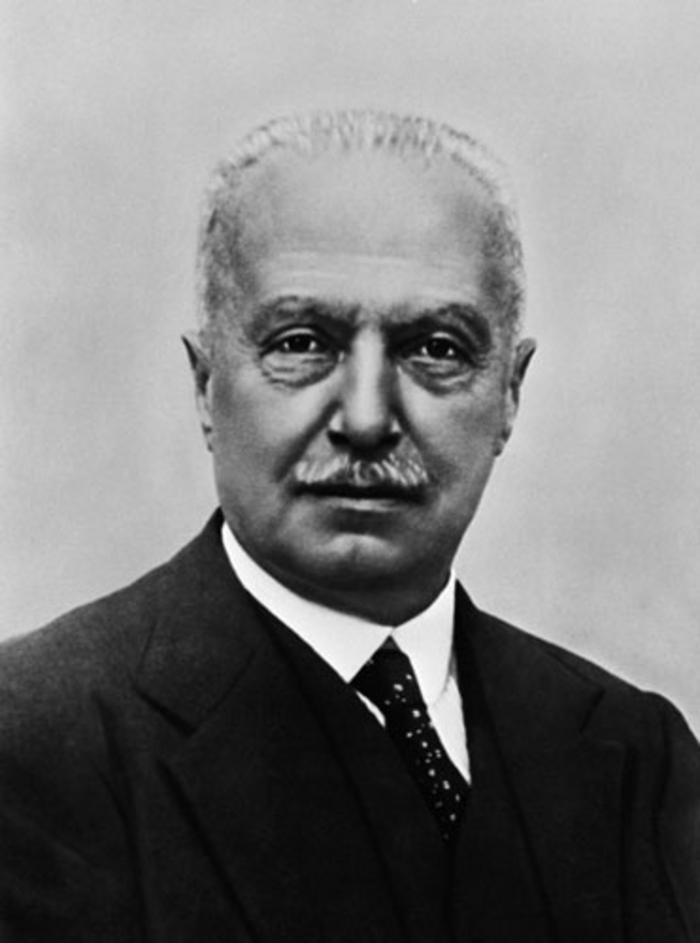
- Agnelli c. 1945

Member of the Senate of the Kingdom
- In office 29 May 1923 – 7 August 1944
- Appointed by: Victor Emmanuel III

Personal details
- Born: 13 August 1866 Villar Perosa, Italy
- Died: 16 December 1945 (aged 79) Turin, Italy
- Party: National Fascist Party
- Spouse: Clara Boselli
- Children: 2, including Edoardo
- Parent(s): Edoardo Agnelli; Aniceta Frisetti
- Relatives: Gianni Agnelli (grandson); Susanna Agnelli (granddaughter); Giorgio Agnelli (grandson); Umberto Agnelli (grandson); Andrea Agnelli (great-grandson); John Elkann (great-great-grandson)
- Education: Honorary degree in industrial engineering
- Occupation: Businessman, politician
- Known for: Co-founder of Fiat S.p.A.

Giovanni Agnelli (13 August 1866 – 16 December 1945) was an Italian industrialist and principal founder of Fiat S.p.A., established in 1899. Under his leadership, Fiat became a cornerstone of Italy's automotive industry, significantly contributing to the country's industrialization during the early 20th century. Agnelli also served as a Senator from 1923 to 1944.

== Early life ==
The son of Edoardo Agnelli and Aniceta Frisetti, a landowning family who grew up in families rooted in the business, entrepreneurial, and financial environment of Turin on the eve of its industrialization, he was born in 1866 in Villar Perosa, a small town near Pinerolo in Piedmont, which is still the main home and burial place of the Agnelli family. His father, the mayor of Villar Perosa, died at age 40, when Agnelli was five. He studied at the Collegio San Giuseppe in Turin and then embarked on a military career.

In 1893, Agnelli returned to Villar Perosa, where he followed in his father's footsteps and became mayor in 1895, a post that he held until his death in 1945; he was succeeded by his grandson, Gianni Agnelli, whom he took care of since his son, Edoardo Agnelli, died in a plane accident in 1935.

During the late 19th century, Agnelli heard about the invention of the then-new horseless carriage and immediately saw an opportunity for using his engineering and entrepreneurial skills. In 1898, he met Count Emanuele Cacherano di Bricherasio, who was looking for investors for his horseless carriage project. Agnelli sensed the opportunity, and Fiat was founded in 1899.

He married Clara Boselli, and they had two children – Aniceta Caterina (1889–1928) and Edoardo (1892–1935). As of 2000, from Agnelli and Boselli came over seventy descendants between children, nephews, and spouses.

== Career ==
On 11 July 1899, Agnelli was part of the group of founding members of Fiat S.p.A., an acronym for Fabbrica Italiana di Automobili Torino, which became Fiat; he paid $400 for his share. One year later, he was the managing director of the new company and became the chairman in 1920. The first Fiat plant opened in 1900 with 35 staff making 24 cars. The company was known from the beginning for the talent and creativity of its engineering staff. By 1903, Fiat made a small profit and produced 135 cars growing to 1,149 cars by 1906. The company then went public selling shares via the Milan stock exchange. Agnelli began purchasing all the shares he could to add to his holdings. During this time, he overcame scandals and labour problems, such as in the Biennio Rosso. He asked Giovanni Giolitti to intervene militarily to clear up Fiat's factories; Giolitti refused. When the revolt died down and a workers' delegation, after a failed attempt at self-management, handed him the keys to the factories by demobilizing the armed pickets, he did not seek retaliation. He offered a new contract to workers with wages linked to productivity in a period of economic stagnation.

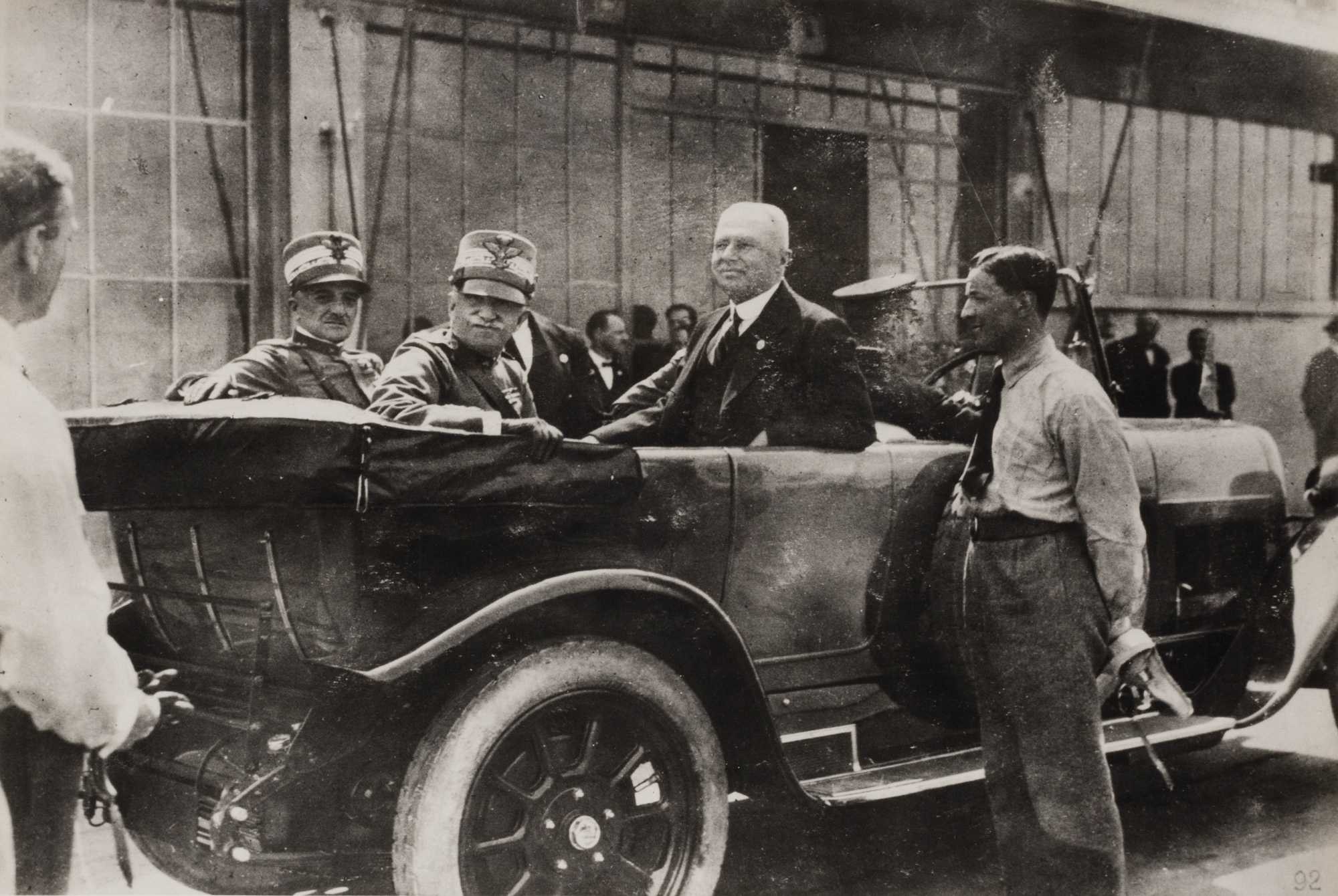
Agnelli with King Victor Emmanuel III in a limousine at the Fiat Lingotto factory in 1923

During World War I, Agnelli became involved with the financier Riccardo Gualino in the transport of United States aid to Europe in 1917. They invested in two enterprises in the United States; the Marine & Commerce Corporation of America exported coal and the International Shipbuilding Company made motorized vessels. These companies failed when the war ended since they were structured to meet wartime demand but had returned large profits to their owners. In early 1918, Agnelli and Gualino made an attempt to take over Credito Italiano. They did not succeed but joined the board of directors of the bank. Agnelli was vice-president of Gualino's SNIA S.p.A. from 1917 to 1926. In the early 1920s, SNIA began to manufacture artificial textile fibres. Suffering from debt, Agnelli offered to help Gualino in exchange for Fiat shares, and by 1927 he became the major shareholder of Fiat.

In 1920, Gualino and Agnelli participated in recapitalization of the private bank Jean de Fernex and bought a third of the shares of Alfredo Frassati, publisher of La Stampa. Gualino and Agnelli were also involved in a proposal to link Milan, Genoa, and Turin with a high-speed railway and in various projects in cement and automobiles. Their partnership broke up around 1926 due to Gualino's investments in the French automobile industry.

After World War I, Fiat jumped from 30th to third place among Italian industrial companies. The first Ford Motor Company factory was opened four years after Fiat was founded. In 1906, the first Fiat car dealer in the United States was established at a location in Manhattan on Broadway. A monarchist, Agnelli sought to create a non-ideological, centrist political formation of Atlanticist and pro-European persuasion that sought modernizing, internationalist capitalism in contrast to the left and opposed to the populist, nationalist, or fascist right. He was a supporter of Giolitti. Before joining the National List of 1924, he was tempted by the Economic Party for the 1919 Italian general election. He filled several prestigious positions between the two wars and remained focused and propelled Fiat to the international arena.

== Agnelli and fascism ==
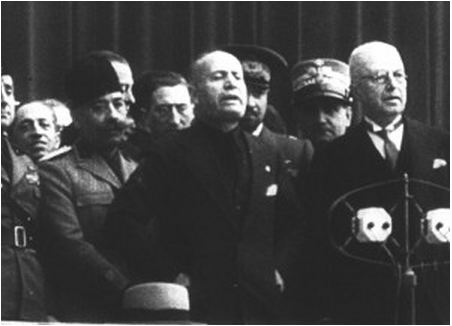
Mussolini giving a speech in Turin with Agnelli in 1923

An acquaintance of Benito Mussolini since 1914, Agnelli was appointed in 1923 by Mussolini as a senator for the National Fascist Party. His newspaper La Stampa distanced themselves from Mussolini; thanks to his connections with the House of Savoy, he could assert autonomy from the Italian fascist regime. As an example, he appointed Curzio Malaparte, who was disliked by Mussolini, as director of La Stampa, and took on as private tutor of his grandson the liberal anti-fascist Franco Antonicelli, and allowed his nephews to attend as their tutor the anti-fascist Augusto Monti, and another anti-fascist, Massimo Mila, as their musicologist. In addition, he sought as accountant Vittorio Valletta, who was known to the Fascist regime for his social democratic ideas, membership in Freemasonry, and clandestine connections with exiled anti-fascists in France, including Giuseppe Saragat. Mussolini described Agnelli as too old to be fascist, and he was suspected by the regime of helping the anti-fascist movement Giustizia e Libertà in the 1930s.

In 1927, Mussolini felt compelled to warn his superiors, in the words of historian Valerio Castronovo, of "the serious and absurd danger that Fiat ended up considering itself as an intangible and sacred institution of the State, on a par with the Dynasty, the Church, the Regime..." Mussolini was able to impose the Fascio card on Agnelli from 1932, when he wore the cimice all'occhiello. The Fascist secret police kept Angelli under control, and one report stood up in reference to a meeting between Agnelli and Cesare Pavese, who introduced Mila to him. When telling him that he was an anti-fascist, Agnelli was reported to have said: "Better yet..." Agnelli also unsuccessfully tried to help Monti when he was arrested; once he was released from prison, he found a note from Agnelli that complimented him for having been a real man and a true Piedmontese. In the words of Castronovo, Agnelli's Piedmontism "combined the Savoyard tradition, the sense of almost military discipline, and the spirit of conquest: he had been educated in the manner of the Piedmontese nobility, that same elite that initially had struggled to welcome him, dismissing him as a provincial. His Piedmontism, moreover, was innervated by Americanism and a strong utopian vocation."

Asked whether Agnelli could be considered an anti-fascist, Castronovo said: "No, for him fascism still remained the regime that guaranteed 'effective labour discipline' and with which it was necessary — bon gré, mal gré — to coexist in the interests of one's industry. On the other hand, although the Fascist government continued to have an eye for Fiat, Agnelli had remained substantially extraneous to the trafficking of the great fascist bosses." In reference to Agnelli's defence of the press, Marziano Bernardi was more than once called on the phone by Malaparte, who once told him: "I'm stunned! Colli [the newspaper's administrator] and Senator Agnelli behave like anti-fascists and I think they are..." Castronovo maintains that the defence of Fiat's autonomy from Fascist interference produced a sort of conflictual solidarity between Agnelli and the Fiat workers, and said: "Perhaps solidarity is a bit of a strong word. But it is certain that Agnelli's afascism and the opposition of the workers prevented fascism from taking firm roots in the Piedmontese capital. So much so that Mussolini unleashed the famous invective against the dirty city of Turin."

== Later life and death ==
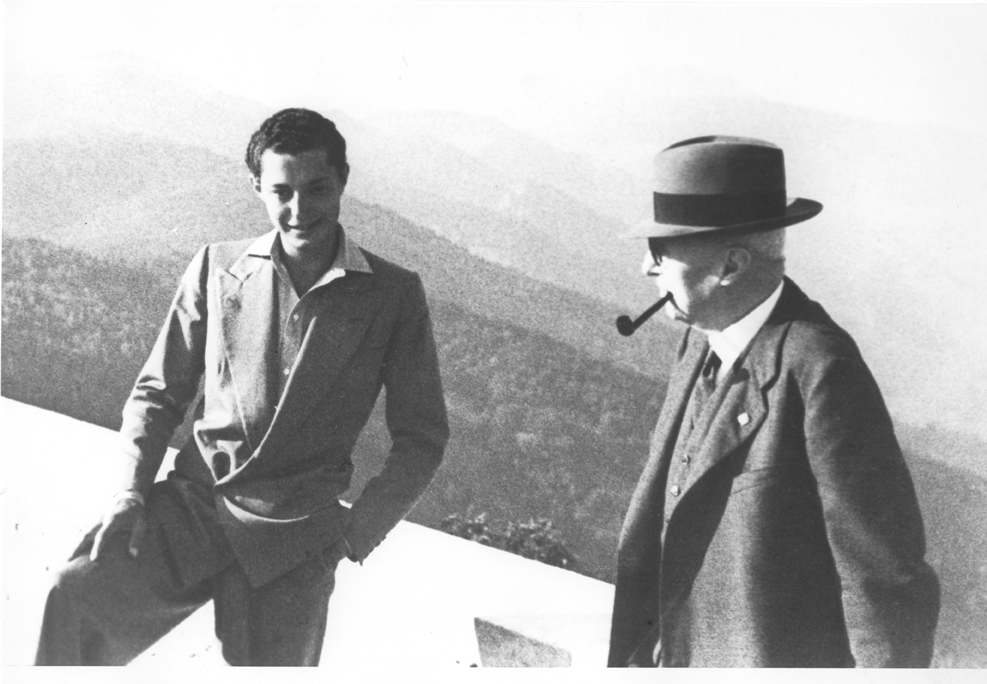
Agnelli with his grandson in 1940

Agnelli was still active with Fiat at the start of World War II. After the war ended, he was accused together with Valletta and Giancarlo Camerana by a commission from the National Liberation Committee of collaboration with the Fascist regime and was temporarily deprived of ownership of his companies. While they shared mutual benefits in the field of war orders, Fiat always maintained a line of independence from the Fascist regime's totalitarian aspirations. In his work about the Italian resistance, Sergio Favretto's book argues that Fiat was actively involved alongside the resistance; the company supplied vehicles and petrol, made large sums available to support the movement, and collaborated in the sabotage of war production in its own plants. Agnelli was later acquitted, and he died soon after on 16 December 1945 at age 79.

== Honours ==
- Knight Grand Cross of the Order of the Crown of Italy (15 December 1932; Grand Officer: 1 February 1920; Knight: 8 December 1898)
- Knight of the Order of Labour (30 May 1907)
- Grand Officer of the Order of Saints Maurice and Lazarus (6 February 1921)
- Inducted into the European Automotive Hall of Fame in 2001.
- Inducted into the Automotive Hall of Fame in 2002.

== See also ==
- Ceirano GB & C
