= San Germano Chisone =

- Comune
- Comune di San Germano Chisone
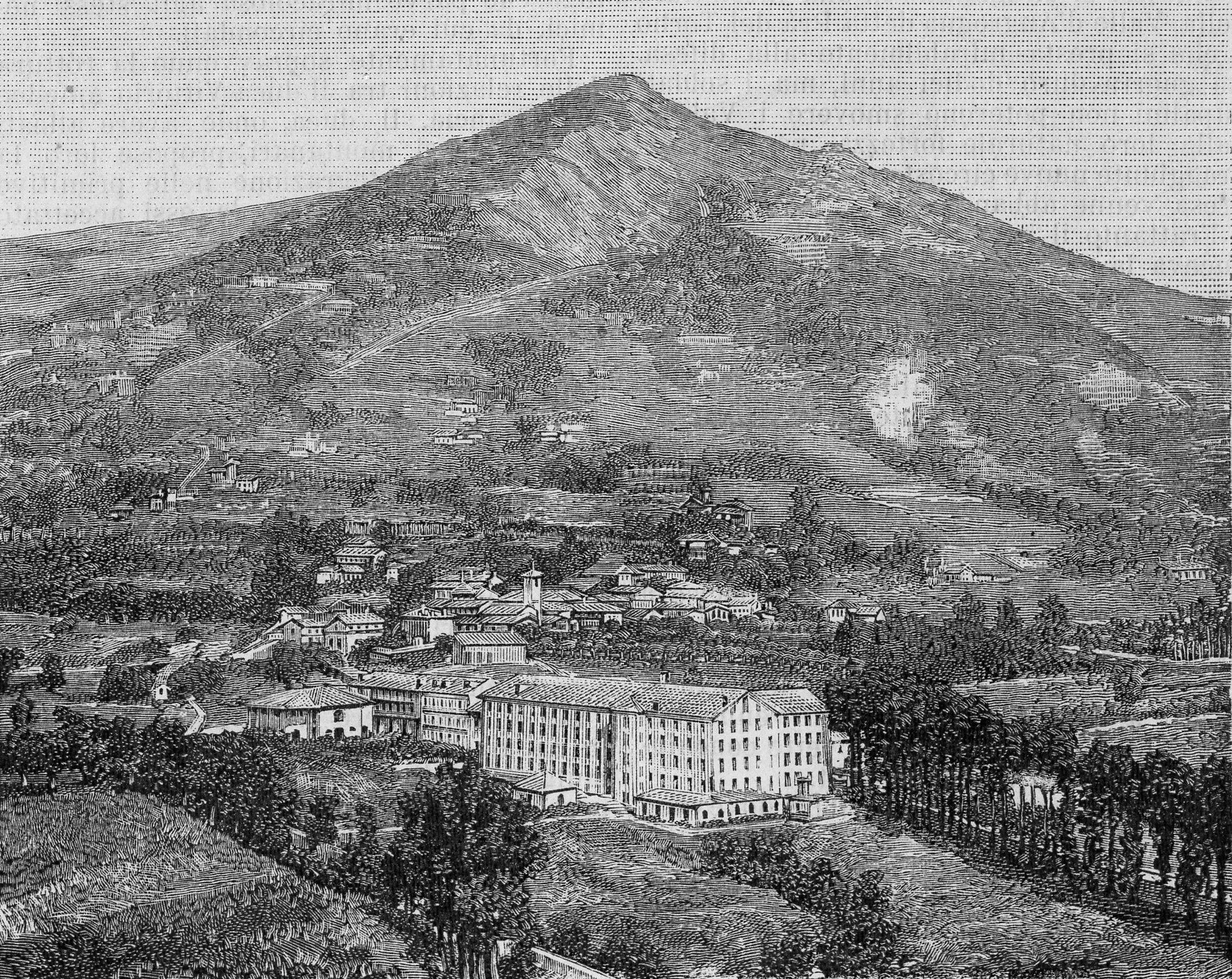

- Location within Italy Location within Piedmont
- Coordinates: 44°54′N 7°14′E
- Country: Italy
- Region: Piedmont
- Metropolitan city: Turin (TO)

Government
  - Mayor: Flavio Reynaud

Area
  - Total: 15.9 km^{2} (6.1 sq mi)
- Elevation: 488 m (1,601 ft)

Population (31 December 2010)
  - Total: 1,878
  - Density: 118/km^{2} (306/sq mi)
- Demonym: Sangermanesi
- Time zone: UTC+1 (CET)
  - Summer (DST): UTC+2 (CEST)
- Postal code: 10065
- Dialing code: 0121

San Germano Chisone (French: Saint-Germain; Occitan: Sant Germà) is a comune (municipality) in the Metropolitan City of Turin in the Italian region Piedmont, located about 40 kilometres (25 mi) southwest of Turin. San Germano Chisone borders the following municipalities: Inverso Pinasca, Villar Perosa, Pramollo, Porte, Angrogna, San Secondo di Pinerolo, and Prarostino.
