= Osasco (disambiguation) =

Osasco may refer to:

== Places ==
- Osasco, a city in São Paulo state, Brazil
- Osasco, Piedmont, a commune in the province of Turin, Italy

== Football clubs ==
- Esporte Clube Osasco, a Brazilian football (soccer) club
- Grêmio Esportivo Osasco, a Brazilian football (soccer) club
- Osasco Futebol Clube, a Brazilian football (soccer) club

== Volleyball clubs ==
- Osasco Voleibol Clube, a Brazilian volleyball club

== Other ==
- Osasco (CPTM), a train station in the city of Osasco
