= San Secondo di Pinerolo =

- Comune
- Comune di San Secondo di Pinerolo
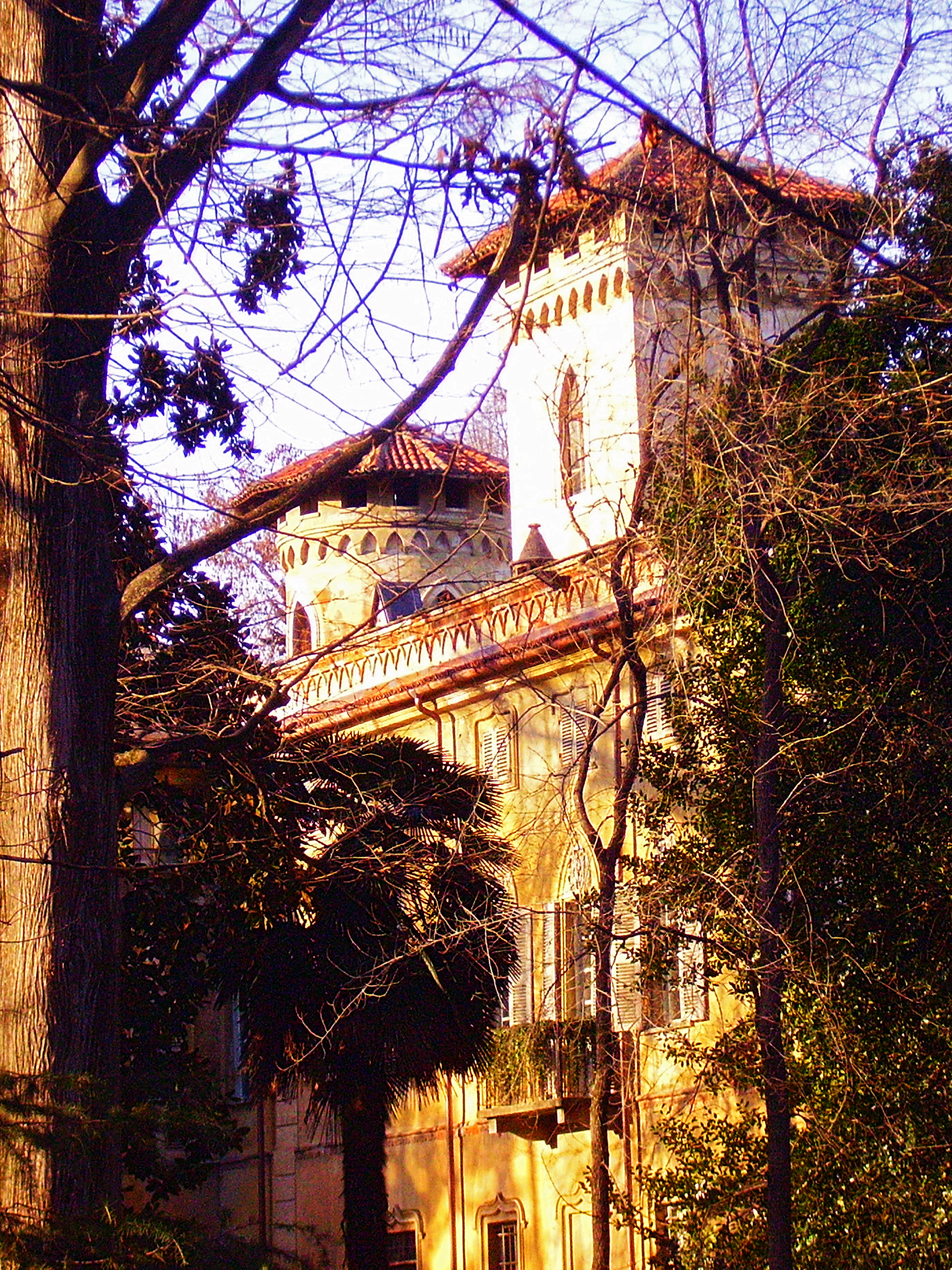
- Castle of Miradolo.

- Coat of arms

- Location within Italy Location within Piedmont
- Coordinates: 44°52′N 7°18′E
- Country: Italy
- Region: Piedmont
- Metropolitan city: Turin (TO)
- Frazioni: Miradolo

Government
  - Mayor: Adriana Sadone

Area
  - Total: 12.6 km^{2} (4.9 sq mi)
- Elevation: 413 m (1,355 ft)

Population (31 December 2010)
  - Total: 3,615
  - Density: 287/km^{2} (743/sq mi)
- Demonym: Sansecondesi
- Time zone: UTC+1 (CET)
  - Summer (DST): UTC+2 (CEST)
- Postal code: 10060
- Dialing code: 0121
- Website: Official website

San Secondo di Pinerolo (Piedmontese: San Second; Occitan: Seisound, French: Saint-Second-de-Pignerol) is a comune (municipality) in the Metropolitan City of Turin in the Italian region Piedmont, located about 40 kilometres (25 mi) southwest of Turin.

San Secondo di Pinerolo borders the following municipalities: Pinerolo, San Germano Chisone, Porte, Prarostino, Osasco, and Bricherasio. The main sight is the Castle of Miradolo, a neo-Gothic villa near the Chisone stream.

== Twin towns ==
- Carlos Pellegrini, Argentina
