= Miklos Tassilo Csillaghy =

21st-century Italian equestrian

- Born: Miklós Tassilo Csillaghy Freiherr de Pacsér; 1992 (age 32–33)
- Father: Baron Alexandre Csillaghy de Pacsér
- Mother: Virginia von Fürstenberg
- Occupation: Equestrian

Baron Miklós Tassilo Csillaghy de Pacsér von Fürstenberg (born 1992) is an Italian equestrian who has competed for Italy and Austria.

== Early life and family ==
Csillaghy is the eldest child of the late Virginia von Fürstenberg and Alexandre Csillaghy de Pacsér. His mother was a member of the Swabian Princely family of Fürstenberg and his father is a member of a Hungarian noble family. He descends maternally from the Agnelli family. Clara Agnelli was his great-grandmother. He is a grandnephew of actress Princess Ira von Fürstenberg and fashion designer Prince Egon von Fürstenberg, the ex-husband of Diane von Fürstenberg. He is the older brother of Ginevra Csillaghy de Pacsér von Fürstenberg.

== Career ==
Csillaghy trained under Italian Olympic equestrian Vincenzo Chimirri and competed for Italy as a pony rider in multiple Nations Cup competitions. He placed sixteenth in 2007 at the European Pony Championships in Freudenberg, Germany. He competed again in 2008 in Avenches, Switzerland. He won silver and gold medals at the Italian Pony Championships and a silver medal as a junior competitor. In 2010 he competed for Austria, winning a bronze medal, at the Nations Cup in Hagen, Germany. He competed again for Austria in Jardy, France at the 2010 European Championships.
