= Dell'Agnello =

Dell'Agnello is an Italian surname. Notable people with the surname include:

- Sandro Dell'Agnello (born 1961), Italian former professional basketball player, and current basketball coach
- Simone Dell'Agnello (born 1992), Italian footballer

== See also ==
- Agnello
