= Agnelli family =

Italian industrial family founded by Giovanni Agnelli (1866–1945)

- Business family
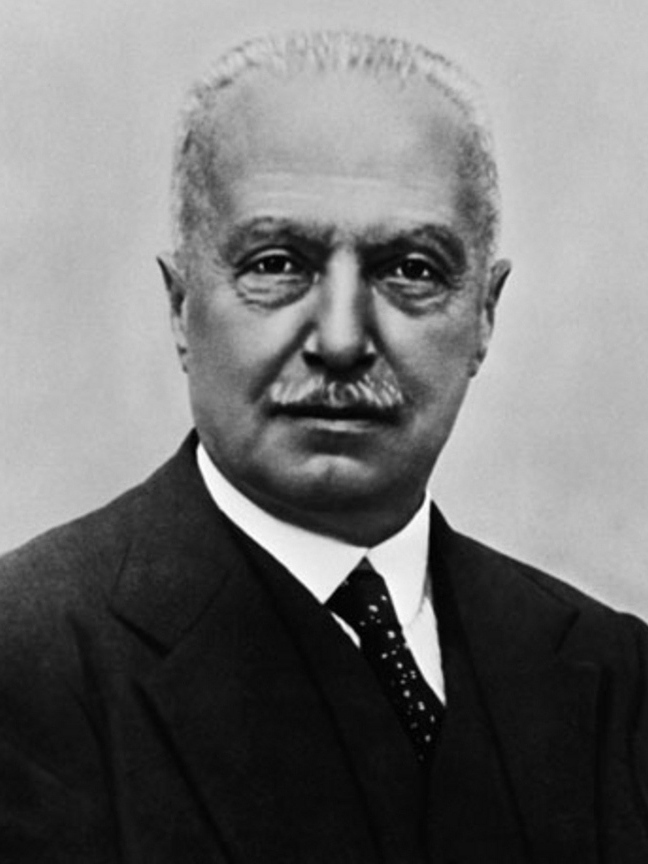
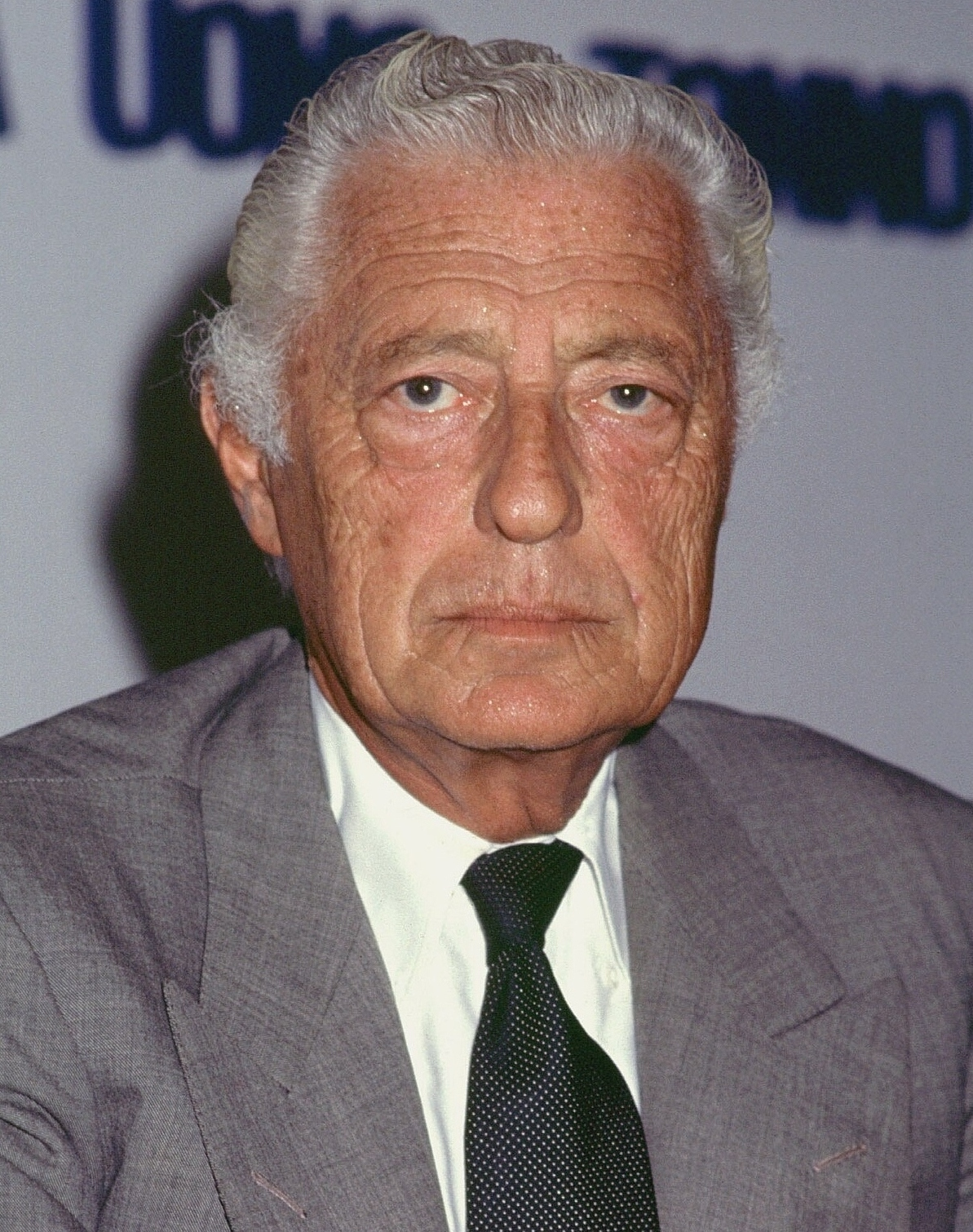
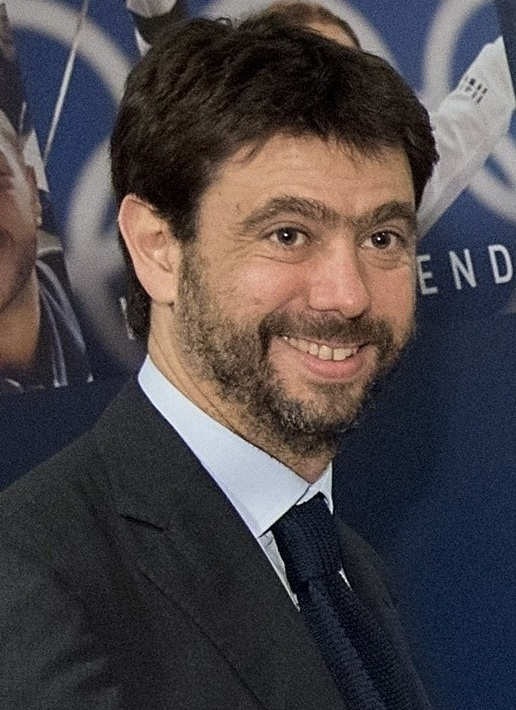
- Giovanni Agnelli Gianni Agnelli Andrea Agnelli
- Current region: Italy; United States
- Origin: Turin, Piedmont, Italy
- Founded: Marriage of Edoardo Agnelli 1865, Turin; 161 years ago
- Founder: Edoardo Agnelli
- Current head: John Elkann
- Connected families: Frisetti; Boselli; Nasi; Fürstenberg; Caracciolo; Elkann; Borromeo
- Heirlooms: Fiat

The Agnelli family (Italian pronunciation: [aɲˈɲɛlli]) is an Italian multi-industry business dynasty. The family's fortune traces its roots to Giovanni Agnelli who launched Fiat, Italy's largest automobile manufacturer.

In addition to its longtime association with Fiat, the Agnelli family is famous for its ownership of other popular automotive brands including Ferrari (1969), Lancia (1969), and Alfa Romeo (1986). As of 2009, the family added Chrysler to its vast network of auto manufacturers after the original company filed for bankruptcy. Moreover, since 1923, the Agnellis have been majority owners of the co-national Serie A football club, Juventus FC. as well as being the first shareholders of Sisport. Most members of the family are stakeholders in privately owned Giovanni Agnelli BV, which in turn has a controlling stake in the publicly listed holding company Exor.

The family has sometimes been described in American media as "the Kennedys of Italy" for their role in the country's contemporary history and their activity of patronage in modern art and in sports. As of 2020, the extended Agnelli family comprised about two hundred members.

== Family tree ==
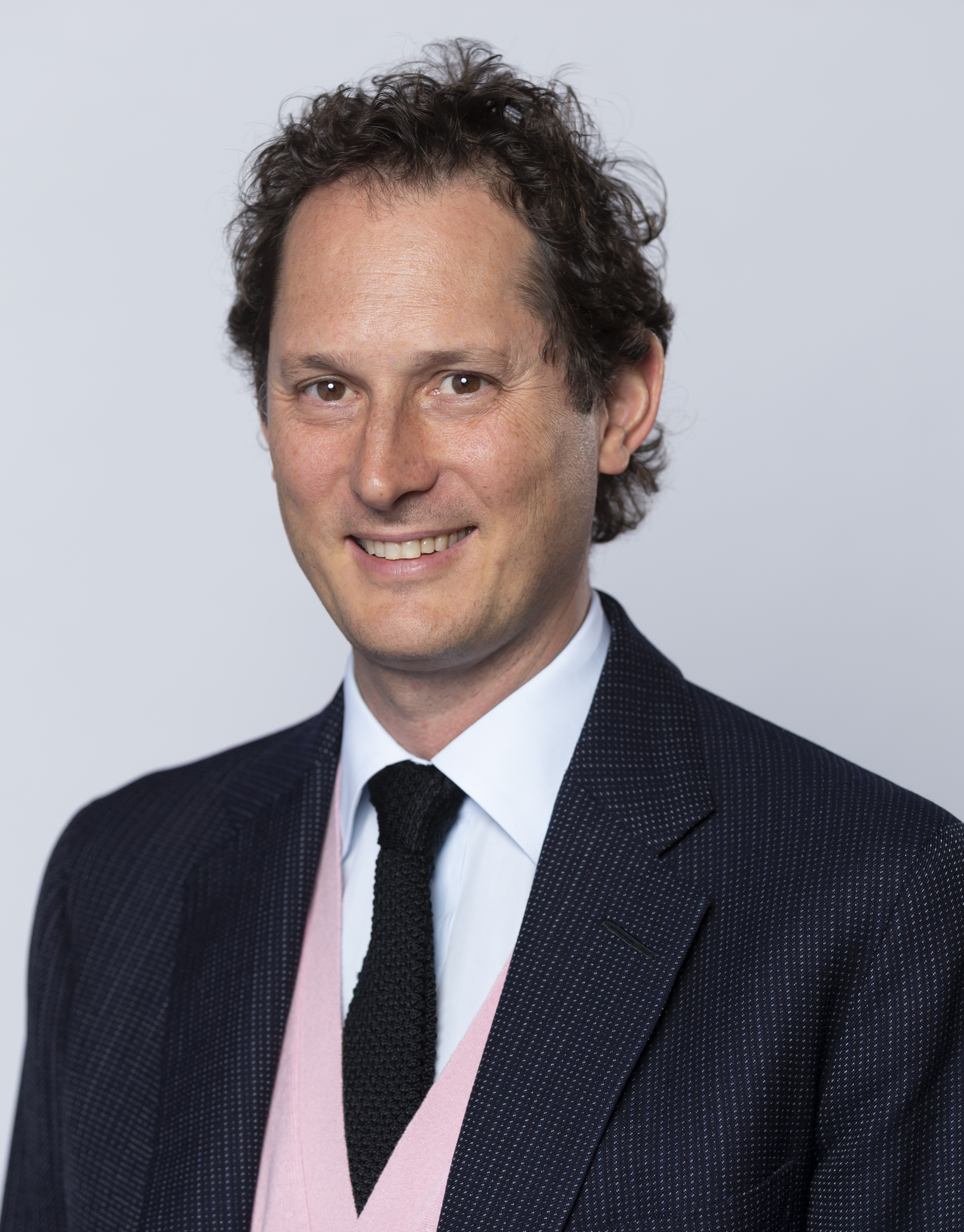
John Elkann, CEO of Exor NV and current head of the Agnelli family.

- Edoardo Agnelli (1831–1871) married Aniceta Frisetti (1846–1920)
  - Giovanni Agnelli (1866–1945) (founder of Fiat) married Clara Boselli (1869–1946)
    - Aniceta Caterina (1889–1928) married Carlo Nasi (1877–1935)
      - Clara Nasi (1913–2011) married Luca [dei marchesi] Ferrero de Gubernatis Ventimiglia (1906–1982)
      - Laura Nasi (1914–1996) married Count Giancarlo Camerana (1909–1955)
      - Giovanni Nasi (1918–1995) married Marinella Wolf (1922–2002)
      - Umberta Nasi (1922–2004) married firstly Giuseppe Frua de Angeli (1912–1981), and then Giorgio Ajmone-Marsan (1926–2009)
      - Emanuele Nasi (1928–1970) married Marisa Coop Diatto (1927–2016)
    - Edoardo Agnelli II (1892–1935) married Virginia Bourbon del Monte (1899–1945)
      - Clara Agnelli (7 April 1920 – 19 July 2016) she married Prince Tassilo of Fürstenberg (1903–1989) on 19 November 1938 and they were divorced. They have three children (see House of Fürstenberg (Swabia) for further descendants). She remarried Giovanni Nuvoletti (1912–2008) in 1974
        - Princess Ira von Fürstenberg (18 April 1940 – 19 February 2024) she married Prince Alfonso of Hohenlohe-Langenburg (1924–2003) on 17 September 1955 and they were divorced on 14 December 1960. They have two sons. She remarried Francisco Pignatari (1916–1977) on 12 January 1961 and they were divorced in January 1964.
        - Prince Egon von Fürstenberg (29 June 1946 – 11 June 2004) he married Diane Halfin on 16 July 1969 and they were divorced. They have two children. He remarried Lynn Marshall in 1983.
          - Prince Alexandre Egon von Fürstenberg (b. 25 January 1970)
            - Talita von Fürstenberg
            - Tassilo von Fürstenberg
            - Leon von Fürstenberg
            - Vito von Fürstenberg
          - Princess Tatiana Desirée von Fürstenberg (b. 16 February 1971)
            - Antonia Steinberg
        - Prince Sebastian von Fürstenberg (1950) he married Elisabetta Guarnati in 1972. They have one son and one daughter
          - Princess Virginia von Fürstenberg (1974–2023)
            - Baron Miklos Tassilo Csillaghy de Pacsér (1992)
            - Baroness Ginevra Csillaghy de Pacsér (1995)
            - Clara Bacco Dondi Dall'Orologio
            - Otto Leone Polenghi
            - Santiago Polenghi
          - Prince Ernesto von Fürstenberg Fassio (1981)
            - Princess Camilla Fürstenberg Fassio (2006)
            - Prince Sebastian Fürstenberg Fassio (2009)
      - Giovanni "Gianni" Agnelli (1921–2003) (also known as L'Avvocato) married Donna Marella Caracciolo di Castagneto (1927–2019)
        - Edoardo Agnelli III (1954–2000)
        - Margherita Agnelli (born 1955) married firstly Alain Elkann (b. 1950, divorced) and then Serge de Pahlen (b.1944)
          - John Elkann (born 1976) (current Chairman of Exor, Stellantis and Ferrari) married in 2004 Lavinia Ida Borromeo Arese Taverna (born 1977)
            - Leone Mosè Elkann (born 2006)
            - Oceano Noah Elkann (born 2007)
            - Vita Talita Elkann (born 2012)
          - Lapo Elkann (born 1977) married in 2021 Joana Lemos (born 1972)
          - Ginevra Elkann (born 1979) married in 2009 Giovanni Gaetani dell'Aquila d'Aragona (born 1973)
            - Giacomo Gaetani d'Aragona (born 2009)
            - Pietro Gaetani d'Aragona (born 2012)
            - Marella Gaetani d'Aragona (born 2014)
          - Maria De Pahlen (born 1984)
          - Pietro De Pahlen (born 1987)
          - Anna De Pahlen (born 1988)
          - Sofia De Pahlen (born 1988)
          - Tatiana De Pahlen (born 1990)
      - Susanna Agnelli (1922–2009) married Count Urbano Rattazzi (1918–2012) and had six children before their marriage was annulled in 1975.
        - Ilaria Rattazzi
        - Samaritana Rattazzi (born 1947) married writer Vittorio Sermonti (1929–2016)
          - Pietro Sermonti (born 1971)
          - Anna Sermonti
        - Cristiano Rattazzi (born 1948) president of Fiat in Argentina
        - Delfina Rattazzi
        - Lupo Rattazzi
        - Priscilla Rattazzi (born 1956)
      - Maria Sole Agnelli (1925–2025) married Count Ranieri di Campello della Spina (1908–1959) and had four children. After being widowed she then married Count Pio Teodorani-Fabbri (1924–2022) and had a son.
        - Virginia Campello della Spina (born 1954) married Giuseppe della Chiesa
          - Giacinta della Chiesa (born 1984)
          - Benedetto della Chiesa (born 1986)
        - Argenta Campello della Spina (born 1955) married Gianantonio Bertoli
          - Sara Bertoli (born 1979)
          - Alice Bertoli (born 1982)
          - Evelina Bertoli (born 1986)
        - Cintia Campello della Spina (born 1956) married Leopoldo Torlonia
          - Maria Sole Torlonia (born 1985)
          - Emanuela Torlonia (born 1988)
          - Paolo Torlonia (born 1997)
        - Bernardino Campello della Spina (born 1958) married Sonia Raule and then Francesca Rizzo
          - Tancredi Campello della Spina (born 1987)
          - Margherita Campello della Spina (born 1992)
          - Angelica Campello della Spina (born 1994)
          - Tristano Campello della Spina (born 2003)
          - Ranieri Campello della Spina (born 2006)
        - Edoardo Teodorani-Fabbri (born 1965) married Davina de Forest
      - Cristiana Agnelli (1927–2026) married Count Brandolino Brandolini d'Adda (1918–2005)
        - Tiberto (Ruy) Brandolini d'Adda married Princess Georgina de Faucigny-Lucinge et Coligny
          - Cornelia (Coco) Brandolini d'Adda
          - Bianca Brandolini d'Adda
        - Leonello Brandolini d'Adda
        - Nuno Brandolini d'Adda married Phan van Thiet
        - Brandino Brandolini d'Adda married Marie Angliviel de la Beaumelle, a member of the aristocratic Rothschild family
          - Guido Brando
          - Marcantonio Brandolini d'Adda
          - Gioacchino
      - Giorgio Agnelli (1929–1965)
      - Umberto Agnelli (1934–2004) married firstly Antonella Bechi Piaggio (1938–1999, divorced) and then Allegra Caracciolo di Castagneto (born 1945)
        - Giovanni Alberto Agnelli (1964–1997) married Frances Avery Howe (born 1965)
          - Virginia Asia Agnelli (born 1997)
        - Andrea Agnelli (born 1975) (former President of Juventus FC) married Emma Winter (b. 1977, divorced). Remarried Deniz Akalin in April 2023 (born 1983)
          - Baya Agnelli (born 2005)
          - Giacomo Dai Agnelli (born 2011)
          - Livia Selin Agnelli (born 2017)
          - Vera Nil Agnelli (born 2018)
        - Anna Agnelli (born 1977)

== Some notable family members ==
=== Giovanni Agnelli ===
In 1899, Giovanni Agnelli (1866–1945) and a group of investors founded the company Fabbrica Italiana di Automobili Torino (Fiat).

=== Edoardo Agnelli ===
Edoardo Agnelli (1892–1935), industrialist and vice-president of the Italian car company Fiat and IFI, was the son of Giovanni Agnelli (1866–1945), the founder of Fiat. He had seven children, Clara (1920–2016), Gianni (1921–2003), Susanna (1922–2009), Maria Sole Agnelli (1925–2025), Cristiana (1927–), Giorgio Agnelli (1929–1965) and Umberto (1934–2004).

Agnelli's daughter Susanna Agnelli was the first woman to have been Minister of Foreign Affairs in Italy.

=== Gianni Agnelli ===
Gianni Agnelli (1921–2003) was the oldest son of the industrialist and principal family shareholder of the Italian car company Fiat, Edoardo Agnelli. After WWII he earned a law degree at Turin University and his nickname was L'Avvocato ("The Lawyer"). He was the head of Fiat from 1966 to 2003 and made the company into the most important company in Italy and one of the major car builders of Europe. Gianni was a Fiat CEO. By 1956 he had become the "richest businessman in modern Italian history". In the 1960s and 1970s Fiat produced millions of modest cars including tiny 500 and 600 hatchbacks. Its Mirafiori plant in Turin, built 600,000 autos a year.

In the 1970s Gianni and Umberto Agnelli hired Cesare Romiti, known as Il Duro or the tough guy. During that time Fiat's production in Italy "peaked in 1970, when it employed well over 100,000 people there and made 1.4 million cars." Romiti led the firm from 28 February 1996 to 22 June 1998. Romiti was instrumental in the company's return to profitability during this period. Paolo Fresco succeeded him in the aforementioned post.

February 1992 saw the start of the mani pulite (Clean Hands) judicial inquiry into Tangentopoli, nationwide corruption with a large number of politicians, bureaucrats and entrepreneurs involved including senior Fiat executives.

In 1996 when Gianni reached the mandatory retirement age of 75 after serving as Fiat chairman for 30 years, Romiti replaced him as chairman. A year after Romiti took over as chairman of Fiat, he was convicted of "having falsified company accounts, committing tax fraud and making illegal payments to political parties." Romiti "was one of the most prominent people convicted since the start of Italy's campaign against corruption in 1992." Even though Gianni Agnelli was not implicated by the magistrates, some believed that he had lacked judgement in not denouncing Italy's endemic corruption and in downplaying Fiat's responsibilities. Gianni Agnelli in fact had defended the actions of Romiti and the co-accused Francesco Paolo Mattioli, Fiat's chief financial officer. A 1997 article published in The Economist quoted Gianni Agnelli confidence in the Turin Two's innocence and concluded that business attitudes among Italy's powerful ancien régime was left unchanged since the scandal of tangentopoli ("bribesville") emerged. "Mr. Romiti and Mr. Mattioli had approved a series of slush funds from 1980 through 1992 to provide for Fiat's illegal political contributions and had falsified accounts to hide the payments."

While Fiat was a family-controlled company, Gianni Agnelli alone held the family's controlling stake for nearly 60 years. Fiat is an "individual privately-owned oligopoly". Giovanni Agnelli & C. (GA&C), the family's limited partnership was Gianni's command center. By 2003, when he died, "The GA&C partnership was worth about 1.3 billion euros, and its assets consisted of listed holding companies Istituto Finanziario Industriale (IFI) and Istituto Finanziaria di Partecipazioni (IFIL), through which the family controlled Fiat and IFIL's stakes in other companies."

By the time of Gianni Agnelli's death in 2003, the "Agnelli family controlled Fiat through a chain of three separate holding companies." Giovanni Alberto Agnelli, Gianni's nephew, who died of cancer in 1997, had been in line to take control of the family companies. In 1997 Gianni publicly announced that his grandson, John Elkann, who was then 21, would succeed him as the head of the family empire. Edoardo Agnelli, Gianni's first-born son died in 2000.

He "died at the age of 81, after a prolonged battle with prostate cancer". At one time the Agnelli assets represented 4.4% of Italy's GDP. At the prestigious 2008 photography exhibition in Rome entitled Gianni Agnelli: An Extraordinary Life, the Agnelli family and the Italian government honoured L'Avvocato. Gianni Agnelli married Marella Agnelli (1927–2019) They had one son Edoardo Agnelli and one daughter Countess Margherita Agnelli de Pahlen.

According to the Independent Fiat survived the early first years of the twentieth century thanks to "generous government subsidies paid by Italian taxpayers." "As recently as 2002, Italy accounted for more than a third of Fiat's revenue, and the company built more than 1 million vehicles at six plants in the country."

Gianni Agnelli was considered to be the most prominent spokesperson representing the Italian economic elites.

Gianni explained his popularity in Italy by saying that he was "always present". "There was a war and I, like many others, took part. Then there were other events such as closer relations with the Americans, and I was there. ... We had difficult moments such as terrorism, and I never pulled back. In the course of our lives, of our generation, there also have been happier moments."

Professor Gaspare Nevola of the Università degli Studi di Trento, explained that Italian society celebrated a common sense of belonging and national identity through collective identification at Gianni Agnelli's Funeral.

At the end of the 1990s Sergio Garavini claimed that, "Fiat seems like the Austro-Hungarian empire on the eve of the First World War. ... When the big push came, it fell to pieces while the royal court continued to fight over succession." L'Avvocato's death was associated with the closing of a chapter by "commentators, politicians, and institutional representatives".

=== Giorgio Agnelli ===
Giorgio Agnelli (1929–1965) was a member of the Agnelli family. He was the second son of Virginia Agnelli and of the industrialist Edoardo Agnelli. His brother, Gianni Agnelli, was the head of Fiat until 1996.

=== Umberto Agnelli ===
Umberto Agnelli (1934–2004) was Gianni Agnelli's youngest brother. He was CEO of Fiat from 1970 to 1976. When he knew he was dying and Fiat was in financial trouble, Gianni asked Umberto to return as Fiat's CEO. Fiat had taken out a three-billion-euro loan in 2002 and was unable to pay it back. If they were unable to find a solution, Fiat would belong to its creditor banks.

Umberto Agnelli was chairman of IFIL Group, the family investment company.

IFIL's fat investment portfolio included stakes in Club Méditerranée, French conglomerate Worms & Cie., and department store chain La Rinascente, and provided the family with a steady stream of reliable dividends that offset the wild fluctuations of profitability—and lately, loss—at Fiat. Up until 2000, IFIL's profits had grown every year for 15 years, and it had paid 82.7 million euros in dividends to IFI, its parent company, in 2000.

— Clark

Umberto Agnelli was chairman and later honorary chairman of Juventus, the football team long-associated with Fiat and the Agnelli family. His son Andrea later followed in his footsteps as chairman of Juventus until 2022.

=== Margherita Agnelli ===
Margherita Agnelli de Pahlen (born 1955), the only daughter and sole surviving child of Gianni Agnelli, received an estimated inheritance of $2 billion when her father, Gianni Agnelli died. In a lawsuit filed in 2007 and rejected in 2010, Margherita Agnelli asked the annullation of the 2004 inheritance agreement signed with her mother; she said that it was based on incomplete information. On 30 May 2007, she filed a lawsuit against three long-time advisors of her father: Gianluigi Gabetti, Franzo Grande Stevens, and Virgilio Marrone. The lawsuit was also against her own mother, Marella Agnelli. The lawsuit demanded that Gabetti, Grande Stevens, and Marrone provide a report on her father's estate "with information pertaining to the historic evolution of the assets" from January 24, 1993, forward. D'Antona & Partners, a Milan-based public-relations firm, provided The Wall Street Journal with news of the lawsuit before the Agnelli family was aware of it. In Turin, Italy in March 2010 Judge Brunella Rosso rejected the lawsuit filed against Margherita's mother Marella Agnelli and advisers Franzo Grande Stevens and Gianluigi Gabetti. She had three children John, Lapo and Ginevra from her first marriage with Alain Elkann who inherited the largest shares of the Agnelli fortune. She had five other children from her second and current husband, Count Serge de Pahlen.

=== John Elkann ===
John Elkann (born 1976) is the CEO of Exor, an investment company controlled by the Agnelli family, which controls Stellantis, CNH Industrial, Ferrari, Juventus FC, Cushman & Wakefield and the Economist Group. In 2013 he was considered to be the world's fourth most influential manager under the age of 40 by Fortune magazine. He was chosen as heir to the family empire in 1997 by his grandfather Gianni Agnelli who died in 2003. Currently, Elkann chairs and controls the automaker Stellantis (which owns the Abarth, Alfa Romeo, Chrysler, Citroën, Dodge, DS, Fiat, Fiat Professional, Jeep, Lancia, Maserati, Mopar, Opel, Peugeot, Ram and Vauxhall brands).

He is the oldest son of Alain Elkann and Margherita Agnelli de Pahlen. In 2004 John Elkann married Donna Lavinia Borromeo, an heiress of the Borromeo family. His grandmother, Marella Agnelli (1927–2019) gave her shares to him to secure his control of the family empire. She divided up Gianni Agnelli's (1934–2003) personal assets with her daughter, Margherita Agnelli de Pahlen. Fiat formerly represented 4.4% of Italy's GDP. From 2001 to 2004 Fiat had lost more than 6 billion euros and was close to bankruptcy. CEO Sergio Marchionne returned the company to profit in 2005. In 2009 as the U.S. automobile industry was collapsing Fiat became a trailblazer by acquiring an initial 20% stake in the then-bankrupt Chrysler company in a deal with the Obama administration. This saved Chrysler. By 2013 Fiat was taking full control of Chrysler and merging Fiat-Chrysler into a global giant. By 2013 Chrysler was profitable again but an article in The Economist questioned the financial future of the merged company.

In 2005, Lapo Elkann, (born 1977) John's brother, was forced to leave the family company because of a scandal but by 2015 was still one of the largest shareholders in the family business along with John, and their sister Ginevra Elkann (born 1979).

Edoardo Agnelli

Edoardo Agnelli (9 June 1954 – 15 November 2000) was the eldest child and only son of Gianni Agnelli, the industrialist patriarch of Fiat S.p.A.., and of Marella Agnelli. He converted to Islam when he was living in New York City, and changed his name to Hisham Aziz and later to Mahdi after converting to Shia Islam. In mid-November 2000, he was found dead under a bridge on the outskirts of Turin.

== Family councilors ==
Gianni Agnelli's longtime financial advisors were Franzo Grande Stevens and Gianluigi Gabetti. According to an article in the Financial Post, in February 2007 Consob, Italy's market regulator, fined the Agnelli family holding company, then-called Ifil (now known as Exor), for engaging in a complicated illegal trade in 2005. They signed contracts with Merrill Lynch which allowed Ifil "to retain its 30 per cent of Fiat in spite of banks in the same period converting billions of euros of debt owed to them by Fiat into equity in the company." In the words of the Financial Post, Gabetti, Marrone, and Grande Stevens "were suspended from holding posts in public companies for between two and six months."

=== Gianluigi Gabetti ===
Gianluigi Gabetti was director general of IFIL Group, the family investment company since 1971 and worked there as Gianni's closest financial adviser for over 30 years. When Gianni died in 2003, Umberto asked the octogenarian to return as CEO of Ifil.

=== Franzo Grande Stevens ===
Franzo Grande Stevens (born 1928) is the lawyer of the family. In 2009, he was prosecuted for market manipulation in the equity swap of Ifi-Ifil (now Exor), Agnelli's holding company and Fiat's financial company.

== Participation in business and sports ==
Stellantis, a multi-national company and a core business of the clan, was established in 2021 after Fiat Chrysler Automobiles (FCA) and Groupe PSA merged. They have also majority control and some participation in several organizations, including La Stampa, the Turin daily paper owned by the family through GEDI Gruppo Editoriale, and The Economist, part of The Economist Group, the clan owns over 47% of the share.

Agnelli are also the owners of Juventus, the most renowned Italian association football club, and one of world's most successful teams, which was operated by the Agnellis since 1923 to 1943 and since 1947 to date. That society between the club and the Torinese industrial dynasty is the oldest and most uninterrupted in Italian sports history between a club and an investor, making the Old Lady one of the first professional sporting clubs ante litteram in the country. The Agnellis have the club's majority shares since it was constituted as a private limited company under the legal entity of società a responsabilità limitata in 1949, and have been credited for much of the team's success and by extension in the development of football in Italy due an administrative gestion model and sporting ethos called by the country's mass media since the 1930s as Stile Juventus, or Juventus Style, based in patience, consistency and a kind of effective and efficient long-term strategic planning unusual for the administrative model generally used in Italy, both of which the ownership is renowned for. Juventus success in the first half of the 1930s allowed that management to influence in the management model from other Serie A clubs since the end of World War II, emerging as the reference organisational model for the sport in the Peninsula. An Italian società per azioni since 1967, Juventus was presided since 2010 to 2023 by Andrea Agnelli, fourth member of the clan in front of the club's maximum dirigencial charge and grandson of Edoardo Agnelli, the first member of the family in do it as well as regarded the ideologue of the Juventus Style.

== List of businesses owned by the Agnelli family ==
- Christian Louboutin Ltd.
- Clarivate
- CNH Industrial
- The Economist Group
- Ferrari
- GEDI Gruppo Editoriale
  - Deejay TV
  - Elemedia
  - La Repubblica
  - La Stampa
  - Mymovies.it
- Iveco
- Juventus
- Philips
- Shang Xia
- Stellantis
  - Alfa Romeo
  - Chrysler
  - Fiat
  - Maserati
  - Opel
  - VM Motori
- Via Transportation
- Welltec

== Bibliography ==
- Clark, Jennifer (2024). L'ultima dinastia. La saga della famiglia Agnelli da Giovanni a John (in Italian). Milan: Solferino. ISBN 978-88-282-1455-7.
- Hazard, Patrick; Gould, David (2001). Fear and Loathing in World Football. Berg Publishers. ISBN 1-85973-463-4.
- Tranfaglia, Nicola; Zunino, Pier Giorgio (1998). Guida all'Italia contemporanea, 1861–1997 (in Italian). Vol. 4. Garzanti. ISBN 978-88-11-34204-5.
