= Porte, Piedmont =

Porte
- Comune
- Comune di Porte
- Coat of arms

- Location within Italy Location within Piedmont
- Coordinates: 44°53′N 7°16′E
- Country: Italy
- Region: Piedmont
- Metropolitan city: Turin (TO)

Government
  - Mayor: Laura Zoggia

Area
  - Total: 4.4 km^{2} (1.7 sq mi)
- Elevation: 427 m (1,401 ft)

Population (30 September 2010)
  - Total: 1,118
  - Density: 250/km^{2} (660/sq mi)
- Demonym: Portesi
- Time zone: UTC+1 (CET)
  - Summer (DST): UTC+2 (CEST)
- Postal code: 10060
- Dialing code: 0121

Porte is a comune (municipality) in the Metropolitan City of Turin in the Italian region Piedmont, located about 40 kilometres (25 mi) southwest of Turin.

Porte borders the following municipalities: Pinerolo, San Pietro Val Lemina, Villar Perosa, San Germano Chisone, and San Secondo di Pinerolo.
