= Pinasca =

- Comune
- Comune di Pinasca
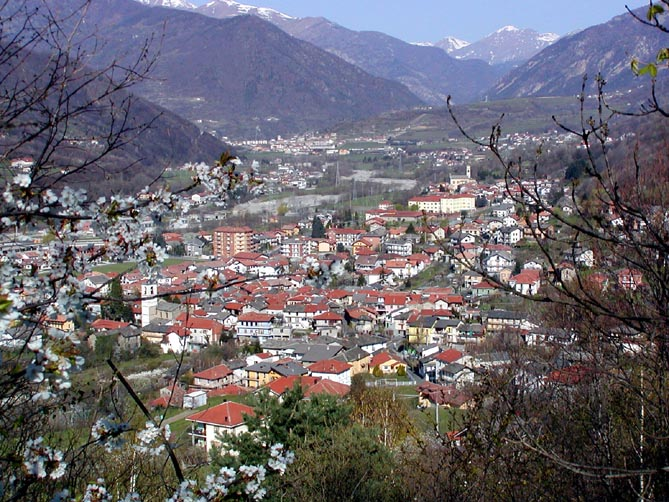

- Coat of arms

- Location within Italy Location within Piedmont
- Coordinates: 44°57′N 7°14′E
- Country: Italy
- Region: Piedmont
- Metropolitan city: Turin (TO)
- Frazioni: Dubbione, Grandubbione, Castelnuovo, Borgo Soullier

Government
  - Mayor: Roberto Rostagno

Area
  - Total: 34.72 km^{2} (13.41 sq mi)
- Elevation: 560 m (1,840 ft)

Population (31 August 2021)
  - Total: 2,850
  - Density: 82.1/km^{2} (213/sq mi)
- Demonym: Pinaschesi
- Time zone: UTC+1 (CET)
  - Summer (DST): UTC+2 (CEST)
- Postal code: 10060
- Dialing code: 0121
- Website: Official website

Pinasca is a comune (municipality) in the Metropolitan City of Turin in the Italian region Piedmont, located about 40 kilometres (25 mi) southwest of Turin in the Val Chisone.

Pinasca borders the following municipalities: Giaveno, Perosa Argentina, Cumiana, Pinerolo, Frossasco, San Pietro Val Lemina, Inverso Pinasca, and Villar Perosa.

== Twin towns ==
- Wiernsheim, Germany (1982)
