= Inverso =

Inverso may refer to:

- Inverso Pinasca, village and comune in the Metropolitan City of Turin in the Italian region Piedmont
- Peter Inverso, American banker and Republican Party politician
