= The Vatican Affair =

1968 film

- Directed by: Emilio Miraglia
- Written by: Augusto Caminito; Maurizio Costanzo
- Produced by: Pio Angeletti
- Starring: Walter Pidgeon; Klaus Kinski; Ira von Fürstenberg
- Cinematography: Silvano Ippoliti
- Edited by: Marcello Malvestito
- Music by: Luis Bacalov
- Release date: 11 September 1968
- Running time: 94 minutes
- Country: Italy
- Language: Italian

The Vatican Affair (Italian: A qualsiasi prezzo) is a 1968 Italian crime-action-adventure film directed by Emilio Miraglia and starring Walter Pidgeon and Klaus Kinski.

== Plot ==
A blind professor organizes a heist of Vatican jewels.

== Cast ==
- Walter Pidgeon as Prof. Herbert Cummings
- Klaus Kinski as Clint Rogers
- Ira Fürstenberg as Pamela Scott
- Marino Masé as Richard
- Corrado Olmi as Lentini
- Tino Carraro as Il maggiordomo
- Giovanni Ivan Scratuglia (as Giovanni Scratuglia)
- Roberto Maldera
- Guido Alberti as Cardinale Masoli
- Luciano Bonanni as Sergente dell'esercito (uncredited)
