= Matchless (film) =

Italian science fiction-comedy film

- US film poster
- Directed by: Alberto Lattuada
- Screenplay by: Dean Craig; Jack Pulman; Luigi Malerba; Alberto Lattuada
- Dialogue by: Jack Pulman
- Story by: Ermanno Donati
- Produced by: Ermanno Donati; Luigi Carpentieri
- Starring: Patrick O'Neal; Ira Furstenberg; Donald Pleasence; Henry Silva; Nicoletta Machiavelli; Howard St. John; Sorrell Booke
- Cinematography: Alessandro D'Eva
- Edited by: Franco Fraticelli
- Music by: Ennio Morricone; Gino Marinuzzi Jr.
- Production company: Dino de Laurentiis Cinematografica
- Distributed by: United Artists
- Release date: 13 August 1967
- Running time: 104 minutes
- Country: Italy
- Language: English

Matchless (also known as Mission Top Secret) is a 1967 English-language Italian science fiction–comedy film directed by Alberto Lattuada. It parodies the spy film genre.

== Cast ==
- Patrick O'Neal as Perry "Matchless" Liston
- Ira Fürstenberg as Arabella
- Donald Pleasence as Gregori Andreanu
- Henry Silva as Hank Norris
- Nicoletta Machiavelli as Tipsy
- Sorrell Booke as Colonel Coolpepper
- Howard St. John as General Shapiro
- Jacques Herlin as O-Chin's Doctor

== Reception ==
In a contemporary review, Variety stated that "if audiences are not yet satiated with spy spoofs, United Artists' Matchless may get an appreciative reception from the action market." The review noted that "the film doesn't take itself too seriously and makes some clever gibes at the expense of military and intelligence powers of all nationalities", but that "uneven acting and technical credits hamper the film's chances of rising above programmer status."
