= No desearás al vecino del quinto =

- Film poster
- Directed by: Ramón Fernández
- Written by: Juan José Alonso Millán; Sandro Continenza
- Produced by: José Frade
- Starring: Alfredo Landa; Jean Sorel; Ira von Fürstenberg; Isabel Garcés
- Cinematography: Hans Burnman
- Edited by: Pedro del Rey
- Music by: Piero Umiliani
- Production companies: Atlántida Films; Fida Cinematografica
- Release date: October 26, 1970
- Running time: 85 minutes
- Countries: Spain; Italy
- Language: Spanish

No desearás al vecino del quinto (Thou Shalt Not Covet Thy Fifth Floor Neighbor, released in Italy as Due ragazzi da marciapiede) is a 1970 Spanish-Italian sex comedy film directed by Ramón Fernández and starring Alfredo Landa, Jean Sorel, and Ira von Fürstenberg. A massive box office hit in Spain, the film became a linchpin for the mega-successful and profitable formula of Spanish sex comedies.

== Plot ==
In Toledo, a provincial town, Andreu, a handsome gynecologist, opens his practice without any success, as he is too attractive for the husbands and boyfriends of his patients not to be jealous of him. While Dr. Andreu fails miserably, the dressmaker Antón, owner of a boutique and with a reputation of being effeminate due to his manners and his little dog, makes the husbands feel confident in him, letting their wives shop in his boutique.

Dr. Andreu goes to Madrid to attend a gynecology conference and, dragged by his colleagues, decides to go to a cabaret. There, the doctor is frightened to see how Antón, his neighbor from the fifth floor, without a wig and displaying all his hidden masculinity, is having a great time between two beautiful women. When discovered, Antón confesses to Andreu that he pretends to be homosexual so as not to have problems with the husbands of his clients. Later he takes him to his apartment where, through a telescope, they flirt with two beautiful hostesses from the apartment across the street. Shortly afterwards they return to Toledo. There everything is gossip and provokes the same comment: what dirty friendship unites the gynecologist with the sensitive dressmaker?

== Cast ==
- Alfredo Landa as Antón Gutiérrez
- Jean Sorel as Pedro Andreu
- Ira von Fürstenberg as Jacinta
- Isabel Garcés as Socorro
- Margot Cottens as Jacinta's mother
- Adrián Ortega as Luis
- Annabella Incontrera as Matilde
- Guadalupe Muñoz Sampedro as Jacinta's grandmother
- Franco Balducci as Fred Corleone

== Release and reception ==
The film premiered in Madrid in October 1970 and became one of the most commercially successful Spanish films of the early 1970s, earning at least 177.5 million pesetas at the box office and watched by over 4 million people. Stewart King and Jeff Browitt consider the film to be the "most representative of a highly idiosyncratic comedy genre that flourished in Spanish cinema in the last years of the Franco regime".

César Santos Fontenla declared the film "one of the most aesthetically void [...] and morally repulsive [...] films [...] ever produced.

Alberto Mira denounced the film to be "worse than homophobic", "oligophrenic, machista".

== See also ==
- List of Spanish films of 1970

== Bibliography ==
- Jordan, Barry (2003). "Revisiting the 'comedia sexy ibérica': No desearás al vecino del quinto (Ramón Fernández, 1971)". International Journal of Iberian Studies. 15 (3): 167–186. doi:10.1386/ijis.15.3.167.
- Martínez Expósito, Alfredo (2004). "Visibility and Performance in the Anti-Gay Sexy Spanish Comedy: No desearás al vecino del quinto (1970)". In King, Stewart; Browitt, Jeff (eds.). The Space of Culture: Critical Readings in Hispanic Studies. University of Delaware Press. pp. 12–28. ISBN 0-87413-917-1.
