= Virginia von Fürstenberg =

Italian designer (1974–2023)

- Born: Virginia Maria Clara Prinzessin von und zu Fürstenberg; 5 October 1974; Genoa, Italy
- Died: 10 May 2023 (aged 48); Merano, Italy
- Spouse: Baron Alexandre Csillaghy de Pacsér (m. 1992; div. 2003) Paco Polenghi (m. 2004, divorced) Janusz Gawronski (m. 2017; div. 2020)
- Issue: Baron Miklós Tassilo Csillaghy de Pacsér; Baroness Ginevra Csillaghy de Pacsér; Clara Bacco Dondi dall'Orologio; Otto Leone Polenghi; Santiago Polenghi
Names
- Virginia Maria Clara Prinzessin von und zu Fürstenberg
- House: Fürstenberg
- Father: Prince Sebastian zu Fürstenberg
- Mother: Elisabetta Guarnati

Princess Virginia Maria Clara von und zu Fürstenberg (Virginia Maria Clara Prinzessin von und zu Fürstenberg; 5 October 1974 – 10 May 2023) was an Italian artist, poet, filmmaker, and fashion designer.

== Early life and family ==
Princess Virginia von Fürstenberg was born in Genoa, Italy on 5 October 1974 to Prince Sebastian zu Fürstenberg (b. 1950) and his wife, Elisabetta Guarnati (b. 1951). She was a member of an ancient Swabian House of Fürstenberg. Her paternal grandparents were Prince Tassilo zu Fürstenberg and Clara Agnelli. She was a niece of actress Princess Ira von Fürstenberg and fashion designer Prince Egon von Fürstenberg, the ex-husband of Diane von Fürstenberg. Von Fürstenberg was a first cousin of Prince Alexandre von Fürstenberg, Tatiana von Fürstenberg, Prince Hubertus of Hohenlohe-Langenburg, and the late Prince Christoph of Hohenlohe-Langenburg.

== Career ==
Von Fürstenberg was a fashion designer and creator of the fashion label Virginia Von Zu Furstenberg. She made her fashion debut in March 2011 at the Teatro Filodrammatici in Milan.

In September 2011, von Fürstenberg debuted a theatrical work titled DISMORPHOPHOBIA that combined spoken word, fashion, film, movement, and dance. She debuted her second collection at Milano Moda Donna in Milan on 23 September 2011. She also wrote poetry, and at times combined her poetry and fashion design in some of her work.

In 2012, she collaborated with Tommaso Trak to shoot a film focusing on the life of her great-grandmother, Virginia Bourbon del Monte. In 2017, von Fürstenberg created an art installation dedicated to her mother titled There was a nice home, which was displayed at the Grossetti Arte Gallery in Venice.

== Personal life and death ==
Von Fürstenberg married Baron Alexandre Csillaghy de Pacsér, a Hungarian nobleman, in 1992. Their son, Baron Miklós Tassilo Csillaghy, is an equestrian. Their daughter, Baroness Ginevra Csillaghy, has modeled for the Virginia Von Zu Furstenberg fashion line. She and Csillaghy de Pacsér divorced in 2003. In 2002, a year before her divorce was finalized, she gave birth to a daughter, Clara Bacco Dondi dall'Orologio, from her relationship with Giovanni Bacco Dondi dall'Orologio. In 2004, she married Paco Polenghi with whom she had two children, Otto Leone Maria Polenghi and Santiago Polenghi. Virginia and Polenghi later divorced. On 28 October 2017, she married Janusz Gawronski, Rawicz coat of arms, grandson of Jas Gawronski and a descendant of an ancient Polish noble family. In 2020, the couple divorced.

Von Fürstenberg went missing in October 2022 and again in February 2023, both times missing person reports were filed with Italian police.

She died on 10 May 2023, aged 48, after a falling from an upper-floor balcony at the Palace Hotel in Merano.
