= Carlos Pellegrini, Santa Fe =

Town in Santa Fe Province, Argentina

Carlos Pellegrini is a town in the center-west of Santa Fe Province, Argentina.

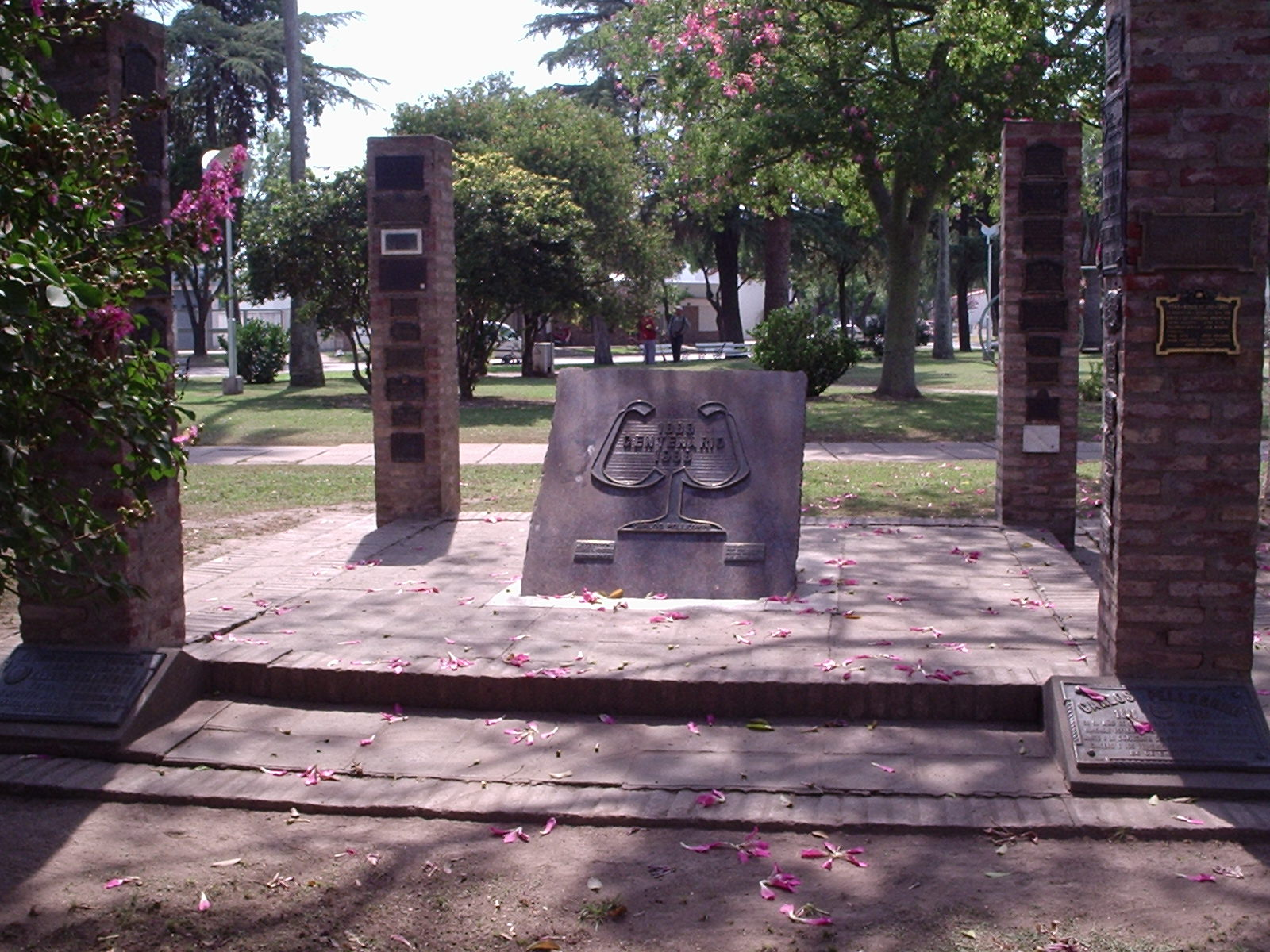
Carlos Pellegrini Plaza (central square)

According to the 2001 census, it has 5,062 inhabitants: 2,555 women and 2,507 men. It has had a growth of 158 (5.41%) over the 1991 census.

The area's economy is mainly farming and cattle.

There are two elementary schools, one middle school and two rural schools.

The town has two radio stations (FM) and one TV Station.

== Location ==
It is located in the center-west of Santa Fe Province at the intersection of routes 13 and 66, 170 km (106 mi) from the provincial capital, 180 km (112 mi) from Rosario, and 320 km (199 mi) from Córdoba.

- Altitude: 101 m (304 ft)
- Latitude: 32°03′S
- Longitude: 061°48′W

== Climate and topography ==
The topography of the area is slightly undulated, with uniform characteristics and slight slopes, which help with communications. The soil is very apt for agriculture. The area is located in an elevated terrain, at about 101 m (304 ft), which permits the natural draining of waters on all four points of the compass. As a result, flooding is rare.

Climate is temperate. It has a humid period from March to July. The last two months are not humid because of precipitation, but for the accumulated water in the soil. August would be the only dry month if not for the aforementioned. No month of the year presents an excess of water. January and February have a deficiency of 60 mm (2.3 in) together. During the rest of the year there is no water deficit because evaporation is amply covered with rain and soil accumulation.

== Twin cities ==
- San Secondo di Pinerolo, Italy
