= Agnello =

Agnello (Italian: [aɲˈɲɛllo]) is an Italian surname literally meaning "lamb". Notable people with the surname include:

- Bruno Agnello (born 1985), Brazilian football midfielder
- Carmine Agnello (born 1960), American mobster
- Carmine Gotti Agnello (born 1986) American reality television participant
- Chris Agnello (born 1968), American soccer coach
- Frank Gotti Agnello (born 1990), American reality television participant
- Giovanni Battista Agnello, Venetian author and alchemist
- John Gotti Agnello (born 1987), American reality television participant
- Louis "Cousin Vinny" Agnello, American writer
- Vincenzo Agnello Suardi (1582–1644), Roman Catholic prelate who served as Bishop of Mantua and Alba

== See also ==
- Agnelli
