= Villar Perosa =

Villar Perosa Lhi Vialars
- Comune
- Comune di Villar Perosa
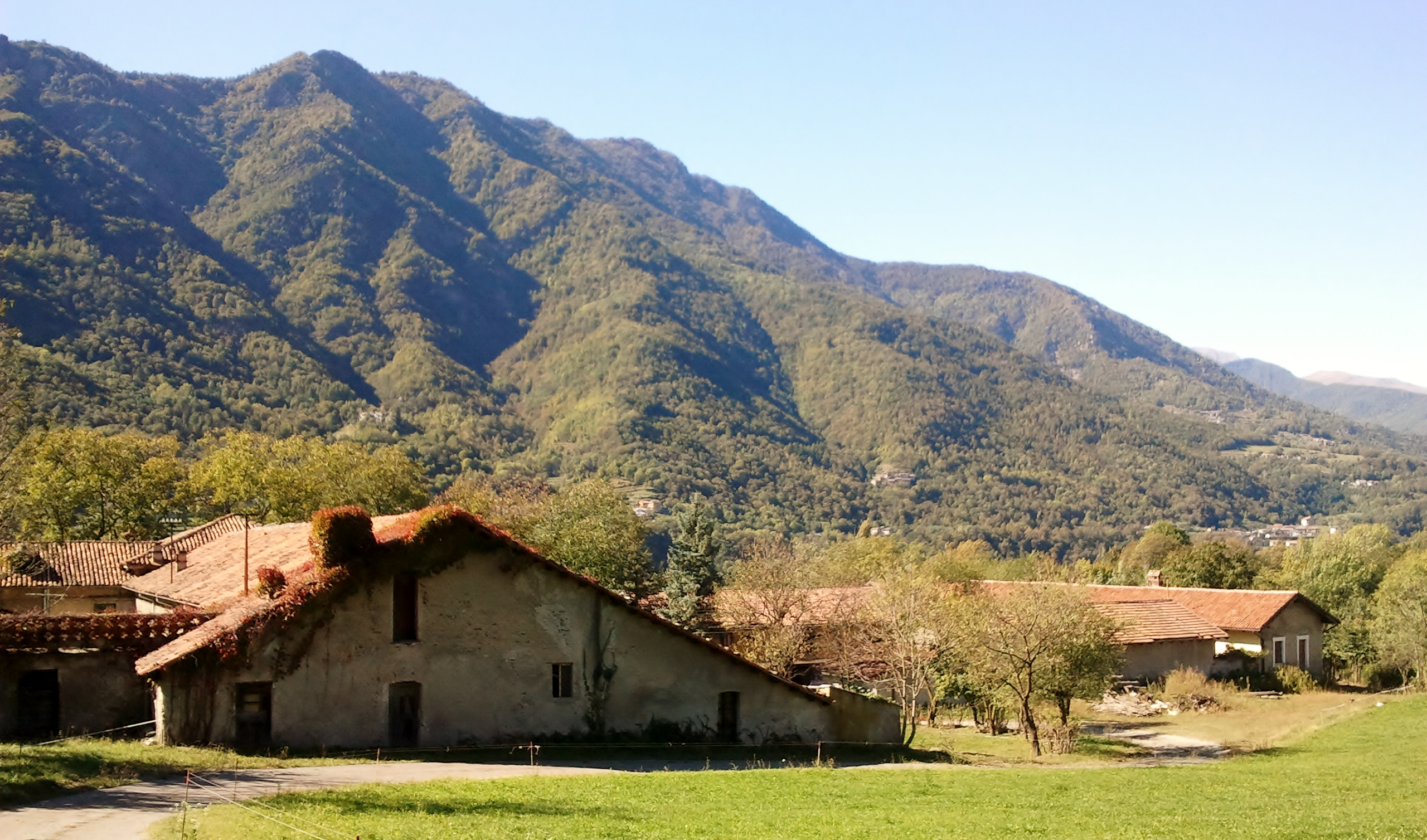

- Coat of arms

- Location within Italy Location within Piedmont
- Coordinates: 44°55′N 7°15′E
- Country: Italy
- Region: Piedmont
- Metropolitan city: Turin (TO)
- Frazioni: Artero, Azzario, Barbos, Bolombardo, Campassi, Cappelleria, Careiria, Casavecchia, Cascina Grossa, Cascina Marronea, Caserme, Cavallari, Ciabot, Ciabot Comba, Ciardossina, Ciardossini, Ciarriere, Comborsiera, Didiera, Droglia, Frieri, Gottieri, Icle, La Croce, Miandassa, Molliere, Morana, Muretti, Odriva, Pra Martino, Prietti, Russa, Saretto, Sartetti, Serre, Vignassa, Vinçon

Government
  - Mayor: Marco Ventre

Area
  - Total: 11.42 km^{2} (4.41 sq mi)
- Elevation: 489 m (1,604 ft)

Population (1 January 2017)
  - Total: 4,062
  - Density: 355.7/km^{2} (921.2/sq mi)
- Demonym: Villaresi
- Time zone: UTC+1 (CET)
  - Summer (DST): UTC+2 (CEST)
- Postal code: 10069
- Dialing code: 0121
- Website: Official website

Villar Perosa (Occitan Lhi Vialars; French: Grand-Villars) is a comune (municipality) in the Metropolitan City of Turin in the Italian region Piedmont, located about 40 kilometres (25 mi) southwest of Turin.

Villar Perosa borders the following municipalities: Pinasca, San Pietro Val Lemina, Inverso Pinasca, San Germano Chisone, Porte. Once a predominantly agricultural center, it is now an industrial hub with two SKF plants and one of ZF Sachs.

== Agnelli family estate ==
The area is often associated with the Agnelli family of Fiat fame as the family estate is located there. Members of the Agnelli family have lived in the country house since 1811. Marella Agnelli, widow of Gianni Agnelli, lived there.

The family estate has a football pitch which is sometimes used by Juventus for friendlies or training. It hosts an annual intra-squad friendly between the first team and the Primavera.

== Twin towns ==
- Pizzoni, Italy
- Großvillars, part of Oberderdingen, Germany
