= Dead Run (film) =

- Directed by: Christian-Jaque
- Written by: Christian-Jaque; Michel Lévine
- Starring: Peter Lawford
- Cinematography: Pierre Petit
- Edited by: Jacques Desagneaux; Alfred Srp
- Music by: Gérard Calvi
- Release date: 1967
- Language: English

Dead Run (French: Deux billets pour Mexico, Italian: Segreti che scottano, German: Geheimnisse in goldenen Nylons) is a 1967 American-German-French-Italian co-production crime film written and directed by Christian-Jaque. It is based on the novel Dead Run by Robert Sheckley. The movie was shot in Berlin, Vienna, Paris, and Lucerne Kanton Luzern.

== Cast ==
- Peter Lawford as Stephen Daine
- Ira Fürstenberg as Suzanne Belmont
- Georges Géret as Carlos
- Maria Grazia Buccella as Anna
- Werner Peters as Bardieff
- Wolfgang Preiss as Inspector Noland
- Horst Frank as Manganne
- Siegfried Wischnewski as Klaus
- Eva Pflug as Lili Manchingen
- Herbert Fux as Herbert
- Luciano Pigozzi as van Joost
- Wolfgang Kieling as Wolfgang

== See also ==
- List of American films of 1967
