= Bricherasio =

- Comune
- Comune di Bricherasio
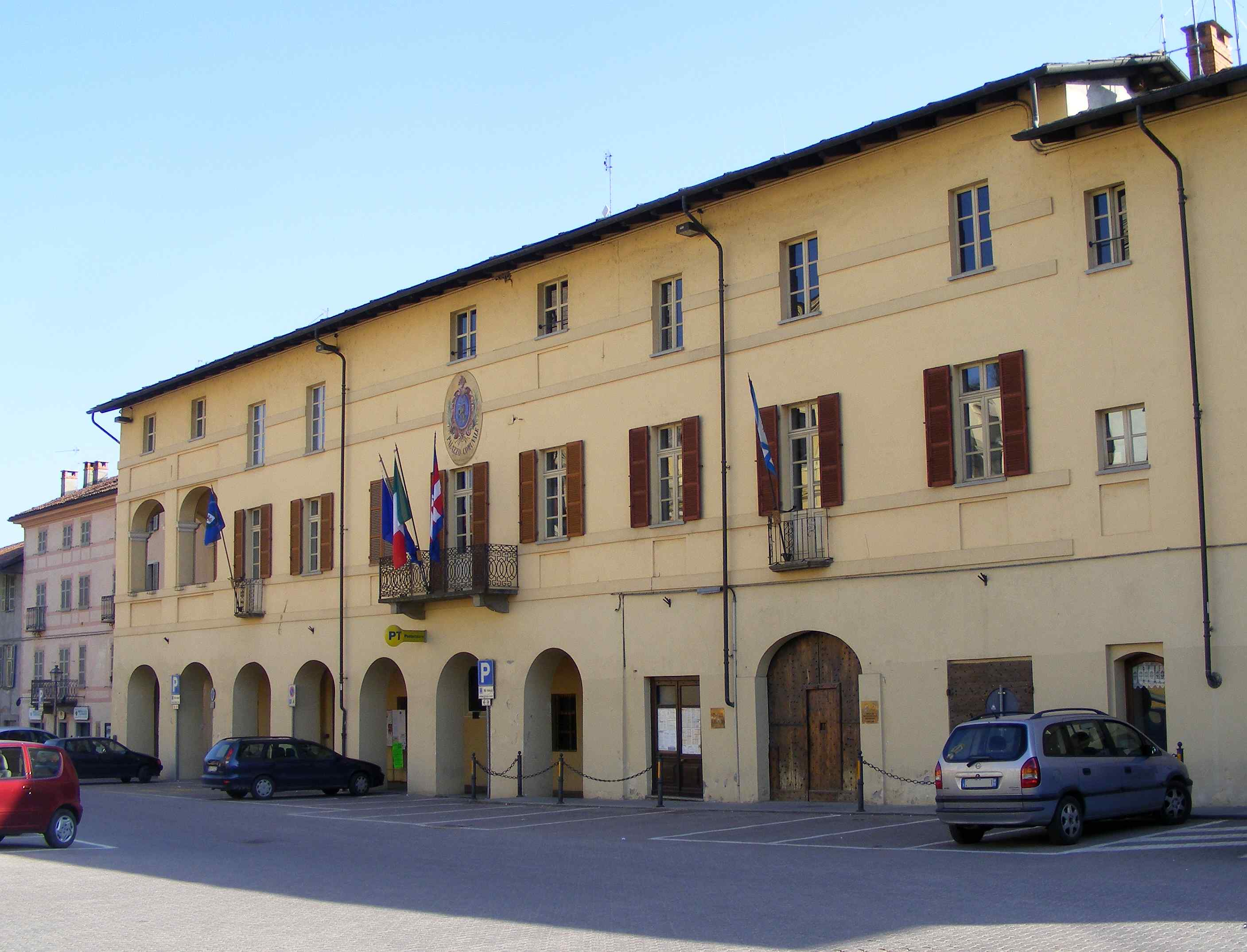
- Town hall.

- Coat of arms

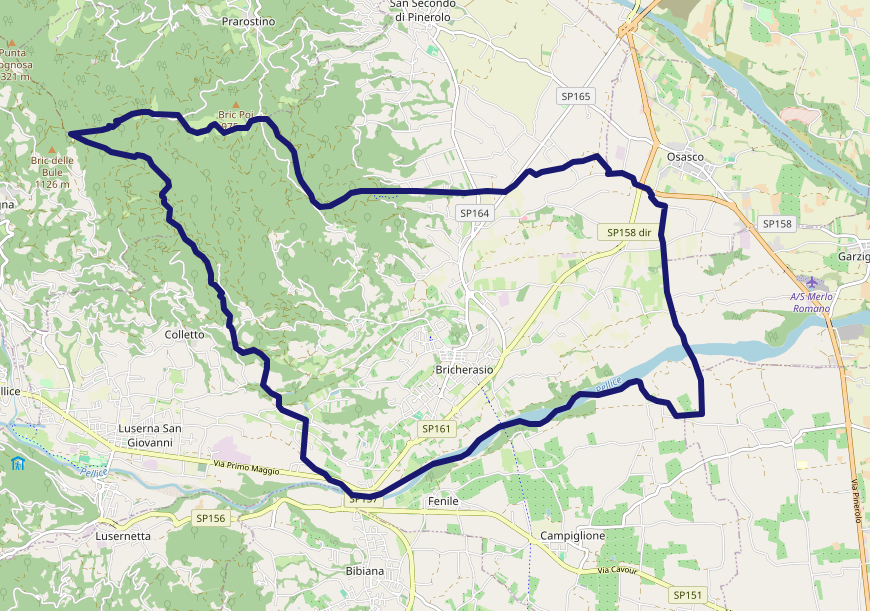

- Location within Italy Location within Piedmont
- Coordinates: 44°50′N 7°18′E
- Country: Italy
- Region: Piedmont
- Metropolitan city: Turin (TO)
- Frazioni: San Michele, Cappella Merli, Cappella Moreri, Sopravilla, Rivà

Government
  - Mayor: Simone Ballari

Area
  - Total: 22.76 km^{2} (8.79 sq mi)
- Elevation: 400 m (1,300 ft)

Population (30 August 2021)
  - Total: 4,600
  - Density: 200/km^{2} (520/sq mi)
- Demonym: Bricherasiesi
- Time zone: UTC+1 (CET)
  - Summer (DST): UTC+2 (CEST)
- Postal code: 10060
- Dialing code: 0121
- Patron saint: Assumption of Mary
- Saint day: 15 August
- Website: www.comune.bricherasio.to.it

Bricherasio (French: Briqueras) is a comune (municipality) in the Metropolitan City of Turin in the Italian region Piedmont, located about 40 kilometres (25 mi) southwest of Turin.

Bricherasio borders the following municipalities: Angrogna, San Secondo di Pinerolo, Prarostino, Osasco, Garzigliana, Luserna San Giovanni, Cavour, Campiglione-Fenile, and Bibiana. Economy is based on wine and fruit production (apple, kiwi, mushrooms).

== Twin towns ==
- Bell Ville, Argentina, since 1998
- Chorges, France, since 2003
