= Marcantonio Brandolini d'Adda =

Italian artist

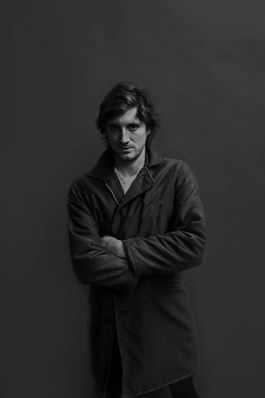
- Born: 18 July 1991; Neuilly-sur-Seine, Hauts-de-Seine, France
- Father: Brandino Brandolini d'Adda
- Mother: Marie Angliviel de la Beaumelle
- Occupation: CEO and Art Director

Marcantonio Brandolini d'Adda (18 July 1991) is a member of the Brandolini family, an Italian artist, designer and entrepreneur, CEO and Art Director of Laguna~B.

== Biography ==
Marcantonio Brandolini d'Adda was born in Paris, France, to an ancient Venetian aristocratic family. His father is Brandino Brandolini d'Adda, Count of Valmareno and his mother was Marie Angliviel de la Beaumelle, a French-Italian glass maker. His paternal grandmother is Countess Cristiana Brandolini d'Adda (née Agnelli), sister of Fiat chairman Gianni Agnelli and daughter of Edoardo Agnelli and Virginia Bourbon del Monte (daughter of Carlo Bourbon del Monte, Prince di San Faustino). His maternal grandparents were Armand Angliviel de la Beaumelle, a member of a prominent haute bourgeois family from Languedoc, and Baroness Béatrice Juliette Ruth de Rothschild, a member of the aristocratic Rothschild banking family of France.

Marcantonio Brandolini d'Adda lives and works in Venice. He succeeded his mother at the helm of Laguna~B, a company she founded in 1994 and active in glass processing and design. At the same time, he inaugurated his studio and began his practice as a solo artist.

In summer 2017, he held his first solo exhibition at ALMA ZEVI in Venice, creating a site-specific installation mixing brightly coloured cotissi glass. In 2018, the exhibition was also presented in New York: for the occasion, director Mafalda Millies produced the film “Indefinito”, filming the performance of dancer Megumi Eda, who dances among Marcantonio Brandolini D'Adda's sculptures to an original score composed by Charles Derenne. The performance was premiered at the Teatrino di Palazzo Grassi, Venice, in 2018.

His work "Indefinito n.1" became a part of the collection of Giancarlo Ligabue Foundation.

He has also expanded his work beyond glass to experiment with different mediums, materials, and techniques (including metalworking and drawing), maintaining a focus on technical craft in his practice.

He has participated in group exhibitions including The Glass Ark. Animals in the Pierre Rosenberg Collection (Le Stanze del Vetro, Venice, 2021) and Vitrea (Triennale Milano, 2021). His sculptures have been exhibited internationally at venues such as PATERSON ZEVI in London (2022), the Glass Museum in Murano, ALMA ZEVI in Venice and New York (2017, 2018, 2020), David Gill Gallery in London (2017, 2025), and Lyndsey Ingram in London (2024).

In 2025, he created a permanent site-specific installation at Palazzo Diedo for the Berggruen Foundation.

His work Suspension with a Table was presented in May 2026 at Palazzo Brandolini in connection with the Chanel Next Prize.

Marcantonio Brandolini d'Adda curated several editions of the Venice Glass Week, collective exhibition dedicated to the art of glass. As part of the Venice Glass Week, he established the Autonoma Prize and was a member of its jury in the 2020, 2021, and 2022 editions.

Furthermore, he co-founded Vital, a group of experts dedicated to preserving the Venetian Lagoon, and is a member of its Coordination Team along with Jane da Mosto. He also founded the Autonoma project, an international exchange programme with the Pilchuck Glass School in Washington, USA.

In May 2026, he established a publishing house and launched the magazine EVERYTHING alongside Laguna~B’s editorial team. The magazine’s debut was hosted in Venice during the opening of the 2026 Venice Biennale.

He's in a relationship with Margherita Missoni.
