= Joana Lemos =

Portuguese rally raid racer

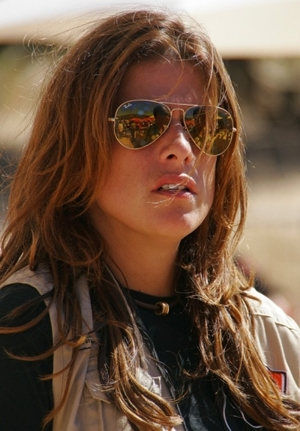
- Nationality: Portuguese
- Born: 24 April 1972 (age 54) Lisbon, Portugal

Joana Mascarenhas de Lemos (born 24 April 1972) is a Portuguese former rally raid racer. She raced on motorcycles between 1990 and 1995 and automobiles between 1996 and 2004. When she ended her racing career in 2006, she maintained her connection to sport, this time as an organizer of major sporting events, being largely responsible for the two editions of the Lisbon-Dakar Rally. Since 2012, she is Head of the Family Office of Maude Queiroz Pereira.

== Biography ==
Lemos started doing sports at the age of six. She did swimming, tennis, gymnastics, biking and fell in love with the mini-trampoline. Her father attempted to divert her into horseback riding; instead, Lemos took a liking to motor sports. She began with mini-motorbikes, then followed with motorcycling and later motoring.

After taking part in the first off-road rides in 1990, Lemos began her racing career, first on motorcycles and then in automobiles. She was the first Portuguese driver to compete in desert races and the youngest in the world to finish the Paris-Dakar Ladies Cup in a car, a race she won in 1997, alongside Carine Duret and behind the wheel of a Nissan Patrol. The car with which she achieved this feat was even made into a toy-shaped replica. Among her best results was placing in the 1999 Rally de Portugal, in a golden edition of the men's event, which had on the podium Colin McRae and Nicky Grist (1st), Carlos Sainz and Luis Moya (2nd) and Didier Auriol and Denis Giraudet (3rd).

Lemos has two sons, Tomás and Martim, from her first marriage to Portuguese banker Manuel da Costa Lobo Reymão Nogueira. On October 7, 2021, she was married a second time to Lapo Elkann, an Italian businessman heir and member of the prominent Agnelli family.
