= Laguna~B =

Italian company

- Company type: Società a responsabilità limitata
- Industry: Design
- Founded: 1994
- Headquarters: Italy, Italy
- Key people: Marcantonio Brandolini D’Adda (CEO and art director), Marie Angliviel de la Beaumelle (founder)
- Products: Design glassware
- Website: lagunab.com

Laguna~B is an Italian company specializing in the production of design glassware. Headquartered in Palazzo Giustinian Brandolini in Venice, it has been led by CEO and art director Marcantonio Brandolini D’Adda since 2016. The company operates a physical store in Venice.

== History ==
Laguna~B was founded in 1994 by Marie Angliviel de la Beaumelle (1963–2013), a pioneer in the glass design industry. The company transformed the "goti da fornasa" – the glasses that Venetian glass makers made for their own personal use to quench their thirst while working at the furnace – into an iconic and characteristic product.

In 2016, the son of de la Beaumelle, Marcantonio Brandolini D’Adda, took over the leadership of the company and reorganised its structure, transforming it into a leader in its field.

== Activities and projects ==
Laguna~B has collaborated with many local and international partners over the years. The "Goto glasses", part of the inaugural "Goto" collection crafted by founder Marie Brandolini in the 1990s, were featured in an auction at Sotheby's in 2022.

Laguna~B has also ventured into partnerships with brands and designers. Laguna~B collaborated with Saint Laurent, creating a line of glass tumblers for the fashion house. Similarly, its collaboration with interior designer Alyssa Kapito resulted in the creation of hand-blown Murano vases. Collaborating with fashion designer Fabio Quaranta, the company produced an artwork inspired by the glassblowers’ uniforms. Laguna~B also collaborated with Frédéric Malle, founder of the perfume house Editions de Parfums. From this collaboration, five hand-blown Murano glass candles were created.

In 2017, the company launched the "Autonoma" exchange programme on Murano Island, bringing foreign glassmaking masters and artists to the lagoon to promote glassmaking and glassblowing.

Laguna~B has also implemented the VITAL project, in collaboration with the "We are here Venice" association. This initiative brings together a team of experts committed to the conservation of the Venetian Lagoon, guided by scientific research.

The company's glassware has also made appearances in the film industry, particularly in Greta Gerwig’s Barbie. In one scene of the film, two Laguna~B Venetian glasses are visible in the background. These glasses are known as "Goto", invented by Marie Angliviel de la Baumelle and inspired by the glasses made by reusing the scraps from glass furnaces.

== See also ==
- Marie Angliviel de la Beaumelle
- Murano
- Glassblowing
- Università Iuav di Venezia
- Diptyque
