= Salvatore Agnelli =

Italian composer

- Born: 1817; Palermo, Kingdom of the Two Sicilies
- Died: 1874 (aged 56–57)
- Occupation: Composer

Salvatore Agnelli (1817–1874) was an Italian composer. He was born at Palermo, studied at the Naples Conservatory, under Furno, Zingarelli, and Donizetti.
