= Louis "Cousin Vinny" Agnello =

American morality writer

Louis Anthony Agnello
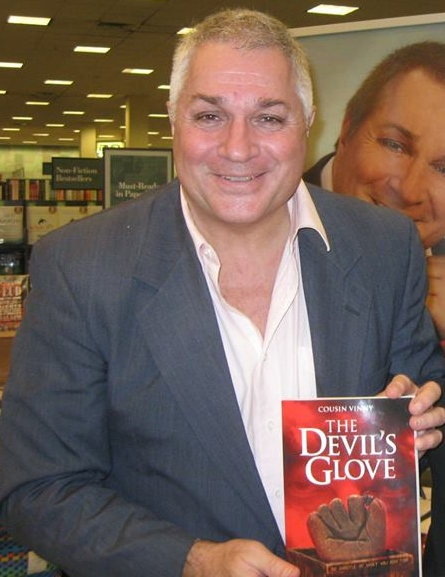
- Cousin Vinny on tour
- Born: January 30, 1960 (age 66)
- Other name: Cousin Vinny
- Occupation: Writer

Louis Anthony Agnello (born January 30, 1960) is an American morality writer known by his penname Cousin Vinny. He published the novel The Devil's Glove. The San Jose Mercury Newspaper described his life as an "eye-popping head swivel."

== Biography ==
=== Early life ===
Agnello was born in Flushing, New York. He worked as a stripper in New York to work his way through college. He later operated World Famous Cousin Vinny's Gorgeous Strippers.

=== Books ===
He released the book The Devil's Glove, a Christian morality tale, in 2014.

Agnello recently completed the sequel to The Devil's Glove called The Revenge of the Manager.
