= Marie Angliviel de la Beaumelle =

French-Italian glass maker (1963–2013)

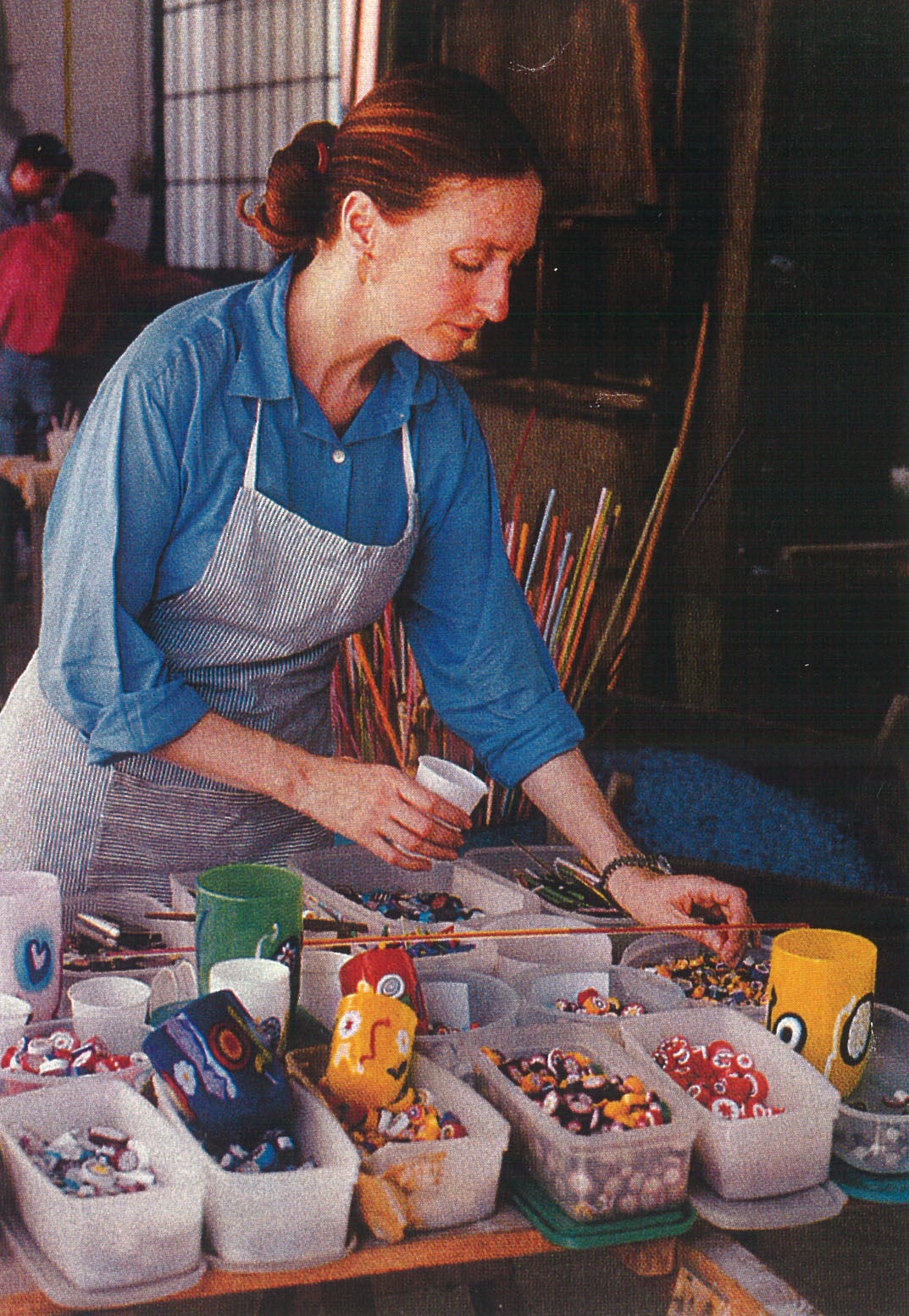
- Born: Marie Angliviel de la Beaumelle; 7 April 1963; Neuilly-sur-Seine, Hauts-de-Seine, France
- Died: 30 May 2013 (aged 50); Paris, France
- Spouse: Brandino Brandolini d'Adda (m. 1987)
- Issue: Guido Brandolini d'Adda; Marcantonio Brandolini d'Adda; Gioacchino Brandolini d'Adda
- Father: Armand Angliviel de la Beaumelle
- Mother: Baroness Béatrice Juliette Ruth de Rothschild
- Occupation: Glass maker

Marie Brandolini d'Adda di Valmareno (née Angliviel de la Beaumelle; 7 April 1963 – 30 May 2013) was a French-Italian glass maker.

== Early life and family ==
Marie Angliviel de la Beaumelle was born on 7 April 1963, in Neuilly-sur-Seine, Hauts-de-Seine. Her father was Armand Willem Angliviel de la Beaumelle, the son of Robert Maurice Angliviel de la Beaumelle (1885–1961), the Adjoint Chief of Cabinet of the Financial Undersecretary of State (1919) and Cecile Marie Browne (1903–1989), daughter of Willisem Frederik Browne (1864, Rotterdam – 1946, Monbazillac) and Marie Anne Gabrielle Roederer (1875–1968). Through her father, she was a member of a prominent haute bourgeois family from Languedoc. She is a great-great-great-granddaughter of Jean Angliviel, the older brother of Laurent Angliviel de la Beaumelle.

Her mother was Baroness Béatrice Juliette Ruth de Rothschild, a member of the aristocratic Rothschild family. Her maternal grandfather was Baron Alain de Rothschild. After her father died, her mother remarried Pierre Rosenberg in 1981.

== Adult life ==
She married Brandino Brandolini d'Adda, the son of Brandolino Brandolini d'Adda, Conte di Valmareno, a descendant of a Venetian patrician family and Cristiana Agnelli, in November 1987 in Paris. The couple had three sons: Guido, Marcantonio, and Gioacchino. They resided in the Palazzo Brandolini on the Grand Canal in Venice and at Vistorta, a family estate in Friuli.

Angliviel de la Beaumelle worked as a contemporary glass designer in Venice, founding the company Laguna~B in 1994. She also served as the president of the French Alliance of Venice, which promoted French culture in Italy. She was also a patron of the Murano Glass Museum and the Fondazione Musei Civici di Venezia. She has discussed the process she uses to make glass art in the media, including in Architectural Digest.

== Death ==
She died from cancer, aged 50, on 30 May 2013. She was given a Catholic funeral at the Church of the Transfiguration of Jesus in Vistorta. After her death, the Mayor of Venice, Giorgio Orsoni, offered his condolences to the Brandolini d'Adda family and referred to Angliviel de la Beaumelle as "a friend of Venice, a tireless animator of the cultural and artistic life of the Lagoon." Upon her death, her son Marcantonio took over the company Laguna~B.
