= Edoardo Agnelli (entrepreneur, born 1831) =

Italian entrepreneur and politician (1831–1871)

- Born: July 18, 1831; Turin, Italy
- Died: November 7, 1871 (aged 40); Turin, Italy

Edoardo Agnelli (18 July 1831 – 7 November 1871) was an Italian entrepreneur and politician.

== Biography ==
Edoardo Carlo Tommaso Agnelli, better known as Edoardo Agnelli, was the youngest son of Giuseppe Francesco Agnelli and Anna Maria Maggia. He was the father of Giovanni Agnelli, co-founder of Fiat S.p.A. At birth, he was baptized at home with the Superior's permission and six days later in the Church of San Carlo in Turin. His godparents were Tommaso Ferrero and Anna Maria Chiarini.

Agnelli participated in the administration of Villar Perosa and was a member of the city board since 1866. He became a protagonist of the city life in the Turin of his time. He was also active in the cultural field by joining the Society for Promotion of the Fine Arts.

== Marriage and descendants ==
In 1865, Agnelli married Aniceta Frisetti, who belonged to a wealthy family and with whom he had three children:

- Giovanni, co-founder of Fiat, who was born in Villar Perosa on 13 August 1866 and died in Turin on 16 December 1945.
- Carolina, who was born in the house of Via Cernaia 30 in Turin on 11 April 1868 and died at an early age.
- Felicita Carola Anna Giustina Maria, who was born in Villar Perosa on 3 November 1869 and died at a young age on 22 February 1871.
