= Inverso Pinasca =

- Comune
- Comune di Inverso Pinasca
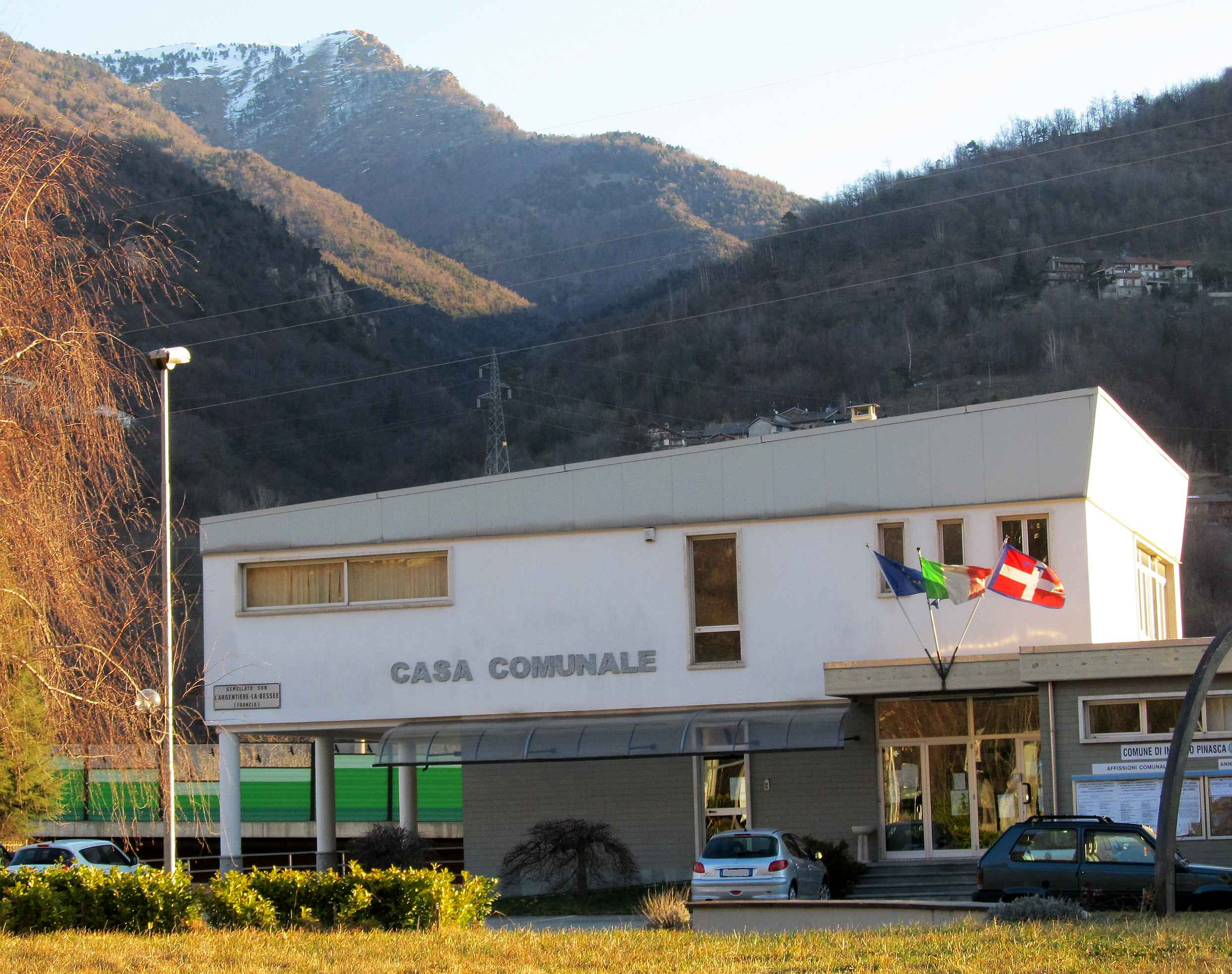

- Coat of arms

- Location within Italy Location within Piedmont
- Coordinates: 44°57′N 7°13′E
- Country: Italy
- Region: Piedmont
- Metropolitan city: Turin (TO)

Government
  - Mayor: Luciano Bounous

Area
  - Total: 8.03 km^{2} (3.10 sq mi)
- Elevation: 560 m (1,840 ft)

Population (31 August 2021)
  - Total: 695
  - Density: 86.6/km^{2} (224/sq mi)
- Demonym: Inversini
- Time zone: UTC+1 (CET)
  - Summer (DST): UTC+2 (CEST)
- Postal code: 10060
- Dialing code: 0121
- Website: Official website

Inverso Pinasca (Piedmontese: L'Invers ëd Pinasca; Occitan: L'Ënvers de Pinacha, French: L'Envers de Pinache) is a village and comune (municipality) with about 600 inhabitants in the Metropolitan City of Turin in the Italian region Piedmont, located about 40 kilometres (25 mi) southwest of Turin in the Val Chisone.

Inverso Pinasca borders the following municipalities: Perosa Argentina, Pinasca, Pomaretto, Villar Perosa, Pramollo, and San Germano Chisone.
