= Osasco, Piedmont =

Osasco
- Comune
- Comune di Osasco
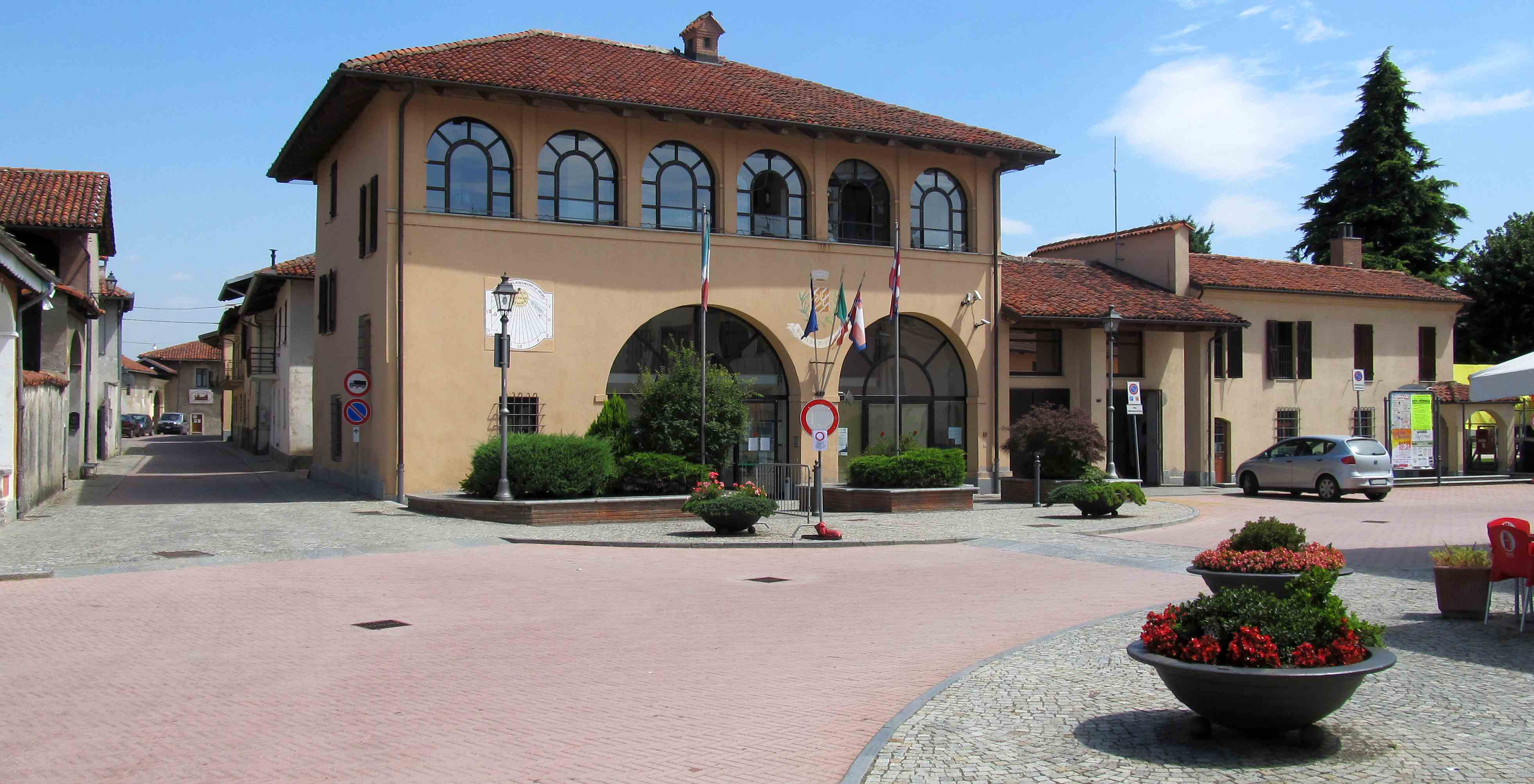

- Coat of arms

- Location within Italy Location within Piedmont
- Coordinates: 44°51′N 7°21′E
- Country: Italy
- Region: Piedmont
- Metropolitan city: Turin (TO)

Government
  - Mayor: Adriano Giovanni Miglio

Area
  - Total: 5.5 km^{2} (2.1 sq mi)
- Elevation: 344 m (1,129 ft)

Population (31 December 2010)
  - Total: 1,138
  - Density: 210/km^{2} (540/sq mi)
- Demonym: Osaschesi
- Time zone: UTC+1 (CET)
  - Summer (DST): UTC+2 (CEST)
- Postal code: 10060
- Dialing code: 0121
- Website: Official website

Osasco is a comune (municipality) in the Metropolitan City of Turin in the Italian region Piedmont, located about 35 kilometres (22 mi) southwest of Turin.

Osasco borders the following municipalities: Pinerolo, San Secondo di Pinerolo, Bricherasio, and Garzigliana.

== Twin towns ==
- Osasco, Brazil
