= Aniceta Frisetti =

Italian philanthropist (1846–1920)

- Born: 1846; Turin, Italy
- Died: 28 October 1920 (aged 73–74)
- Occupation: Philanthropist

Aniceta Frisetti (1846 – 28 October 1920) was an Italian philanthropist. She became a member of the Agnelli family when she married Edoardo Agnelli. Born in Turin, the daughter of Knight Giovanni Frisetti and Anna Lavista, her father belonged to a wealthy family and had close business relationships with Giuseppe Francesco Agnelli, the father of her first husband. Along with other noble women originally from the late 19th-century Piedmont, she took part in the relaunch of the Bandera embroidery, and founded the first laboratory school specialised in embroidery for artistic and humanitarian purposes.

Soon afterwards, the laboratory school was named Scuola Bandera Piemontese Torino and was directed by Countess Sofia Cacherano di Bricherasio. Moreover, Frisetti financed a variety of cultural and welfare societies, such as the prestigious Accademia Corale Stefano Tempia. After the death of her husband in 1871, Aniceta married Commander Luigi Lampugnani on 15 January 1883.
