= San Pietro Val Lemina =

- Comune
- Comune di San Pietro Val Lemina
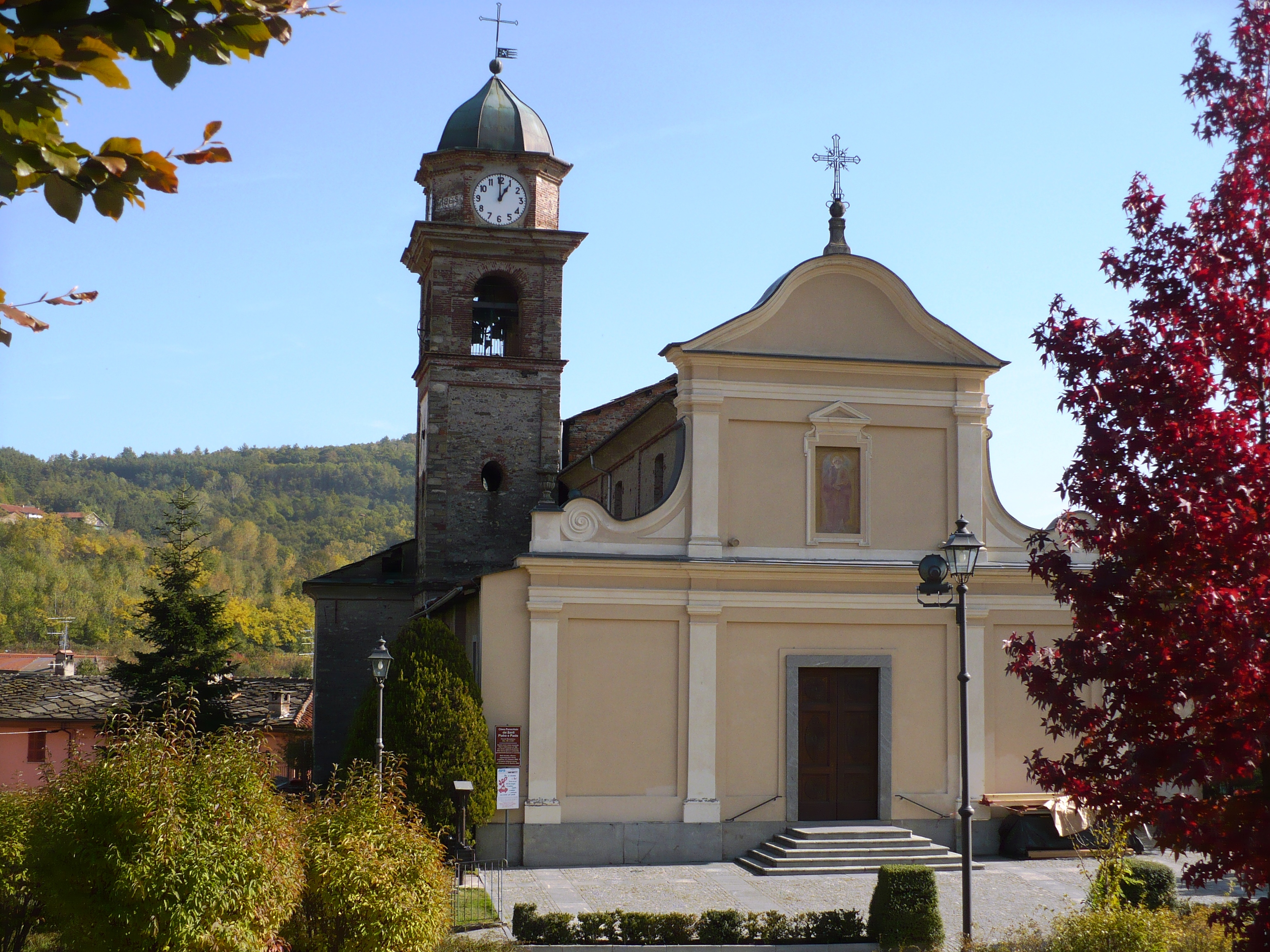
- Parish church.

- Coat of arms

- Location within Italy Location within Piedmont
- Coordinates: 44°55′N 7°19′E
- Country: Italy
- Region: Piedmont
- Metropolitan city: Turin (TO)

Government
  - Mayor: Anna Balangero

Area
  - Total: 12.43 km^{2} (4.80 sq mi)
- Elevation: 451 m (1,480 ft)

Population (31 December 2010)
  - Total: 1,471
  - Density: 118.3/km^{2} (306.5/sq mi)
- Demonym: Sampietrini
- Time zone: UTC+1 (CET)
  - Summer (DST): UTC+2 (CEST)
- Postal code: 10060
- Dialing code: 0121
- Website: Official website

San Pietro Val Lemina (French: Saint-Pierre) is a town and comune in the Metropolitan City of Turin, part of the Piedmont region, northern Italy. It takes its name from the Lemina torrent, which flows in its territory.
