= Prarostino =

- Comune
- Comune di Prarostino
- Location within Italy Location within Piedmont
- Coordinates: 44°52′N 7°16′E
- Country: Italy
- Region: Piedmont
- Metropolitan city: Turin (TO)
- Frazioni: Borgata Gay

Government
  - Mayor: Fiorella Vaschetti

Area
  - Total: 10.6 km^{2} (4.1 sq mi)
- Elevation: 738 m (2,421 ft)

Population (31 December 2010)
  - Total: 1,302
  - Density: 123/km^{2} (318/sq mi)
- Demonym: Prarostinesi
- Time zone: UTC+1 (CET)
  - Summer (DST): UTC+2 (CEST)
- Postal code: 10060
- Dialing code: 0121
- Patron saint: St. Bartholomew
- Website: Official website

Prarostino is a comune (municipality) in the Metropolitan City of Turin in the Italian region Piedmont, located about 40 kilometres (25 miles) southwest of Turin, at the confluence of Val Chisone and Val Pellice.

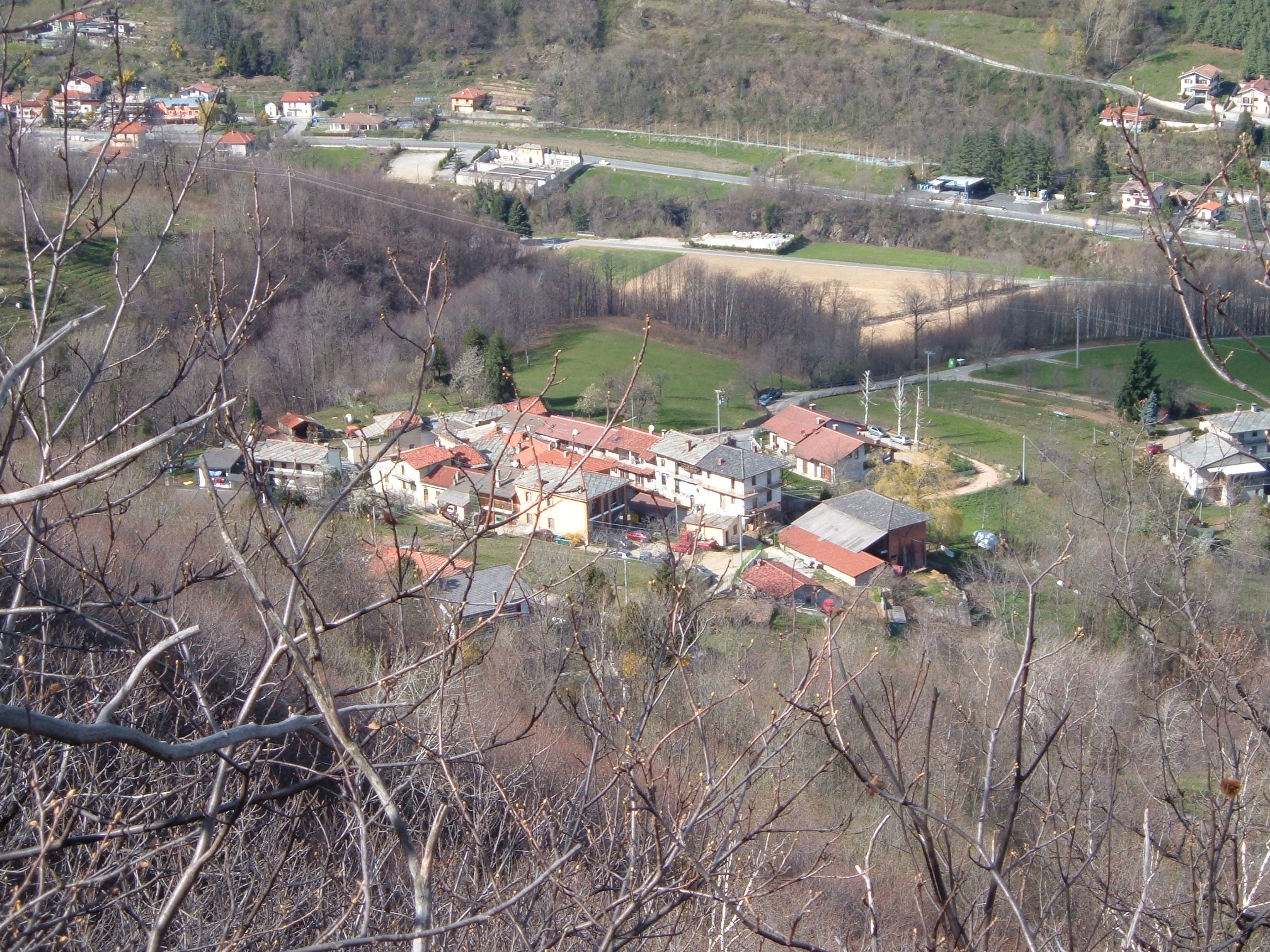

== Twin towns ==
Prarostino is twinned with:

- Mont-sur-Rolle, Switzerland (1976)
