= Ira von Fürstenberg =

Italian socialite and actress (1940–2024)

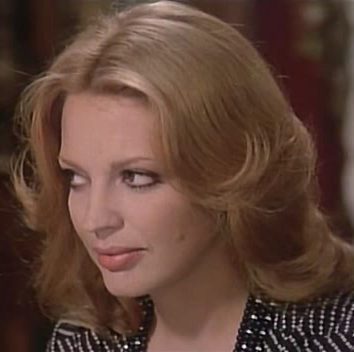
- von Fürstenberg in the 1975 film I baroni
- Born: 17 April 1940; Rome, Italy
- Died: 18 February 2024 (aged 83); Rome, Italy
- Spouse: Prince Alfonso of Hohenlohe-Langenburg (m. 1955; div. 1960) Francisco Pignatari (m. 1961; div. 1964)
- Issue: Prince Christoph of Hohenlohe-Langenburg; Hubertus von Hohenlohe
Names
- Virginia Carolina Theresa Pancrazia Galdina
- House: Fürstenberg
- Father: Prince Tassilo zu Fürstenberg
- Mother: Clara Agnelli

Princess Virginia von Fürstenberg (Virginia Carolina Theresa Pancrazia Galdina Prinzessin zu Fürstenberg; 17 April 1940 – 18 February 2024), known as Ira von Fürstenberg, was an Italian socialite, actress, jewelry designer, and public relations manager for the fashion designer Valentino Garavani. She was a member by birth of the princely family of Fürstenberg and a member by marriage of the princely family of Hohenlohe-Langenburg.

== Family ==
Von Fürstenberg was the daughter of Tassilo Fürstenberg from the house of Fürstenberg and his first wife, Clara Agnelli of the FIAT Agnelli family. The elder of her two brothers, Prince Egon von Fürstenberg, became a fashion designer. She also had a younger brother, Prince Sebastian. Her former sister-in-law is the fashion designer Diane von Fürstenberg, and an uncle was Gianni Agnelli, the chairman of FIAT. She was a first cousin of Prince Karl von Schwarzenberg, the influential Minister of Foreign Affairs of the Czech Republic.

== Early life ==
Von Fürstenberg was born in Rome, Italy, on 17 April 1940. During the Second World War, she lived in Switzerland, later in Italy and Austria. When her parents separated she was educated in a boarding school in England for a while. She spoke several languages, including English, French, German, Spanish, and Italian.

== Career ==
Ira von Fürstenberg started a modeling career at age 13, walking down the runway for Emilio Pucci, and later collaborating with Diana Vreeland. She posed for Helmut Newton and Cecil Beaton.

She was well known by the tabloid press. Film producer Dino De Laurentiis thought of a career in film for her and offered her a role in his Matchless, a 1968 parody of James Bond, co-starring Patrick O'Neal. It became the first of 28 films, some of them European coproductions of genre films. She never trained as an actor. In 1968 Roger Vadim offered her Barbarella, but she declined, and Jane Fonda landed a success. Her appearances included I Killed Rasputin (1967), Dead Run (1967, co-starring Peter Lawford), Negresco (1968), The Vatican Affair (1968), The Battle of El Alamein (1969), Five Dolls for an August Moon (1970), No desearás al vecino del quinto (1970), Hello-Goodbye (1970) alongside Curd Jürgens, and The Fifth Cord (1971).

She co-hosted the 20th edition of the Sanremo Music Festival with Nuccio Costa and Enrico Maria Salerno in 1970. She returned to fashion, with a post of president of the Italian branch of the cosmetics company Germaine Montell, and from 1978 general director of Valentino. In 1992, she founded a fashion house, the "Ira von Fürstenberg Collection", and designed jewelry titled Objets Uniques. She presented a television show in German, "Palastgeflüster, on SAT.1 from 1992.

She became the patron of a number of charities, including the Children of Africa Foundation set up by Dominique Ouattara.

== Personal life ==
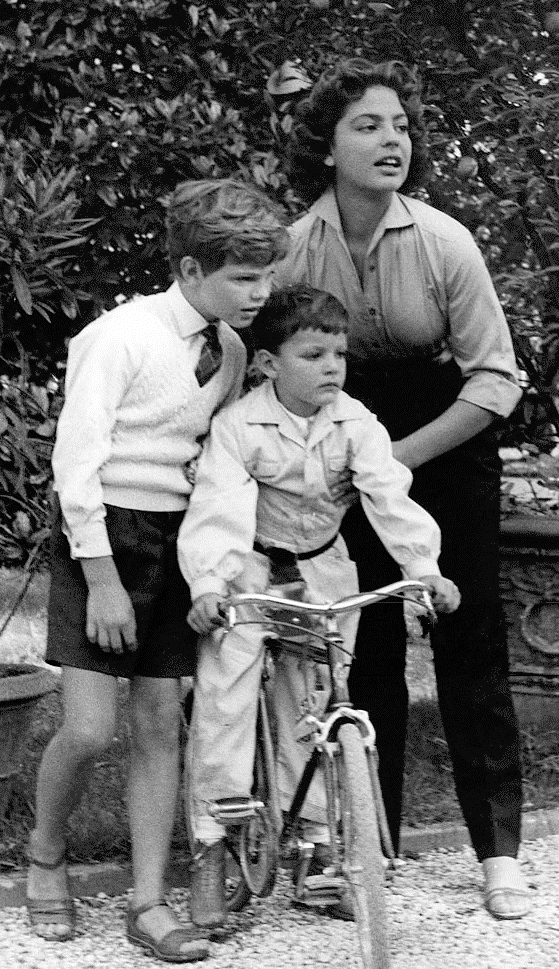
Ira von Fürstenberg with her brothers in 1955

Her first husband was Prince Alfonso of Hohenlohe-Langenburg (1924–2003), who founded the Marbella Club, a Spanish resort. They married in Venice on 17 September 1955, when she was aged 15 and the groom, 31. The wedding was a lavish feast, attended by international society.

The couple had two children:

- Christoph Victorio Egon Humberto (known as "Kiko"; 8 November 1956 – 6 August 2006), who died of massive organ failure a few days after being imprisoned in Klongprem Central Prison in Bangkok on charges of suspicion of illegally altering a visa. His health had been weakened from a weight-loss regimen at a Thai wellness center.
- Hubertus Rudolph (known as "Hubi"; born 2 February 1959), a musician and photographer who was on Mexico's Olympic skiing team in 1984, 1988, 1992, 1994, 2010, and 2014. Married to Simona Gandolfi on 17 June 2019 in Vaduz.

They lived in Mexico City, because her husband had family ties there, and introduced the VW Beetle into Latin America. She left with the children in 1960. They were divorced in 1960, and the marriage was annulled in 1969.

Her second husband was Francisco "Baby" Pignatari (1916–1977), a Brazilian industrialist. They married in Reno, Nevada, on 12 January 1961. They divorced in Las Vegas in January 1964.

== Death ==
Von Fürstenberg died on 18 February 2024, at the age of 83, from injuries sustained in a "domestic accident" at her residence in Rome. The funeral service took place on 23 February 2024 in the Church of Santa Maria in Rome. In addition to the family, John Elkann and his wife Lavinia, Tomás Terry and Marisela Federici were also present. Her grave is located in the cemetery in Strobl am Wolfgangsee.

== Selected filmography ==
- Matchless (1967)
- Dead Run (1967)
- I Killed Rasputin (1967)
- Caprice Italian Style (1968)
- Negresco (1968)
- The Vatican Affair (1968)
- The Battle of El Alamein (1969)
- Five Dolls for an August Moon (1970)
- No desearás al vecino del quinto (1970)
- Hello-Goodbye (1970)
- The Beasts (1971)
- The Fifth Cord (1971)
- Nights and Loves of Don Juan (1971)
- Deaf Smith & Johnny Ears (1973)
- Processo per direttissima (1974)

== Published works ==
- Fürstenberg, Ira von (1981). Young at Any Age. Weidenfeld & Nicolson. ISBN 978-0-297-77921-6. OCLC 16560517.
- ——; Nicolls, Andrew (1996). Tartanware Souvenirs from Scotland. Pavilion Books, Limited. ISBN 978-1-85793-514-1. OCLC 37370732.
- —— (1995). Princesse et rebelle (in French). Critérion. ISBN 978-2-7413-0127-1. OCLC 34313917.
