= Mercenasco =

- Comune
- Comune di Mercenasco
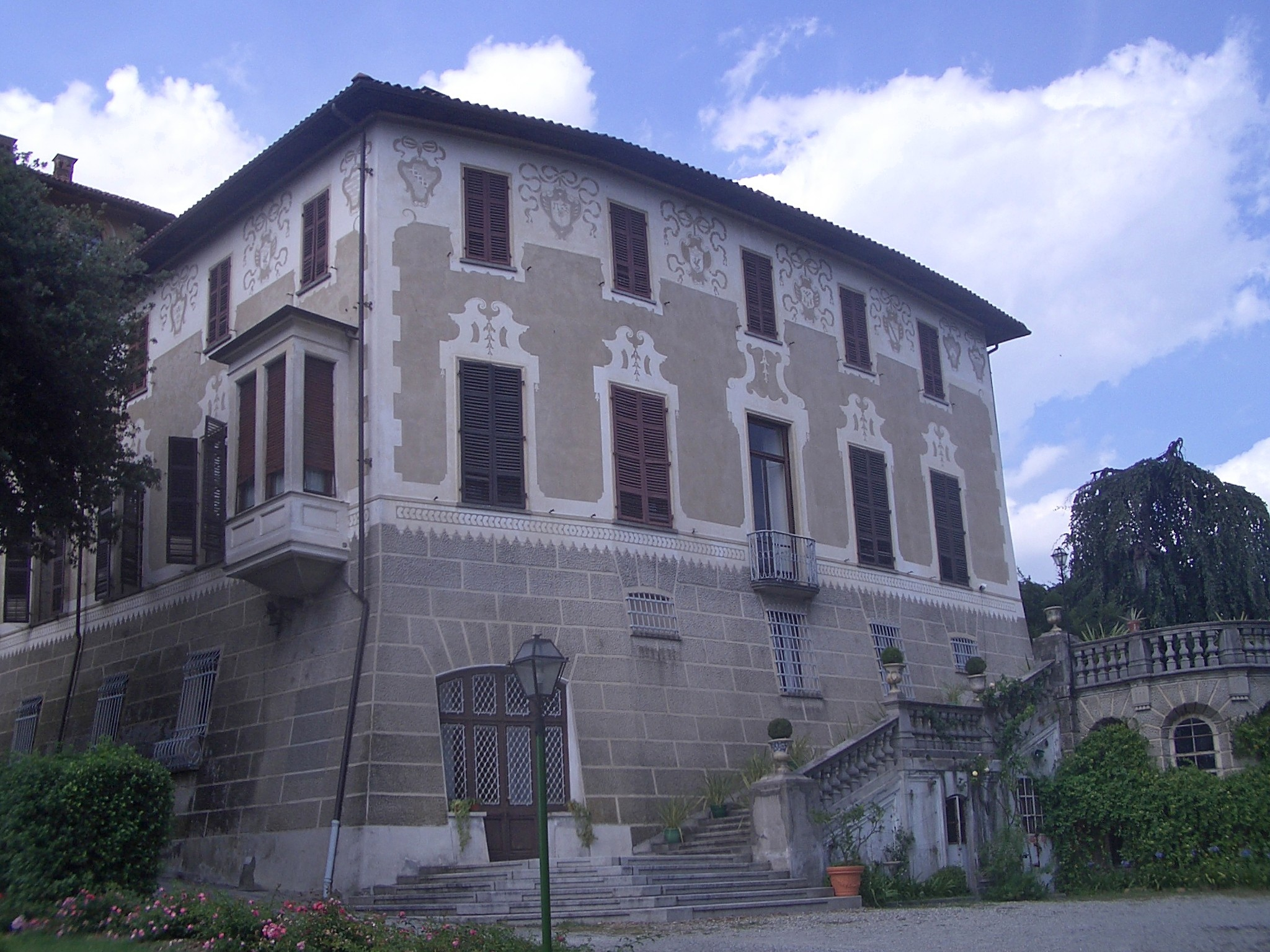
- Castello Benso.

- Coat of arms

- Location within Italy Location within Piedmont
- Coordinates: 45°21′N 7°53′E
- Country: Italy
- Region: Piedmont
- Metropolitan city: Turin (TO)
- Frazioni: Villate

Government
  - Mayor: Angelo Parri

Area
  - Total: 12.64 km^{2} (4.88 sq mi)
- Elevation: 330 m (1,080 ft)

Population (31 August 2021)
  - Total: 1,284
  - Density: 101.6/km^{2} (263.1/sq mi)
- Demonym: Mercenaschesi
- Time zone: UTC+1 (CET)
  - Summer (DST): UTC+2 (CEST)
- Postal code: 10010
- Dialing code: 0125
- Website: Official website

Mercenasco is a comune (municipality) in the Metropolitan City of Turin in the Italian region Piedmont, located about 35 kilometres (22 mi) northeast of Turin.

Mercenasco Castle is located in the village.
