= Mercenasco Castle =

- Castello di Mercenasco
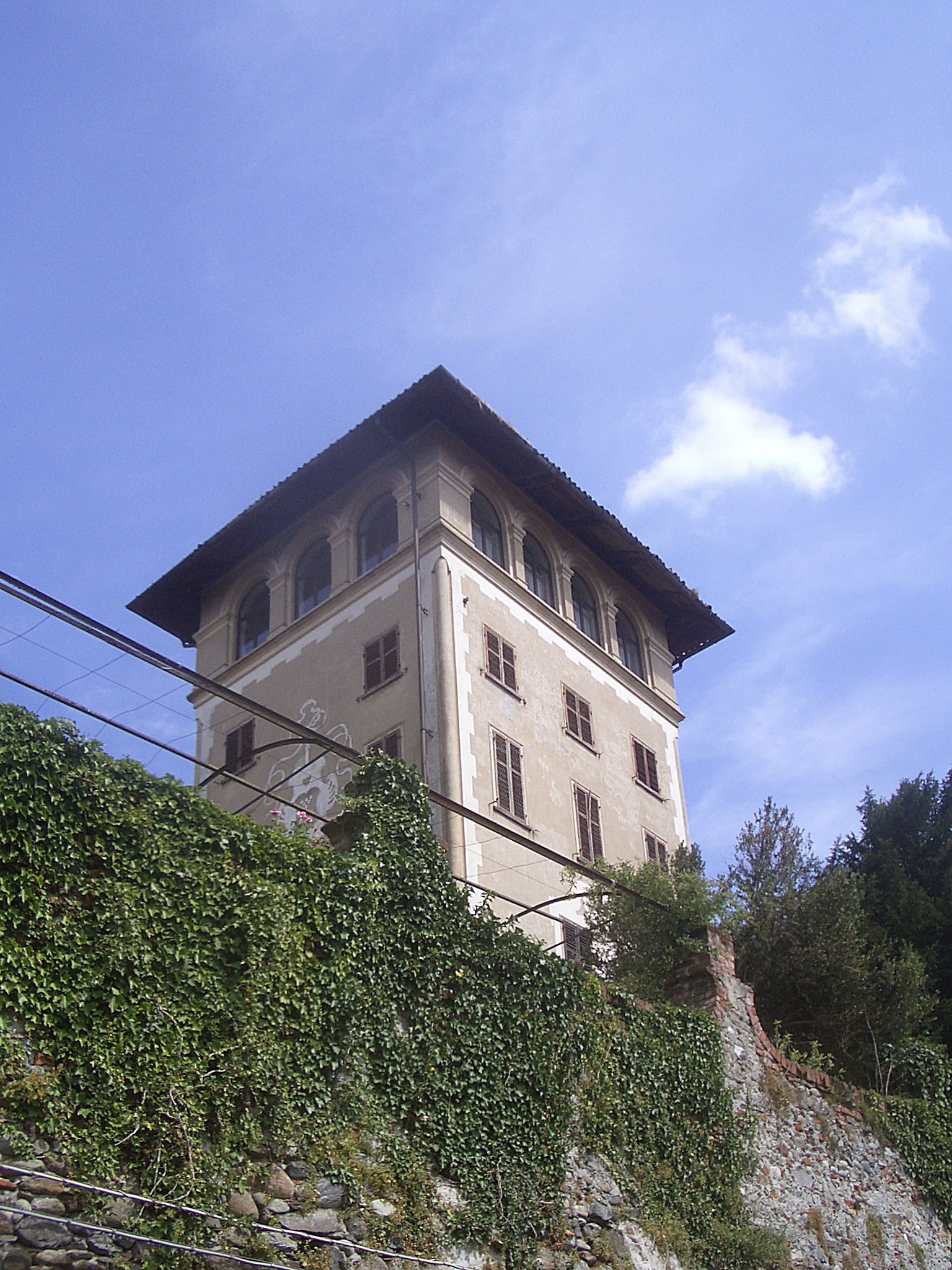
- Mercenasco Castle in 2009
- Click on the map for a fullscreen view

General information
- Location: Mercenasco, Italy
- Coordinates: 45°21′21.24″N 7°53′00.29″E

Mercenasco Castle (Italian: Castello di Mercenasco) is a castle located in Mercenasco, Piedmont, Italy.

== History ==
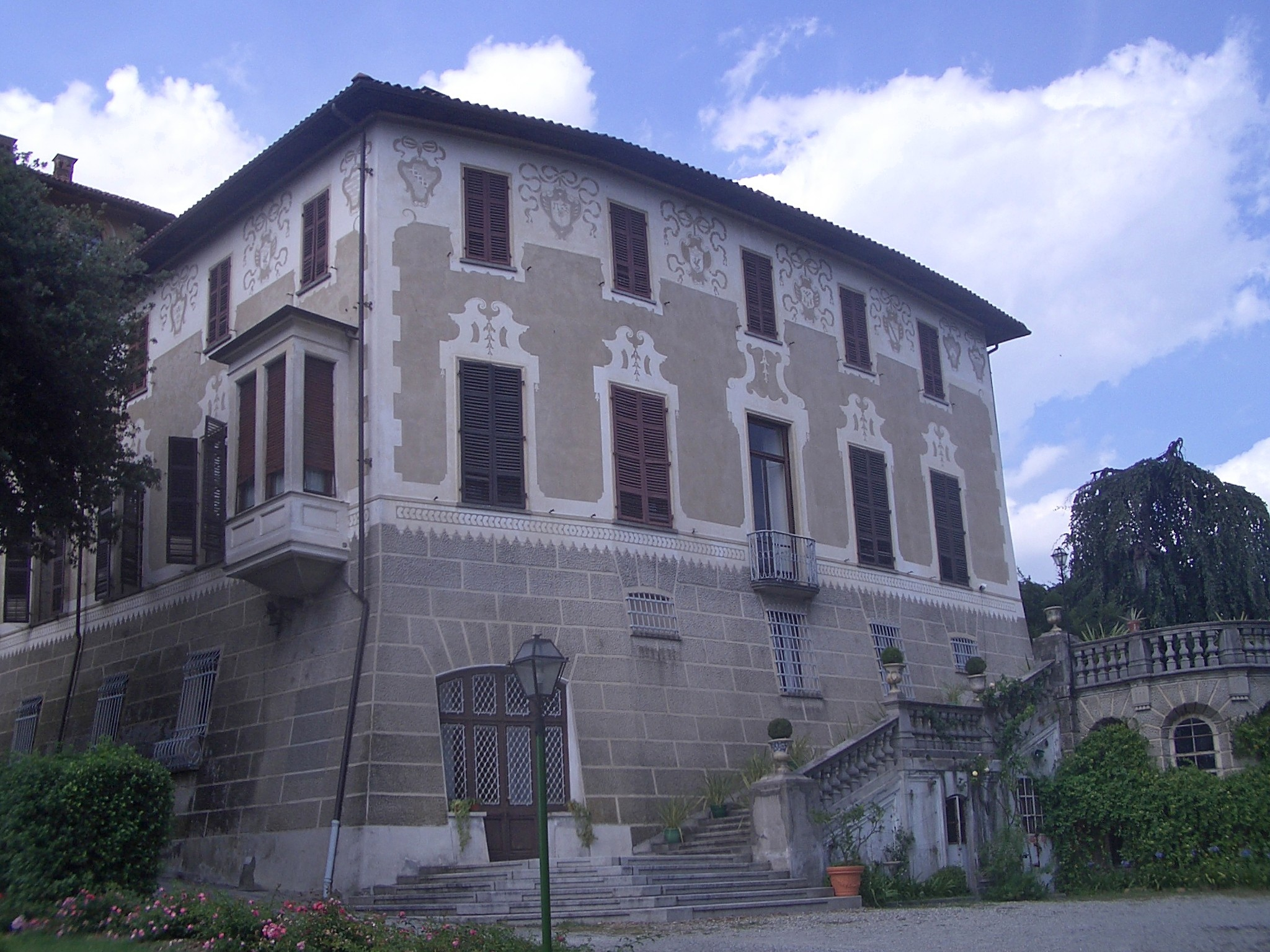
Southern view

The first recorded evidence of the existence of the castle, which was likely connected to a fortified settlement or ricetto, dates back to 1142, when Guglielmo Borgio of Mercenasco pledged allegiance to the city of Vercelli. From 1280, the fief came under the co-lordship of the Valperga family. During the 14th century, amid the conflicts between the House of Savoy and Montferrat, the castle was burned and looted. With the Treaty of Cherasco in 1631, the fief was permanently transferred under the control of the House of Savoy, who in 1646 ceded it to Gaspare Graneris de la Roche, president and general of finances.

Severely damaged during the Napoleonic invasions, the castle was purchased in the 19th century by Count Alessandro Compans of Brichanteau, who initiated an ambitious restoration, completed by his son Carlo in 1925. Architect Chevalley transformed the structure into a stately residence, redesigning its horseshoe-shaped layout, raising the tower, and embellishing the façades with heraldic decorations. In 1967, the property was purchased by Counts Benso di Arese di Villamirana.
