= Sacra di San Michele =

Religious complex on Mount Pirchiriano, Italy

Saint Michael's Abbey
- Abbazia della Sacra di San Michele (Arcangelo)
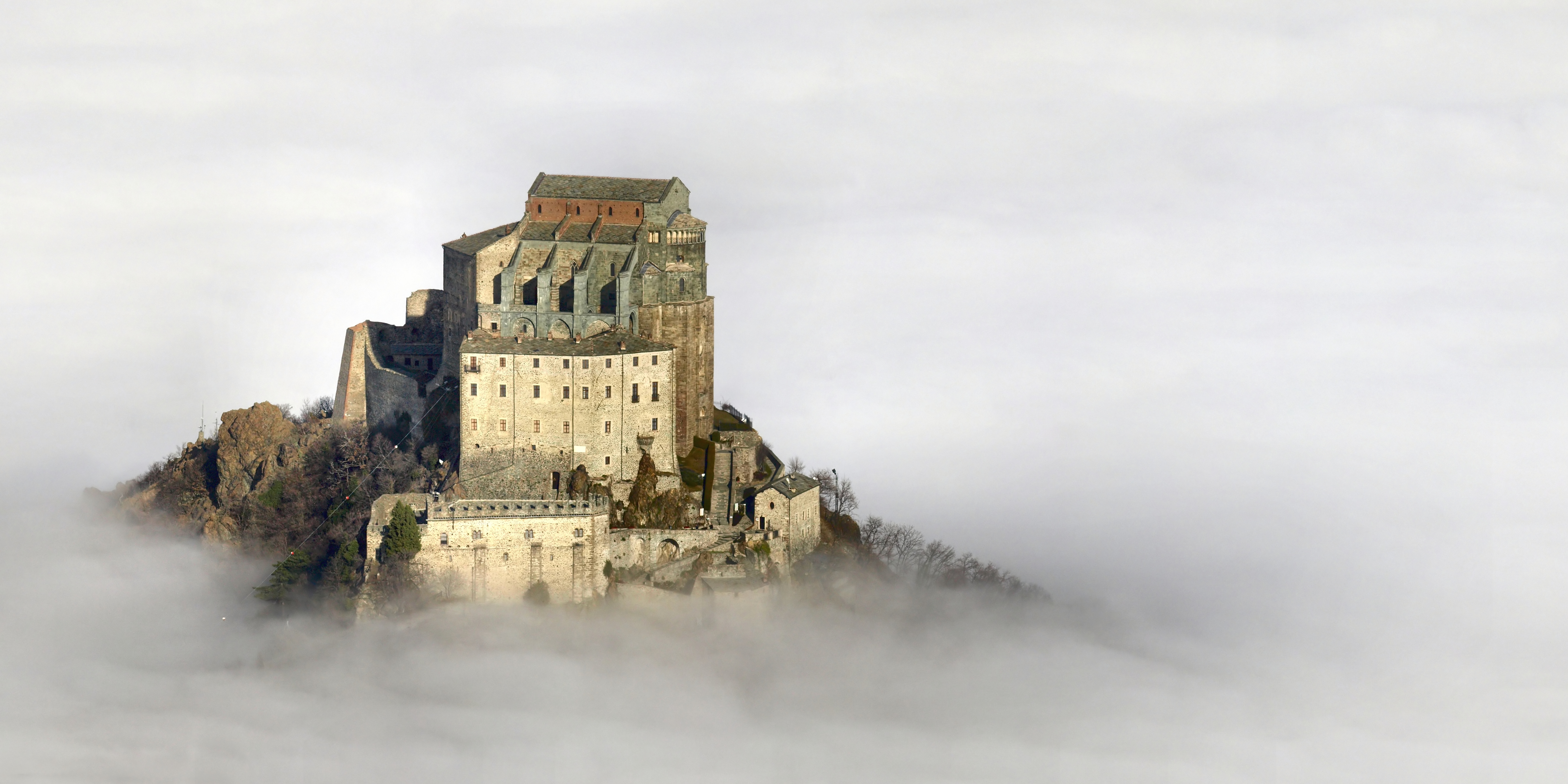
- Saint Michael's Abbey
- 45°05′52.92″N 7°20′36.56″E
- Location: Mount Pirchiriano, in the municipalities of Sant'Ambrogio di Torino and Chiusa di San Michele in the Metropolitan City of Turin province, part of Italian Piedmont region
- Country: Italy
- Denomination: Roman Catholic Church
- Religious institute: Rosminians
- Website: www.sacradisanmichele.com/en/

History
- Status: Abbey
- Dedication: Saint Michael (Archangel)

Architecture
- Functional status: Active
- Style: Romanesque and later Gothic architecture
- Groundbreaking: 10th–11th century
- Completed: 13th century

Administration
- Archdiocese: Archdiocese of Turin
- Diocese: Diocese of Susa

The Sacra di San Michele, sometimes known as Saint Michael's Abbey, is a religious complex on Mount Pirchiriano, on the south side of the Val di Susa in the municipality of Sant'Ambrogio di Torino, in the Metropolitan City of Turin, Piedmont region of northwest Italy. The abbey, which for much of its history was under Benedictine rule, is now entrusted to the Rosminians.

A special regional law calls it the "Symbolic monument of the Piedmont region". This monumental abbey served as one of the inspirations for the book The Name of the Rose by Umberto Eco.

== History ==
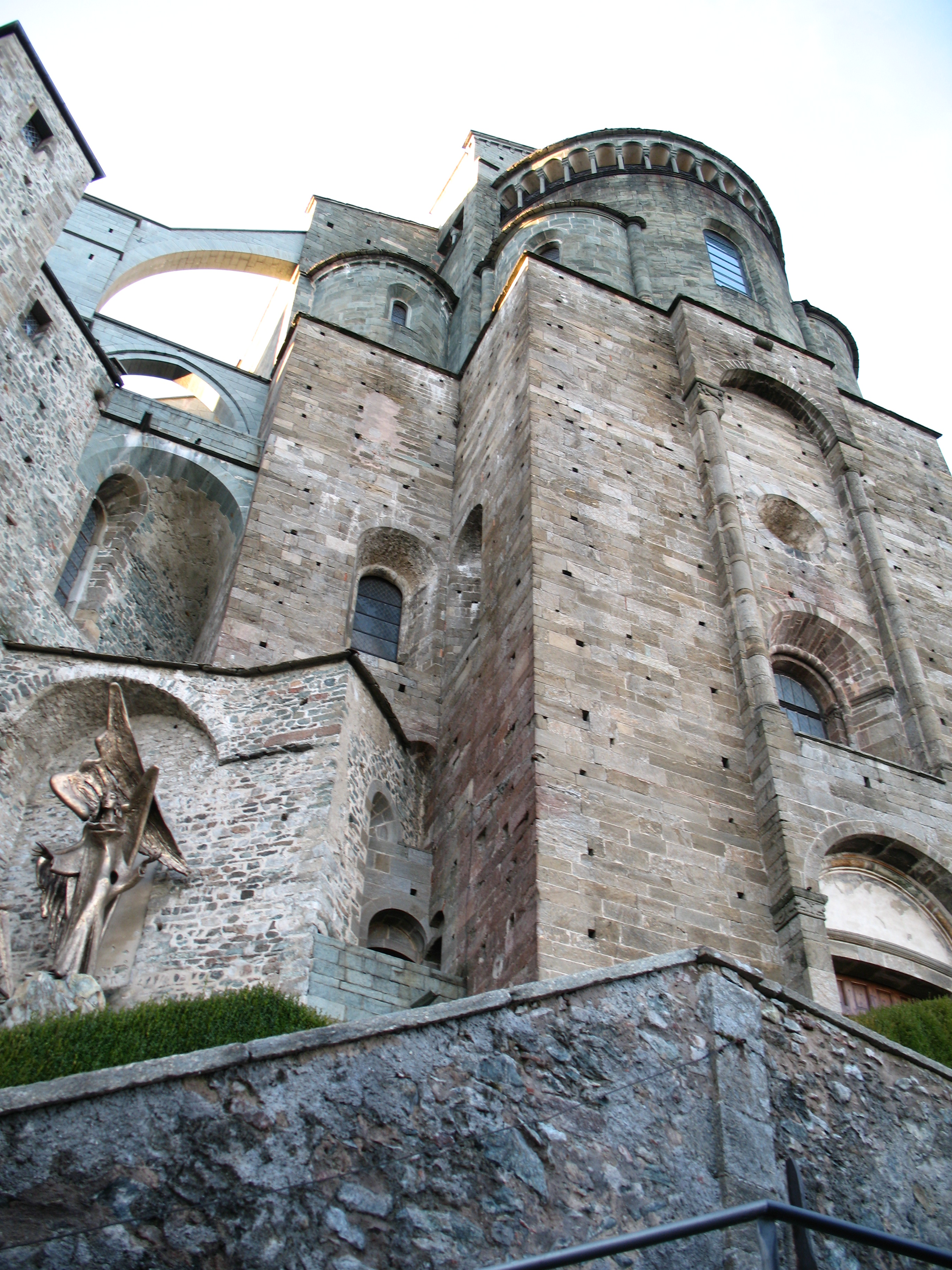
Façade of the abbey

According to some historians, in Roman times a military stronghold existed on the current location of the abbey, commanding the main road leading to Gaul from Italy. Later, after the fall of the Western Roman Empire, the Lombards built a fortress here against the Frankish invasions.

Little is known of the early years of the abbey. The oldest extant account is that of a monk, William, who lived here in the late 11th century and wrote a Chronicon Coenobii Sancti Michaelis de Clusa. He sets the foundation of the abbey in 966, but, in another passage, the same monk maintains that the construction began under the papacy of Sylvester II (999–1003).

What is now the crypt was built in the late 10th century, as attested by the Byzantine influence in the niches, columns and arches. According to tradition, this building was constructed by the hermit Saint John Vincent former Archbishop of Ravenna, at the behest of the archangel Michael to whom he was particularly devoted; and the building materials which the hermit had collected were transported miraculously to the top of the mountain. In addition, it is noted that the cult of St. Michael, the archangel who warred with Lucifer, typically bases its churches on pinnacles or hard-to-reach places, for example, Mont Saint-Michel in France.

In the following years, a small edifice was added, which could house a small community of monks and some pilgrims.

Later the abbey developed under the Benedictine rule, with the construction of a separate building with guest rooms for pilgrims following the popular Via Francigena and of a church-monastery (1015–1035), probably on the remains of the ancient Roman castrum. During Easter in 1098, St Anselm, Archbishop of Canterbury, visited the monastery to see his nephew Anselm, who was a brother there. The younger Anselm later served as abbot of St Saba in Rome and Bury St Edmunds in England. Abbot Ermengardo (1099–1131) had a new large, 26 metres (85 ft)-high basement built from the foot of the hill to its peak, on which a new church (the current one) was added, including the surrounding structures.

In the year 1315, the manuscript Breviary of San Michele della Chiusa was written containing the prayer cycle of the year for the monks of the Abbey.

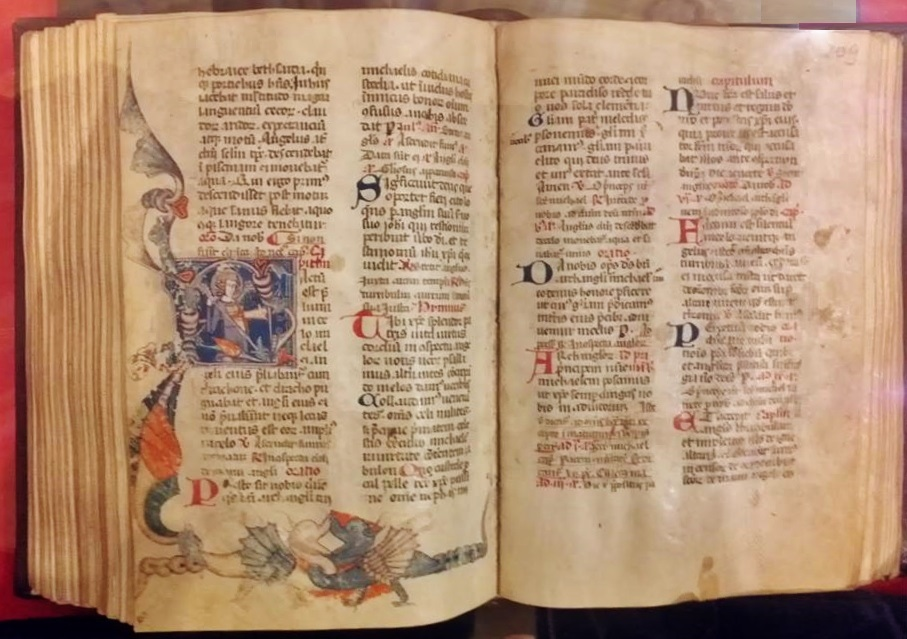
The Breviary of San Michele della Chiusa (1315) page with thumbnail.

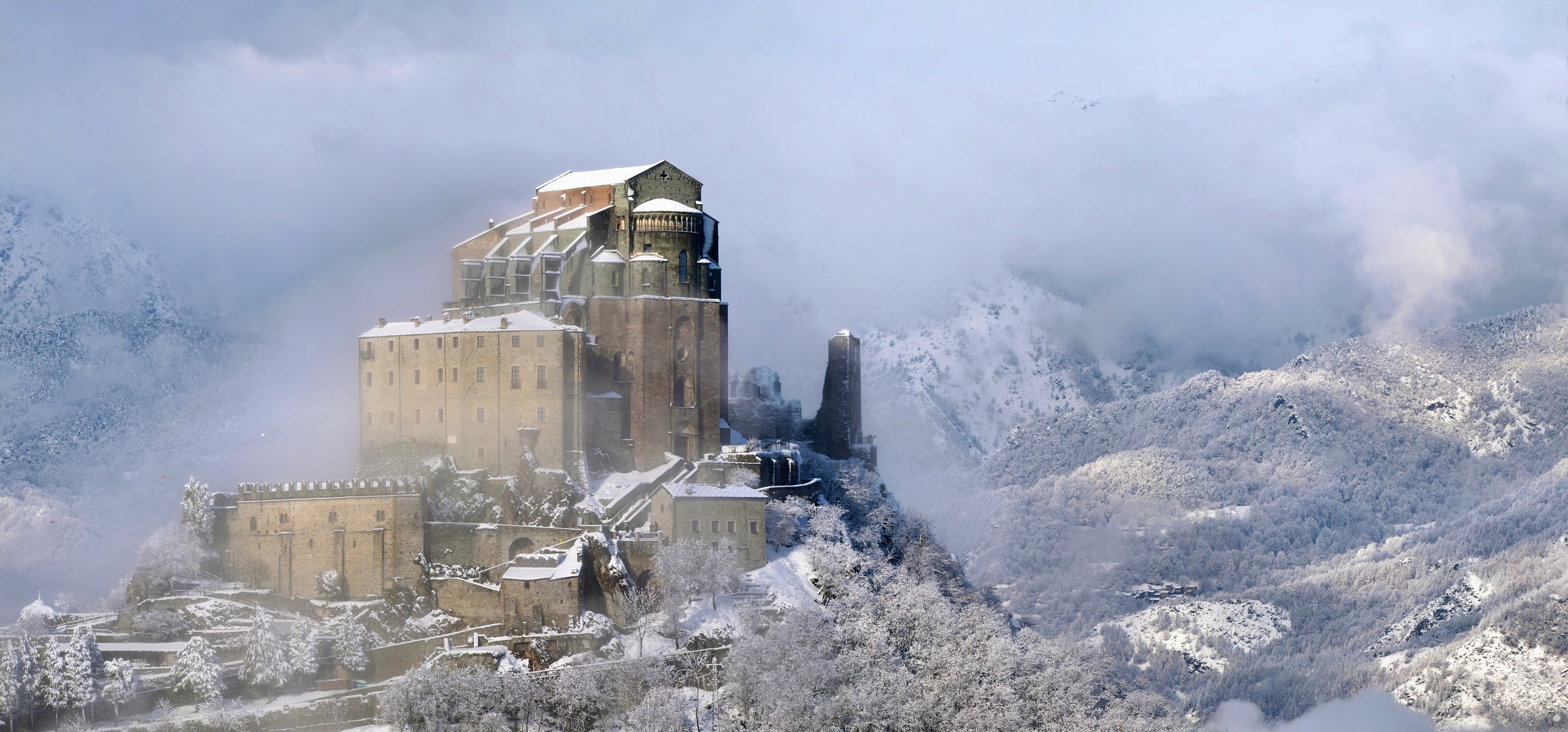
Sacra di San Michele in 2015

The monastery fell into decline and was finally suppressed in 1622 by Pope Gregory XV. It remained abandoned until 1835, when King Charles Albert and the Pope asked Antonio Rosmini to restore and repopulate it. It is currently under the care of the Rosminians.

== Art and architecture ==
The church is located atop a rocky crag base and towers above the valley. The church façade leads to a staircase, the Scalone dei Morti ("Stairway of the Dead"), flanked by arches, niches and tombs in which, until recent times, skeletons of dead monks were visible (hence the name). At the top of the 243 steps is the marble Porta dello Zodiaco, a masterwork of 12th-century sculpture. The church itself is accessed by a Romanesque portal in grey and green stone, built in the early 11th century. The church has a nave and two aisles and features elements of Gothic and Romanesque architecture. On the left wall is a large fresco portraying the Annunciation (1505), while in the Old Choir is a triptych by Defendente Ferrari.

The complex includes the ruins of the 12th–15th centuries monastery, which had five floors. It ends with the Torre della Bell'Alda ("Tower of the Beautiful Alda"). The so-called "Monks' Sepulchre" is probably the remains of a chapel reproducing, in its octagonal plan, the Holy Sepulchre of Jerusalem.

== Abbots ==
=== Elected abbots ===
From its foundation until 1380, the abbey had 27 monks elected abbot:

- Advertus (999–1002), from the Abbey of Lézat
- Benedict I (1002–1045)
- Peter I (1045–1066)
- Benedict II (1066–1091), from the Abbey of Saint-Hilaire
- William I (1091–1095)
- Ermenegald (1095–1124)
- Gaufridus (1124–1142)
- Boniface I (1142–1148)
- Stephen (1148–1170)
- Benedict III (1170–1200)
- Peter II (1200–1227)
- Elias (1227–1239)
- Matthew (1239–1244)
- William II (1244–1261), from the House of La Chambre
- Decanus (1261–1283)
- Raymond (1283–1292)
- Richard (1292–1298), from the House of Chevron Villette
- Andrew (1298–1308)
- Anthony (1308–1310)
- William III (1310–1325), son of Thomas III of Piedmont
- Rodolfo di Mombello (1325–1359)
- Ugone di Marbosco (1359–1361)
- Giacomo (1361–1362)
- Pierre de Fongeret (1362–1379)

=== Commendatary abbots ===
From 1381 to 1826 the abbey was served by 26 abbots in commendam:

- Guido di Saorgio (1381–1391)
- Guillaume de Challant (1391–1408), bishop
- Amédée de Montmayeur (1408–1411), bishop
- Antoine de Challant (1411–1421), cardinal
- Jean Seyturier (1421–1446), counsellor of Amadeus VIII of Savoy
- Guillaume de Varax (1446–1461), bishop
- Jean de Varax (1461–1503), bishop
- Urbain de Miolans (1503–1522), bishop
- Giovanni Battista Pallavicino (1522–1535), cardinal
- Bonifacio Ferrero (1535–1535), cardinal
- Filiberto Ferrero (1535–1538), cardinal
- Pier Francesco Ferrero (1538–1549), cardinal
- Filiberto Ferrero (1549–1560), cardinal (second time)
- Guido Luca Ferrero (1560–1585), cardinal
- Michele Bonelli (1585–1598), cardinal
- Lorenzo Capris (1598–1603), nobleman
- Emmanuel Philibert of Savoy (1603–1604), nobleman
- Giovanni Botero (1604–1611), presbyter
- Maurice of Savoy (1611–1642), cardinal
- Anthony of Savoy (1642–1698), military commander
- Eugene of Savoy (1698–1736), military commander
  - vacant (1736–1742)
- Giovanni Giacomo Millo (1742–1757), cardinal
  - vacant (1757–1759)
- Carlo Alberto Guidobono Cavalchini (1759–1774), cardinal
  - vacant (1774–1777)
- Giacinto Sigismondo Gerdil (1777–1818), cardinal
- Cesare Garretti dei Conti di Ferrere (1818–1826), nobleman
- Giuseppe Cacherano dei Conti di Bricherasio (1826), nobleman

=== Rosminian rectors ===
- Andrea Alotto (1943–1946, 1951–1984)
- Angelo Giupponi (1984–1990)
- Antonio Salvatori (1990–2003)
- Giuseppe Bagattini (2003–2018)
- Claudio Massimiliano Papa (since 2018)
