= Guido Luca Ferrero =

16th-century Italian Roman Catholic bishop and cardinal

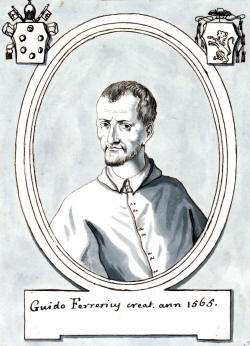
Guido Luca Ferrero

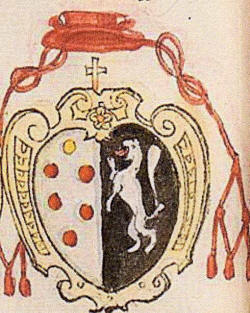
Coat of arms of Cardinal Guido Luca Ferrero

Guido Luca Ferrero (18 May 1537 – 16 May 1585) was an Italian Roman Catholic bishop and cardinal.

== Biography ==
Guido Luca Ferrero was born in Turin on 18 May 1537, the son of Sebastiano Ferrero, signore of Casalvolone and Villata, and his wife Maddalena Borromeo, daughter of Federico Borromeo, 6th count of Arona and a member of the House of Borromeo. He was the grand-nephew of Cardinals Gianstefano Ferrero and Bonifacio Ferrero; the nephew of Cardinals Filiberto Ferrero and Pier Francesco Ferrero; and the cousin of Cardinal Charles Borromeo.

He was educated by his uncle Cardinal Pier Francesco Ferrero. He spoke Latin and Greek well.

In 1559, he became a domestic prelate and a referendary of the Apostolic Signatura. In 1560 he was appointed Abbot commendatory of S. Michele di Chiusa. He was also Abbot of S. Michele in Gaviano, where he founded a seminario in 1571. From 1570 to 1585 Guido Ferrero was Prior of Chamonix.

He was elected Bishop of Vercelli on 2 March 1562 and he was subsequently consecrated as a bishop. In his episcopal capacity he participated in the XXV Session of the Council of Trent. In 1564, he became nuncio to the Republic of Venice.

Pope Pius IV made him a cardinal deacon in the consistory of 12 March 1565. He participated in the papal conclave of 1565–66 that elected Pope Pius V. He received the red hat and the deaconry of Sant'Eufemia (a titular church declared a deaconry pro illa vice) on 8 February 1566. On 6 March 1566 he opted for the deaconry of Santi Vito, Modesto e Crescenzia. He participated in the papal conclave of 1572 that elected Pope Gregory XIII. He resigned the government of the Diocese of Vercelli sometime before 17 October 1572, and was given in exchange the Monastery of S. Silvestro di Nonantola, near Modena (1573–1582).

He was governor of Spoleto from 1572 to 1578. He became Prior of Santa Maria di Pellionex in 1572, and provost of San Martino degli Umiliati, Vercelli in 1575. On 25 October 1581 he was appointed papal legate in Romagna. He was named Governor of Faenza ca. 1583. He participated in the papal conclave of 1585 that elected Pope Sixtus V.

Cardinal Guido owned the Villa Ruffinella in Frascati from 1578 to 1585. On 10 May 1585 he donated the villa (reserving lifetime tenancy) to a college of scholars which he had founded in Torino. He also was the possessor of the remains of the Baths of Constantine, where later was built the Consulta and the Palazzo Pallavicini-Rospigliosi.

He died in Rome on 16 May 1585. He was buried in the Basilica di Santa Maria Maggiore.
