= San Giovanni Vincenzo, Sant'Ambrogio di Torino =

Church building in Sant'Ambrogio di Torino, Italy

Coordinates: 45°05′57″N 7°21′23″E

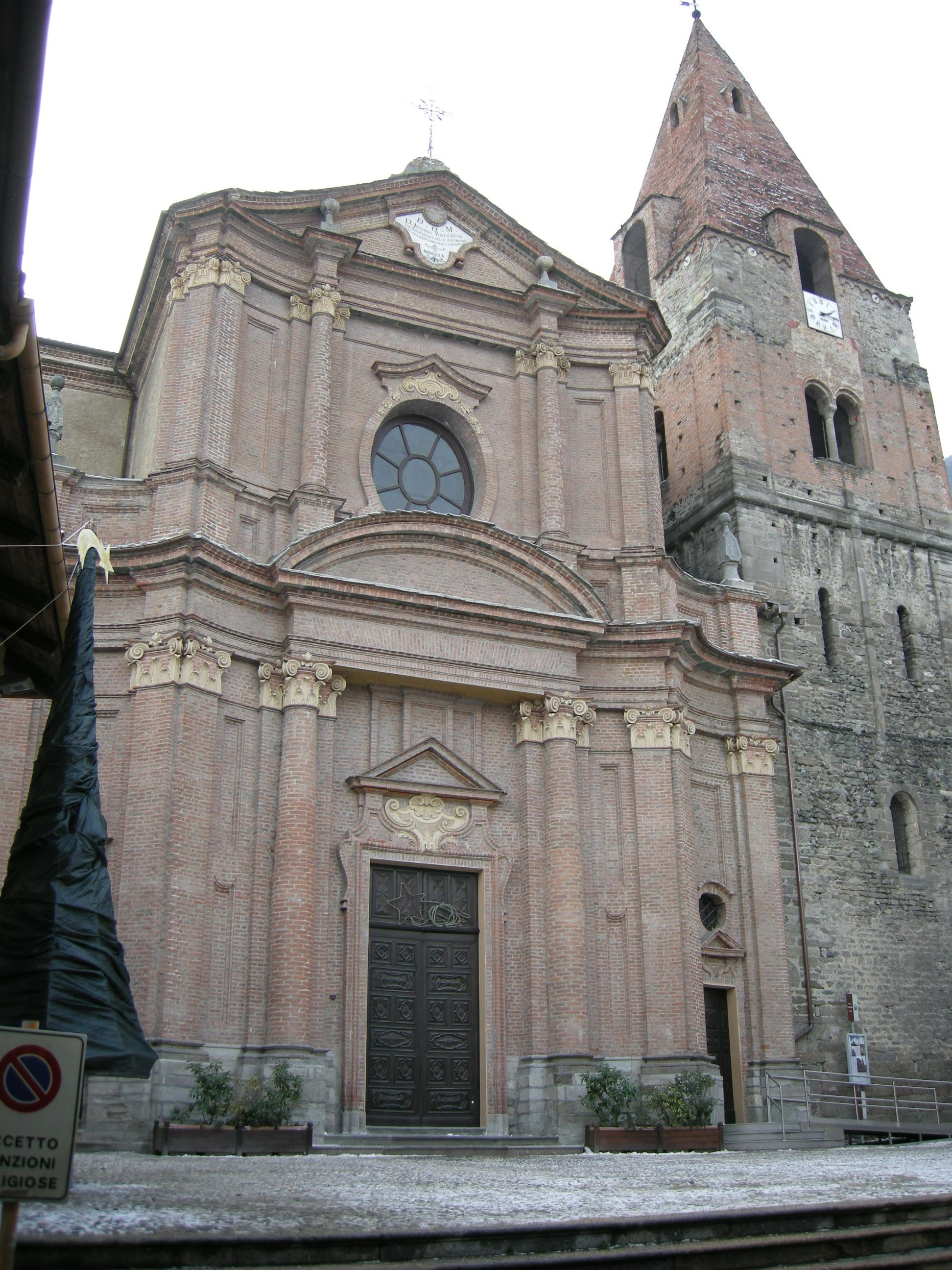
Facade and bell-tower

San Giovanni Vincenzo (Saint John Vincent) is a late-Baroque style, Roman Catholic parish church located in the town of Sant'Ambrogio di Torino, in the Metropolitan City of Turin in the region of Piedmont, Italy. The church was designed by the Piedmontese architect Bernardo Vittone.

== History and description ==
A church at the site was present since the 11th century, allied to the Abbey of San Michele della Chiusa. The present building derives from a reconstruction started after 1755 under the designs of Vittone. The stout brick and stone bell-tower is the only remnant from the prior Romanesque structures.

The facade of the church is concave, a common motif in Vittone churches. The short single nave ends in an apse with elegant 19th-century medallion decorations by Luigi Morgari. The church houses a reliquary for the remains of the titular saint, a hermit and founder of the abbey of San Michele della Chiusa. The main altarpiece depicts a Madonna and child with Saints Ambrose and Giovanni Vincenzo attributed to Michele Antonio Milocco. Another altarpiece in the Chapel of the Rosary, depicts the Madonna del Rosario and Dominican Saints (1782) by Giovanni Domenico Molinari. The Via Crucis (1783) were made by Vittorio Amedeo Rapous; The Apostolate (1774-75) painted by Agostino Verano; and another Madonna del Rosario is attributed to Bernardino Lanino.
