= Warmund =

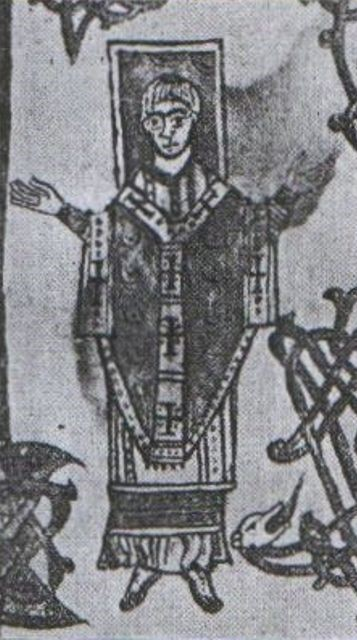
Warmund depicted with a square halo in his sacramentary

Warmund, in Latin Warmundus (died 1002×1011), was the bishop of Ivrea from about 966 until his death. Warmund is the namesake of the so-called Warmund Sacramentary, an illustrated manuscript produced for him around the year 1000.

Nothing is known with certainty of Warmund's early life, although his birth has been estimated to fall around 930. The historian Luigi Moreno is responsible for much of the unfounded speculation that surrounds Warmund's family and education: that he adopted the surname of the Arborio family of Vercelli, where he first studied letters, and subsequently studied canon law at either Bologna or Pavia.

It is also uncertain when Warmund became bishop. His first recorded act was signing the canons of the synod of Milan in absentia in November 969, but he was probably consecrated as bishop on Sunday, 7 March 966. In the eleventh century, a scribe added the note that "Warmund is consecrated bishop" beside the Nonas marcii ("nones [i.e., the 7th] of March") in the calendar preface to a ninth-century copy of the Martyrology of Ado. Although no year is given, the year can be deduced from the fact that bishops were consecrated on Sundays and the last nones of March to fall on a Sunday before the synod of Milan was in 966. Bishop Luigi Bettazzi of Ivrea, in his commentary on the Warmund Sacramentary, suggested that Warmund was "of German birth", appointed bishop by the Emperor Otto I in order to secure Ivrea's loyalty to the Italo-German empire Otto was forging. The name Warmund, which means "mouth of truth" in German, was widely used in Germany in the 10th century.

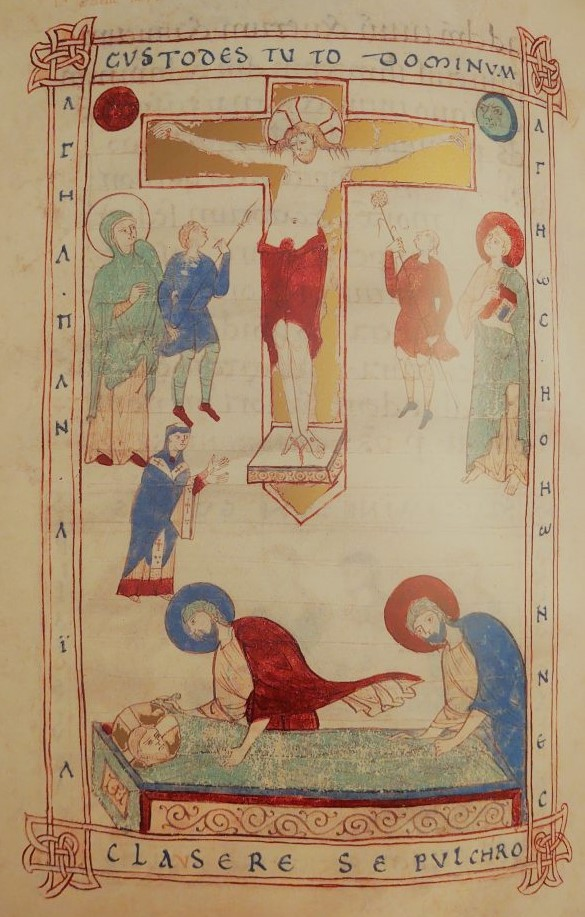
Warmund is depicted as a bishop below and to the left of the cross in the crucifixion scene from his sacramentary

Warmund's activity between 969 and 996 is undocumented, but he was probably occupied in the 980s with the rebuilding of the cathedral of Ivrea. A contemporary inscription on a stone tablet built into the choir records that "Bishop Warmund built this from the ground up". Besides the choir, he also constructed twin bell towers to house the new larger bells. He also performed work on the ambulatory and crypt, and it is probably in connexion with his renovations that he commissioned the scriptorium to produce a sacramentary and other texts for the new altars.

From 996 to 998, Warmund was forced from his see by the margrave of Ivrea, Arduin, over land disputes. In 999, Peter, the bishop of Vercelli, was killed when Arduin's men besieged his town and burned down his church with him and his canons inside. This provoked Warmund to excommunicate Arduin, an action which is well documented in the books Warmund commissioned. The sermon Warmund preached threatening Arduin with excommunication has been preserved, as have the actual excommunication formula as pronounced in the cathedral, a letter from Warmund to Pope Gregory V explaining the situation, the pope's letter to Arduin and the public condemnation of Arduin by Pope Sylvester II and the Emperor Otto III during an Easter synod at Rome in the year 1000. Warmund was probably present at this synod. On 9 July 1000, the Emperor Otto III confirmed in a diploma that the city of Ivrea belonged to the jurisdiction of the bishop.

According to Jean-Claude Schmitt, Warmund's sacramentary is of great importance for the study of medieval mourning and burial practices.

Warmund disappears from the record after 1002. The French historian Pierre-Alain Mariaux has argued that he died on 1 August of some year between 1002 and 1006, but the Italian historian Adriano Peroni places his death in 1011. Warmund was beatified on 17 September 1857 at the insistence of Bishop Luigi Moreno of Ivrea, who also published (anonymously) a biography of Warmund in 1858. His feast is celebrated on 13 November with the other bishop-saints of Ivrea.

== Sources ==
- Arnaldi, Girolamo (1962). "Arduino, re d'Italia". Dizionario Biografico degli Italiani. Vol. 4. Rome: Istituto dell'Enciclopedia Italiana.
- Gatti, Evan A. (2010). "In a Space Between: Ivrea and the Problem of (Italian) Ottonian Art". Peregrinations: A Journal for the International Society for the Study of Pilgrimage Art. 3 (1): 8–48.
- Geary, Patrick J. (1994). Phantoms of Remembrance: Memory and Oblivion at the End of the First Millennium. Princeton, N.J.: Princeton University Press.
- Mackie, Gillian (2010). "Warmundus of Ivrea and Episcopal Attitudes to Death, Martyrdom and the Millennium". Papers of the British School at Rome. 78: 219–63. doi:10.1017/S0068246200000878. S2CID 129223835.
- Mariaux, Pierre-Alain (2002). Warmond d'Ivrée et ses images, politique et creation iconographique autour de l'an mil. European University Studies. Bern.
- Saroglia, Giovanni (1881). Memorie storiche sulla chiesa d'Ivrea. Ivrea.
