= Sant'Ambrogio sul Garigliano =

- Comune
- Comune di Sant'Ambrogio sul Garigliano
- Location within Italy Location within Lazio
- Coordinates: 41°23′N 13°52′E
- Country: Italy
- Region: Lazio
- Province: Frosinone (FR)

Government
  - Mayor: Sergio Messore

Area
  - Total: 9.0 km^{2} (3.5 sq mi)
- Elevation: 137 m (449 ft)

Population (28 February 2017)
  - Total: 968
  - Density: 110/km^{2} (280/sq mi)
- Demonym: Ambrosiani
- Time zone: UTC+1 (CET)
  - Summer (DST): UTC+2 (CEST)
- Postal code: 03040
- Dialing code: 0776
- Website: Official website

Sant'Ambrogio sul Garigliano is a comune (municipality) in the Province of Frosinone in the Italian region Lazio, located about 130 kilometres (81 miles) southeast of Rome and about 50 km (31 mi) southeast of Frosinone.

Sant'Ambrogio sul Garigliano borders the following municipalities: Rocca d'Evandro, Sant'Andrea del Garigliano, Sant'Apollinare. During World War II, due to its position across the Gustav Line, it was mostly destroyed.

== Twin towns ==
- (Italy) Sant'Ambrogio di Torino, since 2004
- (Italy) Sant'Ambrogio di Valpolicella, since 2004
