= 1565–1566 conclave =

Election of Catholic Pope Pius V

Papal conclave 1565–66

Dates and location
- 20 December 1565 – 7 January 1566; Apostolic Palace, Papal States

Key officials
- Dean: Francesco Pisani
- Sub-dean: Giovanni Morone
- Camerlengo: Vitellozzo Vitelli
- Protopriest: Georges d'Armagnac
- Protodeacon: Giulio della Rovere

Elected pope
- Antonio Ghislieri; Name taken: Pius V
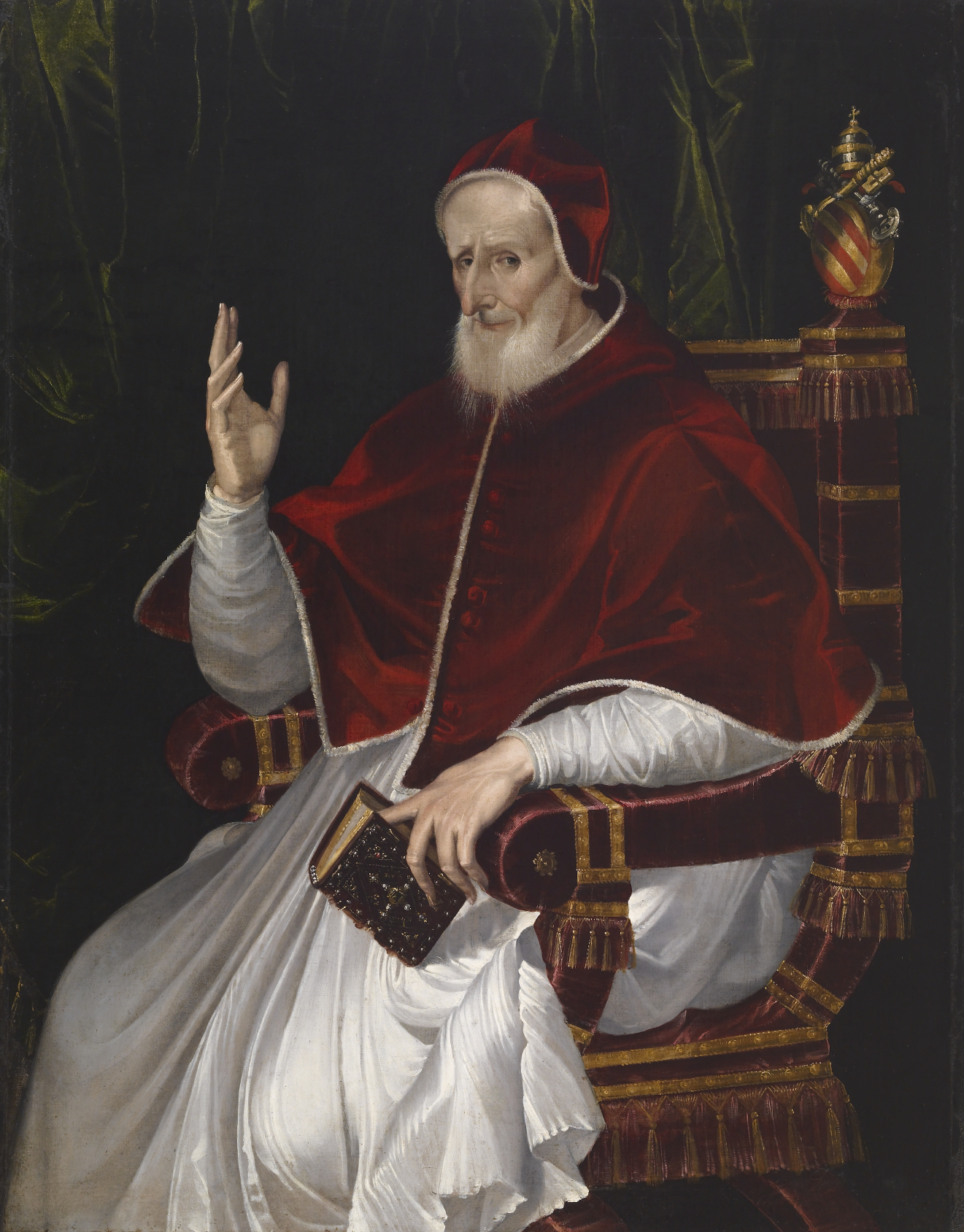

The 1565–66 papal conclave (20 December – 7 January) was convened on the death of Pope Pius IV and ended in the election of Pope Pius V.

== Background ==
Cardinal Vitellozzo Vitelli was Camerlengo; Cardinal Francesco Pisani, the most senior of the cardinals was Dean of the Sacred College. The conclave was made up of several small groups aligned either by family relations, such as those who favored Francesco Gonzaga; and by locale, such as the Florentines. A separate division lay between some of the younger cardinals eager to press the reforms of the Council of Trent, and their senior colleagues whose views of reform leaned towards the Inquisition, which use appeared sometimes to border on the political.

The various factions presented a difficulty for anyone trying to put together a two-thirds majority. Cardinal Farnese had the largest number of commitments, but not the thirty-five needed to elect. Cardinal Borromeo advised Farnese that while he couldn't agree to support him as a candidate, he was willing to work with him to select someone agreeable. Farnese suggested four names, including that of Antonio Ghislieri. Ghislieri was also acceptable to the Spanish. (At the emperor's request, Cosimo I of Florence was active behind the scenes, hoping to secure the title of Duke of Tuscany.) Within two hours, they had sufficient votes to elect Ghislieri.

== Cardinal Electors at the Conclave ==
Ippolito II d'Este and Guido Luca Ferrero left the conclave because of illness; Francesco Gonzaga died during the conclave on 6 January.

- Francesco Pisani (1494–1570)
- Giovanni Morone (1509–80)
- Alessandro Farnese (1520–89)
- Cristoforo Madruzzo (1512–78)
- Tiberio Crispo (1498–1566)
- Niccolò Caetani (1526–85)
- Ippolito II d'Este (1509–72)
- Giacomo Savelli (1523–87)
- Giulio della Rovere (1533–78)
- Innocenzo Ciocchi Del Monte (c1532-77)
- Fulvio Giulio della Corgna (1517–83)
- Giovanni Michele Saraceni (1498–1568)
- Giovanni Ricci (1498–1574)
- Giovanni Battista Cicala (1510–70)
- Luigi Cornaro (1517–84)
- Girolamo Simoncelli (1522–1605)
- Scipione Rebiba (1504–77)
- Jean Suau (1503–66)
- Antonio Ghislieri (1504–72)
- Clemente d'Olera (1501–68)
- Vitellozzo Vitelli (1531–68)
- Giovanni Antonio Serbelloni (1519–91)
- Charles Borromeo (1538–84)
- Ludovico Simonetta (d. 1568)
- Mark Sittich von Hohenems Altemps (1533–95)
- Francesco Gonzaga (1538–66)
- Alfonso Gesualdo (1540–1603)
- Gianfrancesco Gambara (1533–87)
- Bernardo Salviati (1508–68)
- Pier Francesco Ferrero (1510–66)
- Luigi d'Este (1538–86)
- Ludovico Madruzzo (1532–1600)
- Innico d'Avalos d'Aragona (1536–1600)
- Francisco Pacheco de Villena
- Girolamo di Corregio (1511–72)
- Ferdinando de' Medici
- Marco Antonio Colonna (1523–79)
- Tolomeo Gallio (1527–1607)
- Angelo Nicolini (1505–67)
- Luigi Pisani (1522–70)
- Zaccaria Delfino (1527–84)
- Marcantonio Bobba (d. 1575)
- Alessandro Sforza (1534–81)
- Flavio Orsini (1532–1581)
- Francesco Alciati (1522–80)
- Francesco Abbondio Castiglioni (1523–68)
- Guido Luca Ferrero (1537–85)
- Benedetto Lomellini (1517–79)
- Guglielmo Sirleto (1514–85)
- Gabriele Paleotti (1522–97)
- Francesco Crasso (1500–66)

== See also ==
- Alessandro Farnese (cardinal)#Conclave of 1566 -detailed discussion of parties and positions.
