= Filiberto Ferrero =

Italian Roman Catholic bishop and cardinal

Filiberto Ferrero (1500–1549) was an Italian Roman Catholic bishop and cardinal.

== Biography ==
Filiberto Ferrero was born in Biella in 1500, the son of Goffredo Ferrero, marquis of Bordolano, and his second wife Margherita Sanseverino, marchioness of Bordolano. He was the nephew of Cardinals Gianstefano Ferrero and Bonifacio Ferrero. His younger brother, Pier Francesco Ferrero, also later became a cardinal, as did his nephew, Guido Luca Ferrero.

On 17 May 1518 he was elected Bishop of Ivrea, serving as administrator until he reached the canonical age of 27. He occupied the see until his death. From 1528, he served as the almoner of Francis I of France. In 1530, he served as the ambassador of Charles III, Duke of Savoy to the Republic of Venice. On 12 November 1532 Pope Clement VII named him nuncio to the Duke of Savoy. He was consecrated as a bishop in Rome by his uncle Cardinal Bonifacio Ferrero on 28 December 1533. From 26 April 1537 until 11 March 1541, he was nuncio to Francis I of France.

Pope Paul III made him a cardinal priest in the consistory of April 8, 1549. He received the red hat and the titular church of San Vitale on 10 May 1549.

He died in Rome on 14 August 1549. He was buried in the family's tomb in Biella.
