= Ivrea Cathedral =

Church building in Italy

- Duomo di Ivrea (Italian)
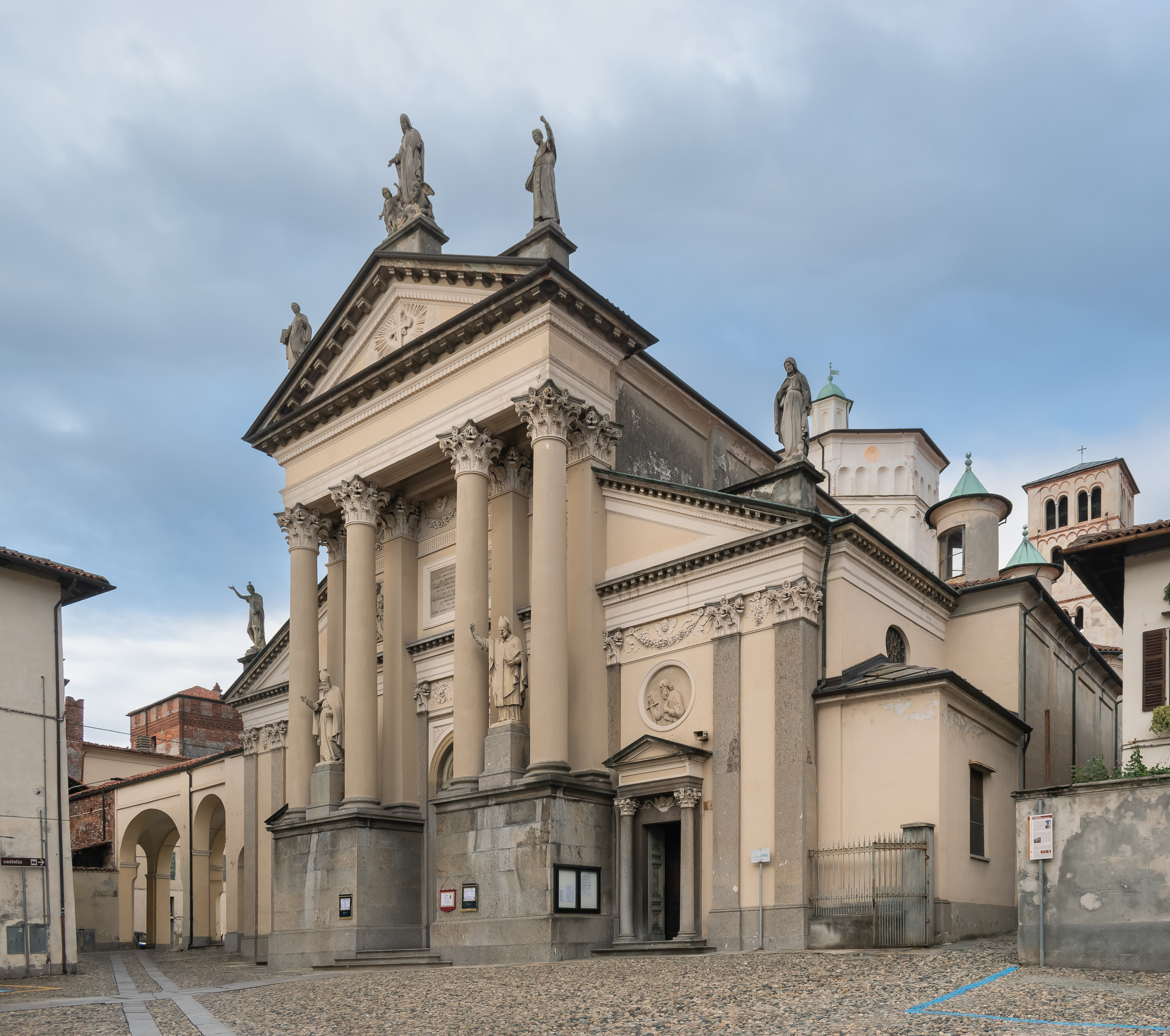
- The façade
- Click on the map for a fullscreen view
- 45°28′05.09″N 7°52′30.86″E
- Country: Italy
- Denomination: Roman Catholic

Architecture
- Functional status: Active
- Style: Romanesque architecture

Administration
- Diocese: Diocese of Ivrea

Ivrea Cathedral is a Roman Catholic church located in Ivrea, Italy.

== History ==
The church was first built towards the end of the 4th century, when it presumably replaced an earlier Roman temple.

Bishop Warmund, who held the episcopal seat of Ivrea from 969 to 1005, decided to undertake a campaign to enlarge the church. Thus, the cathedral was rebuilt in the Romanesque style, with works achieving completion in the 12th century.

The Cathedral was served by a Chapter of Canons, which was headed by three dignities, the Provost, the Archdeacon, and the Archpriest. The Chapter had a set of statutes as early as 1247, which were emended and extended in 1255, 1260, 1263 and 1265. Pope Julius II confirmed another set of Statutes in 1508. Another set was enacted in 1694. In 1698 there were five dignities and nineteen Canons.

In an Imperial Decree of 6 May 1806, the Emperor Bonaparte ordered that the Chapter of Ivrea consolidate all of the property of its prebends into a single fund, and apportion the dividends to each of the Canons on an equal basis. In a decree of 8 May 1806, he consolidated (i.e. suppressed) the Collegiate Churches of Castelnuovo di Scrivia, Csteggio, Cavaglià, Livorno, Masserano, and S. Benigno, uniting them with the Cathedral.

After the Congress of Vienna restored Piedmont to the Dukes of Savoy (Kings of Sardinia), an effort was made to restore some of the property that had belonged to the Cathedral, but what was recovered was insufficient to support the Chapter of the Cathedral. Pope Pius VII therefore issued a bull on 17 July 1817 which reduced the number to five dignities and sixteen Canons. In addition there was a Penitentiary and six Chaplains.

== Description ==
The church is located in the highest area of Ivrea, close to the Ivrea Episcopal Palace, to which it is connected through a covered walkway, and the Ivrea Castle. It features a Neoclassical façade.

=== Architecture ===
The cathedral is built on the site of a first century Roman temple. Between the fourth and fifth century, a Christian church was constructed in the design of a Roman basilica. In the eleventh century, Bishop Warmondo, who was named bishop by Emperor Otto III, enlarged the structure in the Romanesque style. Warmondo also established a scriptorium. As the apse and other portions of Warmondo's work remains, the cathedral constitutes an important example of Romanesque architecture in the Canavese.

The campanili are attributed to the early 11th century, though the upper parts which house the bells were not completed until two hundred years later. The upper portions of the bell towers, that may have collapsed during the 1117 Verona earthquake, began to be rebuilt in the 12th century.

In 1516 Bishop Bonafacio Ferrero replaced the Romanesque façade with a Bramante-style portico. Bishop Ottavio Pocchettini (1824–1837) later commissioned architect Giuseppe Martinez to remodel the building in Late Baroque style. The Bramante-style portico was reworked into a Palladian style in 1854.

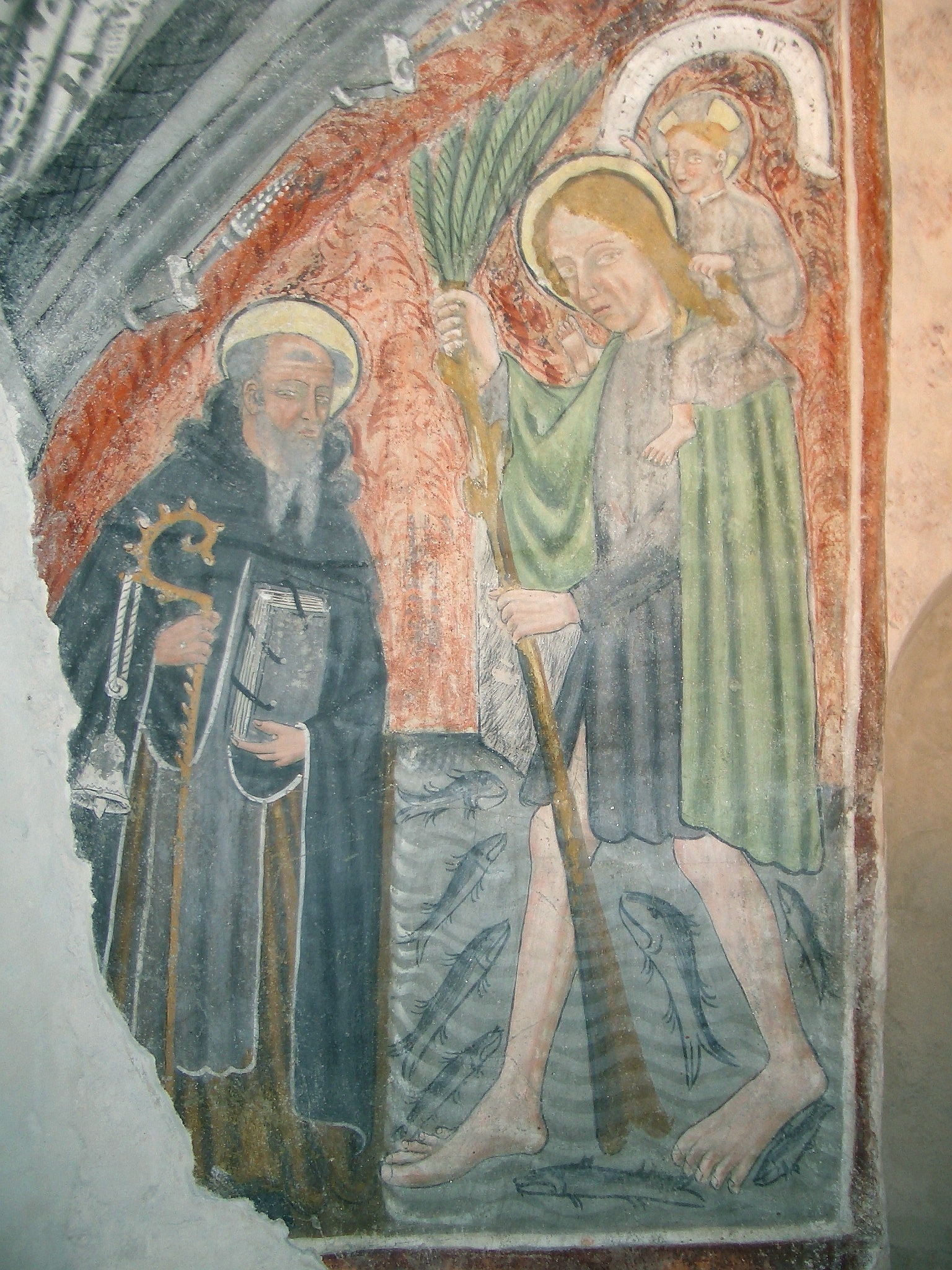
St. Christopher and St. Anthony the Abbot, Giacomo of Ivrea c. 1426

=== Art ===
The carved walnut reredos depicting motifs of plants and human and animal figures, attributed to Baldino of Surso, are now in the Civic Museum of Ancient Art in Turin. The crypt contains frescoes from the thirteenth to the fifteenth century, some damaged by time. On the foundation pillar of the southern bell tower, a holy warrior is depicted, possibly representing a member of the Theban Legion. There is also some early work by Giacomino of Ivrea and a painting attributed to the Maestro di Oropa.

In the sacristy is a 1521 depiction of the Adoration of the Child with the Blessed Warmondo and donor by Piedmont master Defendente Ferrari. A second Ferrari, the Adoration of the Child with St. Clare and the Poor Clares, was re-located to the chapter room from the former convent of Santa Chiara in Ivrea which closed in 1802.
