= Episcopal Palace, Ivrea =

Ivrea Episcopal Palace
- Palazzo del Vescovado di Ivrea (Italian)
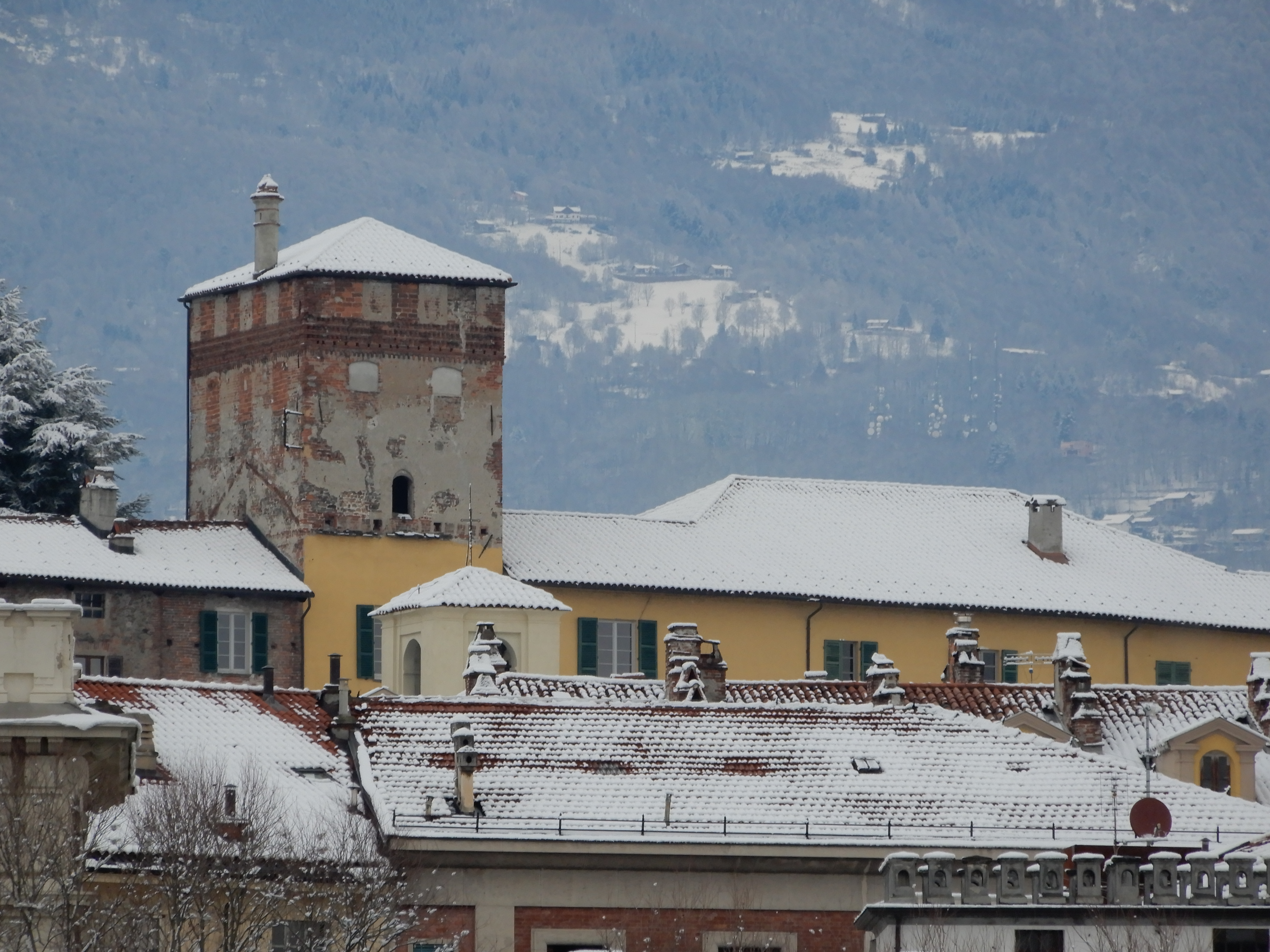
- Ivrea Episcopal Palace in 2020
- Click on the map for a fullscreen view

General information
- Location: Ivrea, Italy
- Coordinates: 45°28′03.72″N 7°52′32.51″E

The Ivrea Episcopal Palace (Italian: Palazzo del Vescovado di Ivrea) is a historic building located in Ivrea, Italy.

== History ==
The palace was formed over the centuries through successive works of expansion, renovation, and stratification. Although it is possible to discern structures dating back to Roman times, such as in the foundations, the core of the building is medieval, probably originating as a fortified house, as evidenced by its imposing tower dating from the 15th century.

== Description ==
The palace stands on the top of the hill upon which the historic center of Ivrea is built. It is located very close to the Ivrea Castle and the Ivrea Cathedral, to which it is directly connected by a covered walkway.

The large hall located on main floor is decorated with frescoes covering all four walls and depicting the territory of the diocese. Some studies conducted on the frescoes suggest that they were created around the mid-18th century.
