= Sant'Apollinare =

- Comune
- Comune di Sant'Apollinare
- Location within Italy Location within Lazio
- Coordinates: 41°24′N 13°50′E
- Country: Italy
- Region: Lazio
- Province: Frosinone (FR)

Government
  - Mayor: Enzo Scittarelli

Area
  - Total: 17.0 km^{2} (6.6 sq mi)
- Elevation: 51 m (167 ft)

Population (28 February 2017)
  - Total: 1,883
  - Density: 111/km^{2} (287/sq mi)
- Demonym: Santapollinaresi
- Time zone: UTC+1 (CET)
  - Summer (DST): UTC+2 (CEST)
- Postal code: 03048
- Dialing code: 0776
- Website: Official website

Sant'Apollinare (locally Santapunaro or Santapunare) is a comune (municipality) in the Province of Frosinone in the Italian region Lazio, located about 120 kilometres (75 mi) southeast of Rome and about 50 kilometres (31 mi) southeast of Frosinone.

Sant'Apollinare borders the following municipalities: Cassino, Pignataro Interamna, Rocca d'Evandro, San Giorgio a Liri, Sant'Ambrogio sul Garigliano, Sant'Andrea del Garigliano, Vallemaio.

The town originated in 797, when Gisulf, abbot of Montecassino, created here a small monastic community. In the Middle Ages it had a castle commanding the Liri-Garigliano valley, now in ruins. It became part of the Lazio region in 1927. Due to its position across the Gustav Line, during World War II it suffered relevant destructions.
