= Francesco Crasso =

Italian cardinal

- Born: 1500; Milan
- Died: 1566 (aged 65–66); Rome

Francesco Crasso (1500–1566) was an Italian Roman Catholic cardinal.

== Biography ==
Francesco Crasso was born in Milan in 1500, the son of Pietro Antonio Crasso, a Milanese noble related to the signoria of Zibido San Giacomo and Lambro. He was from a Neapolitan patrician family. He was educated in Milan, becoming a doctor of both laws.

On December 28, 1535, he became a member of the Senate of Milan. He became president of the Magistrato delle entrate in 1548. He was a counselor of Philip II of Spain, who held the title of Duke of Milan. He became governor of Siena and Cremona. He was the ambassador of the Duchy of Milan to Charles V, Holy Roman Emperor. Crasso was married and had several children.

After the death of his wife, he moved to Rome, where his good friend Pope Pius IV made him a protonotary apostolic participantium. He also became a referendary of the Apostolic Signatura. On January 5, 1565, the pope named him governor of Bologna.

Upon the suggestion of Charles Borromeo, Pope Pius IV made Crasso a cardinal deacon in the consistory of March 12, 1565. On October 26, 1565, he opted for the order of cardinal priests. He participated in the papal conclave of 1565-66 that elected Pope Pius V. He received the red hat and the titular church of Santa Lucia in Septisolio (a deaconry raised to the status of title pro illa vice) on February 8, 1566. On March 6, 1566, he opted for the titular church of Sant'Euphemia.

He died in Rome on August 29, 1566. He was buried in the Franciscan church of Santa Maria della Pace in Milan.
