= Breviary of San Michele della Chiusa =

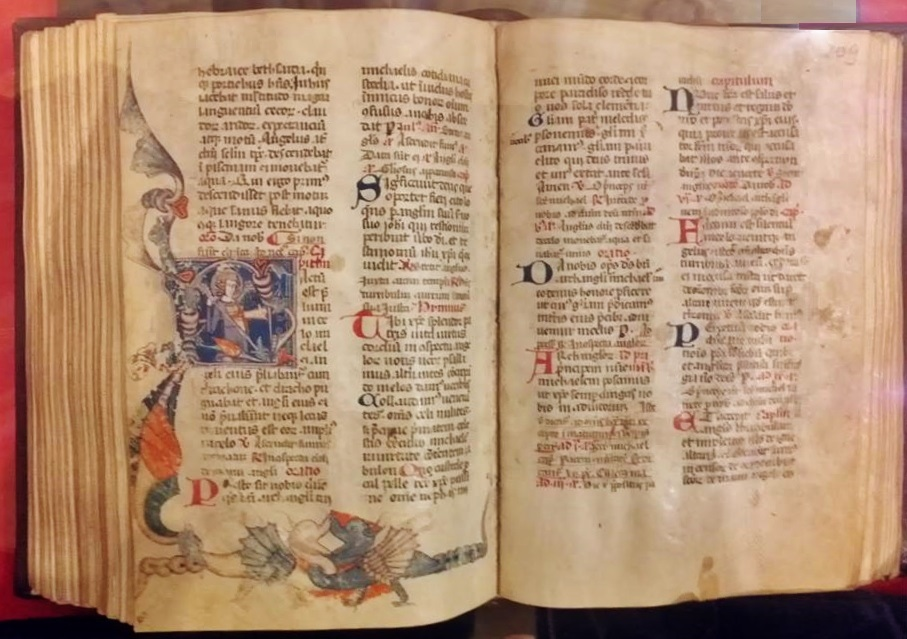
The Breviary of San Michele della Chiusa (1315) page with thumbnail.

The Breviary of San Michele della Chiusa is a manuscript liturgical book of 1315 in two volumes: the "Santorale" and the "Temporale" for a total of 1390 pages.

== History ==
It has been used for at least three centuries in the cycle of daily prayer at the Monastery of Sacra di San Michele.

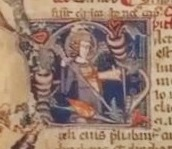
The Breviary of San Michele della Chiusa (1315): detail of the miniature depicting Saint Michael.

After the dispersion of the library of the Sacra di San Michele, at the beginning of the nineteenth century, the breviary was regained on the market by a wealthy donor who gave it to the Parish of San Giovanni Vincenzo in Sant'Ambrogio di Torino, which has been responsible for its conservation ever since.

== Studies and insights ==
In the last quarter of the twentieth century several scholars deepened specific studies on the Breviary of St. Michael, and in particular the works conducted by Costanza Segre Montel, Giacomo Baroffio and Gian Mario Pasquino who resumed the entire Latin text translating it into Italian and studying the Gregorian melodies. In 1995 the results of these works were published in the volume: Il Millennio Composito di San Michele della Chiusa. In 1999, through a co-funded project, the breviary was digitized and proposed for dissemination through a multimedia support. The choir: "Coro Abbazia di Novalesa" began at the same time to study and sing the sacred melodies of the Breviary, spreading them to the public in numerous concerts over the years, and in the summer of 2015, on the occasion of the 700th anniversary released a music CD with 22 selected tracks of the Breviary of San Michele della Chiusa.

In the year 2015 the 700th anniversary of the Breviary was celebrated, promoted by a special commission established at the parish of San Giovanni Vincenzo in Sant'Ambrogio di Torino, which was a further opportunity to study and deepen the two texts of the Breviary and of the publications that have been written on the subject over time. A public exhibition for the 700th anniversary was held in June, July and September 2015, and on 14 November 2015 a study conference with European experts presented the latest studies on the Breviary of San Michele della Chiusa. At the conclusion of this cycle of events on 21 November 2015, the day of the liturgical feast of San Giovanni Vincenzo, the "Coro Abbazia di Novalesa" held at the Church of San Giovanni Vincenzo in Sant'Ambrogio di Torino the official 700th anniversary concert, with a vast repertoire of Gregorian pieces taken from the two volumes of the Breviary.

== See also ==
- Breviary
- Sacra di San Michele
