= Guillaume de Varax =

Guillaume de Varax (died April 11, 1466) was a French–Swiss bishop.

Guillaume was born to aristocratic parents, Etienne de Varax and Claudine de Saint-Amour. His father was seigneur (lord) of Romans and Saint-André-en-Bresse. He became a monk in the Order of Saint Benedict at the Abbey of Île Barbe sometime before 1440. In 1440 he became prior at Fréterive, and in 1446 abbot of Sacra di San Michele.

From 1460 to 1462, he served as Bishop of Belley, and from 1462 to his death as Bishop of Lausanne.
