= Edoardo Aldo Cerrato =

Italian Catholic bishop

His Excellency, The Most Reverend Edoardo Aldo Cerrato C.O.
- Bishop Emeritus of Ivrea
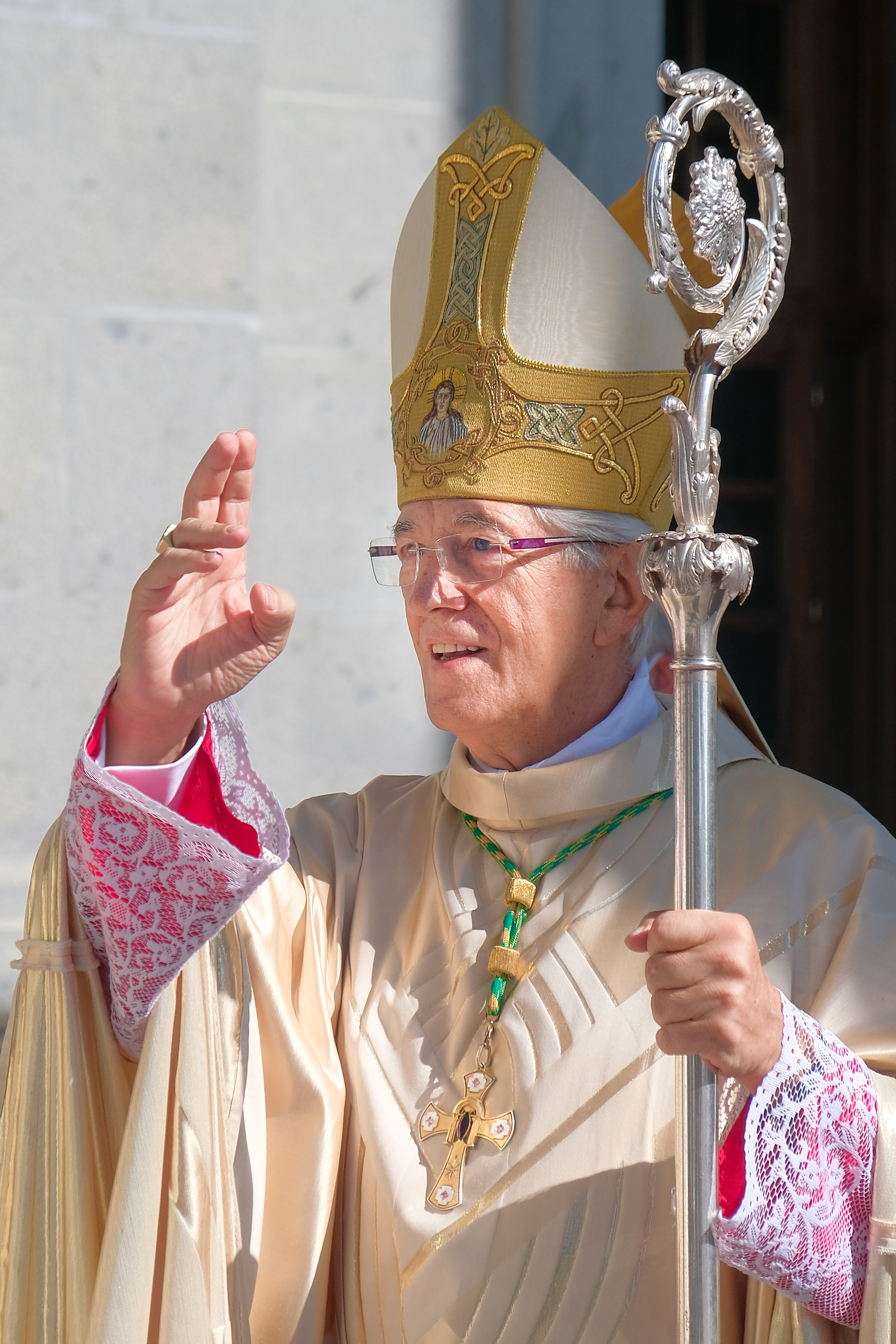
- Bishop Cerrato in 2022
- Church: Catholic Church
- Archdiocese: Turin
- Diocese: Ivrea
- Appointed: 28 July 2012
- Term ended: 16 December 2024
- Successor: Daniele Salera
- Previous post: Procurator General of the Oratory of St. Philip Neri

Orders
- Ordination: 28 June 1975 by Vittorio Piola
- Consecration: 8 September 2012 by Tarciso Bertone, SDB

Personal details
- Born: Edoardo Aldo Cerrato; 13 October 1949 Asti, Italy
- Denomination: Roman Catholic
- Education: University of Turin
- Motto: Ille Fidelis (He remains faithful)
- Coat of arms: Edoardo Aldo Cerrato's coat of arms

Styles of Eduardo Aldo Cerrato
- Reference style: The Most Reverend
- Spoken style: Your Excellency
- Religious style: Bishop

Ordination history of Edoardo Aldo Cerrato
History
Priestly ordination
- Ordained by: Vittorio Piola
Episcopal consecration
- Principal consecrator: Tarcisio Bertone, SDB
- Co-consecrators: Arrigo Miglio, Adriano Bernadini

Edoardo Aldo Cerrato C.O. (born 13 October 1949) is an Italian prelate who has serves as Bishop of Ivrea since 2012. Prior of his appointment as Bishop, he served as the Procurator General of the Oratory of St. Philip Neri from 1994 to 2012.

== Biography ==
=== Early life ===
Edoardo was born in Asti on 13 October 1949. Then he moved to Turin with his family, originally from San Marazanotto, a Municipality in Italy.

=== Formation and Priestly ministry ===
In 1972, he obtained a degree in classical literature at the University of Turin, after completing two years philosophy course in Turin, he entered the Oratory of St. Philip Neri in Biella, where he completed his three-year theology course.

On 28 June 1975, he was ordained priest by Bishop Vittorio Piola; according to the custom of the Oratiorian Fathers, he was incardinated to the Diocese of Biella.

He taught Italian and Latin literature in different high schools for twenty years and he was the professor of Patrology in the Seminary of Biella for ten years, in addition to the pastoral care within his Congregation aimed at young people and culture, for years he held the office of ecclesiastical consultant of the Catholic Union of Secondary School Teachers and of ecclesiastical assistant of the Association of Catholic Teachers.

From 1984 to 2005, he was the provost of the Biella Oratory, and subsequently, he was the provost of the Roman Oratory in Rome from 2006 to 2009.

He was elected as the Procurator General of the Oratory of St. Philip Neri by the General Congress of the Oratorians, he led the congregation from 1994 until his episcopal ordination in 2012, he was being confirm for another two terms by the General Congress in 2000 and 2006. During his term as Procurator General, he accompanied 20 new congregations to the canonical foundation, making the Oratorian charism to grow throughout the world.

He is also the author of numerous articles on the history of the Congregation of the Oratory and some works on St. Philip Neri, St. John Henry Newman and Venerable Cesare Baronius.

=== Episcopal ministry ===
On 28 July 2012, Pope Benedict XVI appointed him as the Bishop of Ivrea, His episcopal ordination was held on 8 September 2012 in the Church of Santa Maria in Vallicella in Rome, as known as "Chiesa Nuova". The principal consecrator in Cardinal Tarciso Bertone, co-consectator are Archbishop Arrigo Miglio, Archbishop of Turin and former Bishop of Ivrea, and Archbishop Adriano Bernadini, Apostolic Nunico in Italy and San Marino.

Eduardo was officially installed on 7 October 2012 in the Cathedral of Ivrea.

On 16 December 2024, Pope Francis accepted his resignation due to his old age, he was succeeded by Daniele Salera, then Auxilary Bishop of Rome. When Salera made his official entrance in the Cathedral of Ivrea as the new bishop, Cerrato accompanied him together with Roberto Repole, Archbishop of Turin.

Catholic Church titles
Preceded by Arrigo Miglio	Bishop of Ivrea; 2012 – present	Incumbent
