= Pier Francesco Ferrero =

Italian Roman Catholic abbot, bishop and cardinal

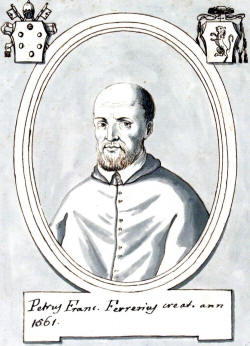
Pier Francesco Ferrero

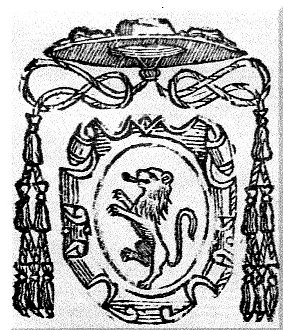
Coat of arms of Cardinal Pier Francesco Ferrero

Pier Francesco Ferrero (1510–1566) was an Italian Roman Catholic abbot, bishop and cardinal.

== Biography ==
Pier Francesco Ferrero was born in Biella in 1506, the son of Goffredo Ferrero, marquis of Bordolano, and his second wife Margherita Sanseverino, marchioness of Bordolano. He was the nephew of Cardinals Gianstefano Ferrero and Bonifacio Ferrero. His older brother, Filiberto Ferrero, also became a cardinal, as did his nephew, Guido Luca Ferrero.

From 1527 to 1550, he was the Abbot of San Stefano, Vercelli. On 20 December 1536 he was elected Bishop of Vercelli. In 1540, he served as vice-legate to Bologna when his uncle Cardinal Bonifacio Ferrero was legate. He served as a delegate to the Council of Trent in 1552. In 1557, he was auditor of Cardinal Carlo Carafa in Brussels. He was nuncio to the Republic of Venice from 1560 to 1 March 1561.

Pope Pius IV made him a cardinal priest in the consistory of 26 February 1561. He received the red hat and the titular church of San Cesareo in Palatio on 3 June 1561. On 10 November 1561 he opted for the titular church of Sant'Agnese in Agone. He resigned the government of the Diocese of Vercelli on 2 May 1562. On 7 October 1566 he opted for the titular church of Sant'Anastasia.

He died in Rome on 14 November 1566. He was buried in the Basilica di Santa Maria Maggiore.

== See also ==
- Catholic Church in Italy
