= Sant'Ambrogio di Torino =

Sant'Ambrogio di Torino Sant Ambreus (Piedmontese) Sent Ambreu (Arpitan)
- Comune
- Comune di Sant'Ambrogio di Torino
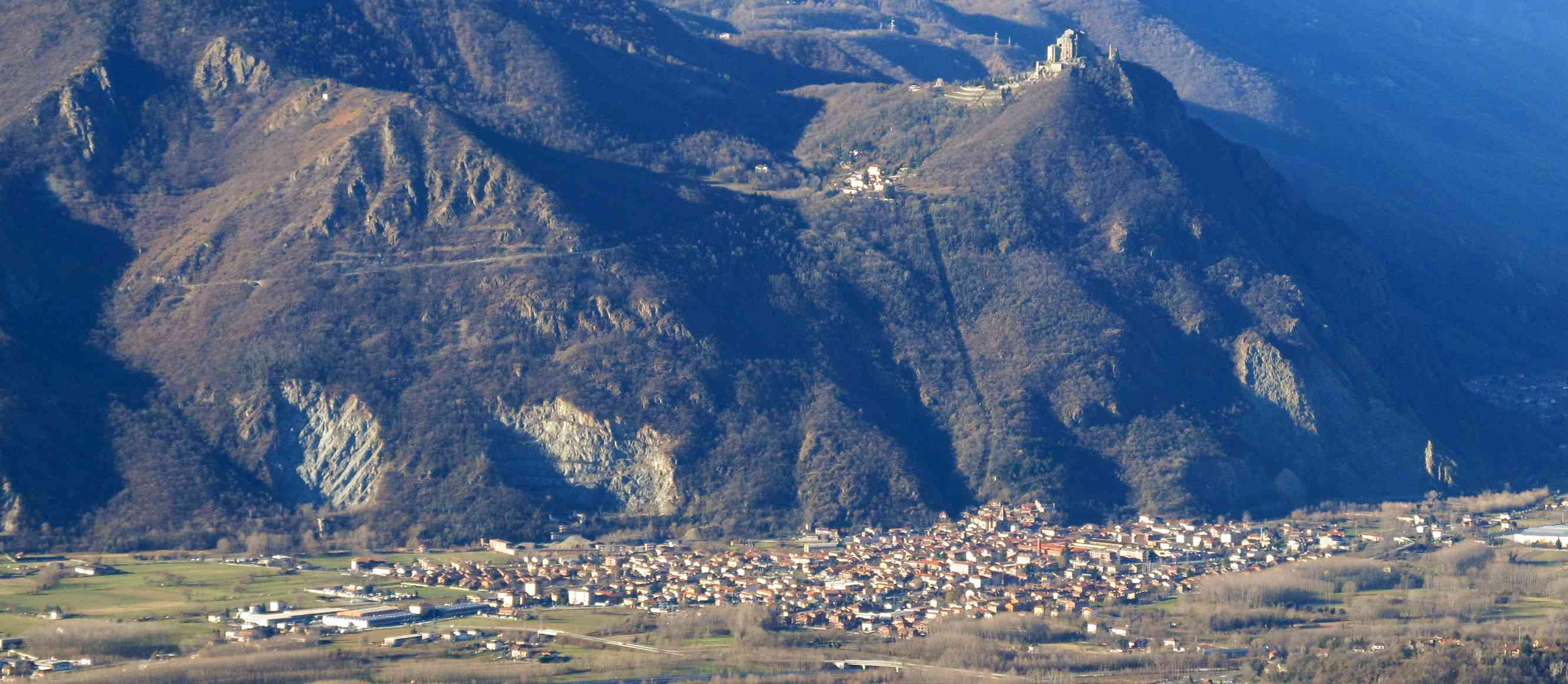
- Sant'Ambrogio seen from the Monte Musinè

- Coat of arms

- Location within Italy Location within Piedmont
- Coordinates: 45°6′N 7°22′E
- Country: Italy
- Region: Piedmont
- Metropolitan city: Turin (TO)
- Frazioni: Bertassi, San Pietro

Government
  - Mayor: Antonella Domenica Falchero

Area
  - Total: 8.6 km^{2} (3.3 sq mi)
- Elevation: 356 m (1,168 ft)

Population (31 December 2010)
  - Total: 4,843
  - Density: 560/km^{2} (1,500/sq mi)
- Demonym: Santambrogesi
- Time zone: UTC+1 (CET)
  - Summer (DST): UTC+2 (CEST)
- Postal code: 10057
- Dialing code: 011
- Patron saint: St. John of Besate
- Saint day: November 21
- Website: Official website

Sant'Ambrogio di Torino (Piedmontese: Sant Ambreus, Arpitan: Sent Ambreu, French: Saint Ambroise) is a comune (municipality) in the Metropolitan City of Turin in the Italian region Piedmont, located about 25 km (16 mi) west of Turin in the Susa Valley.

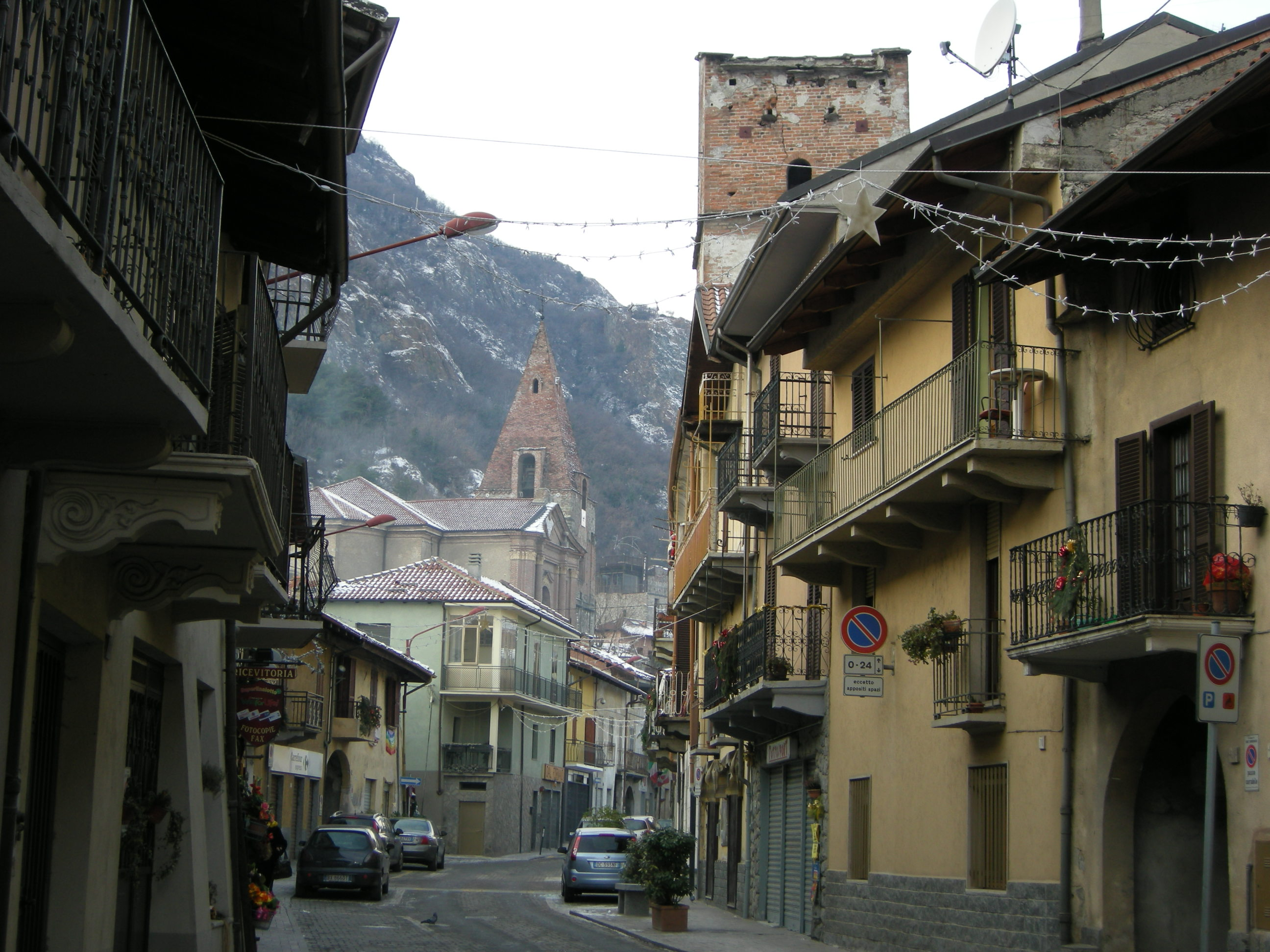
Via Umberto I (urban central street) in Sant'Ambrogio di Torino

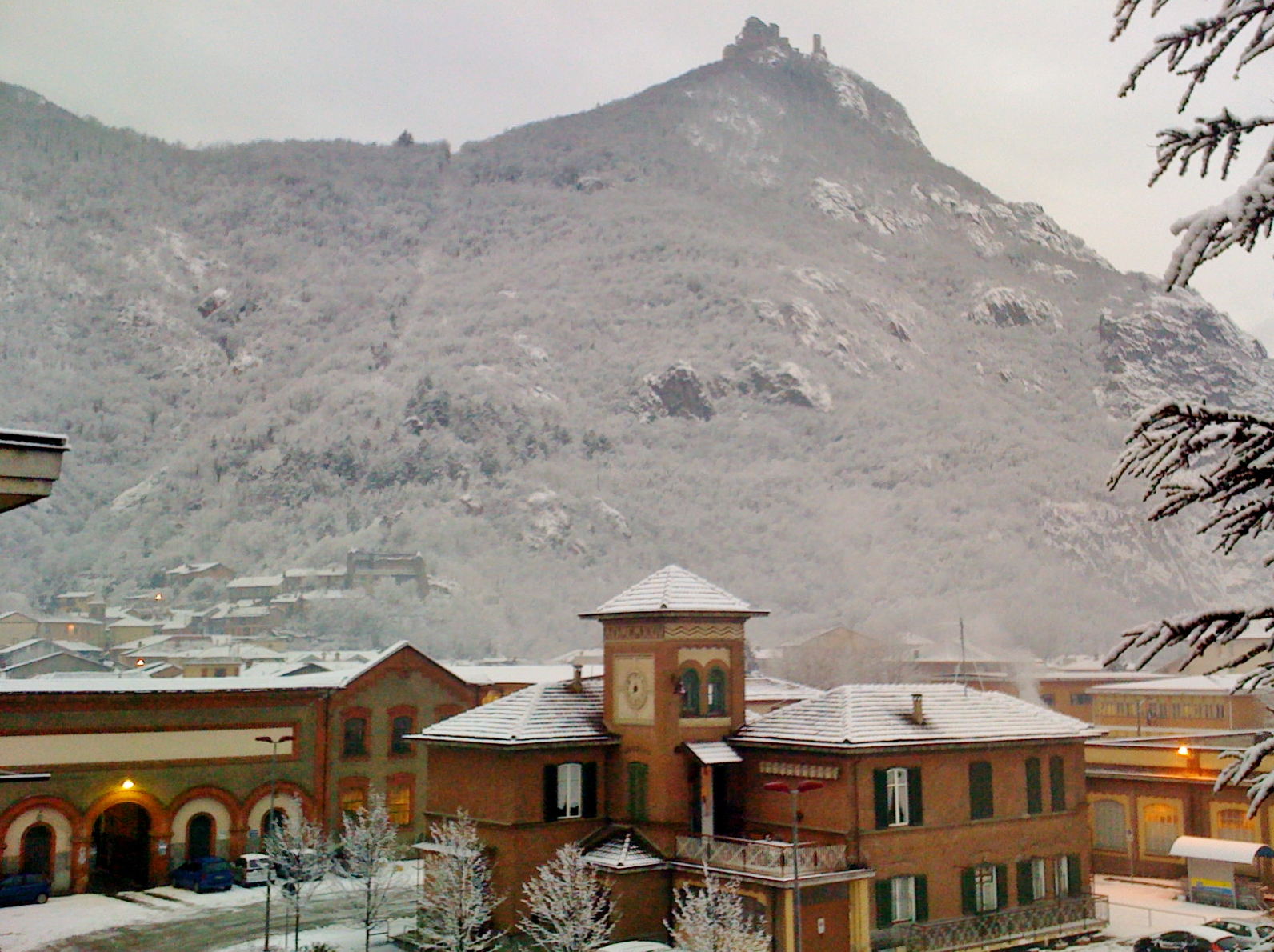
Sant'Ambrogio di Torino winter panorama with the Sacra di San Michele

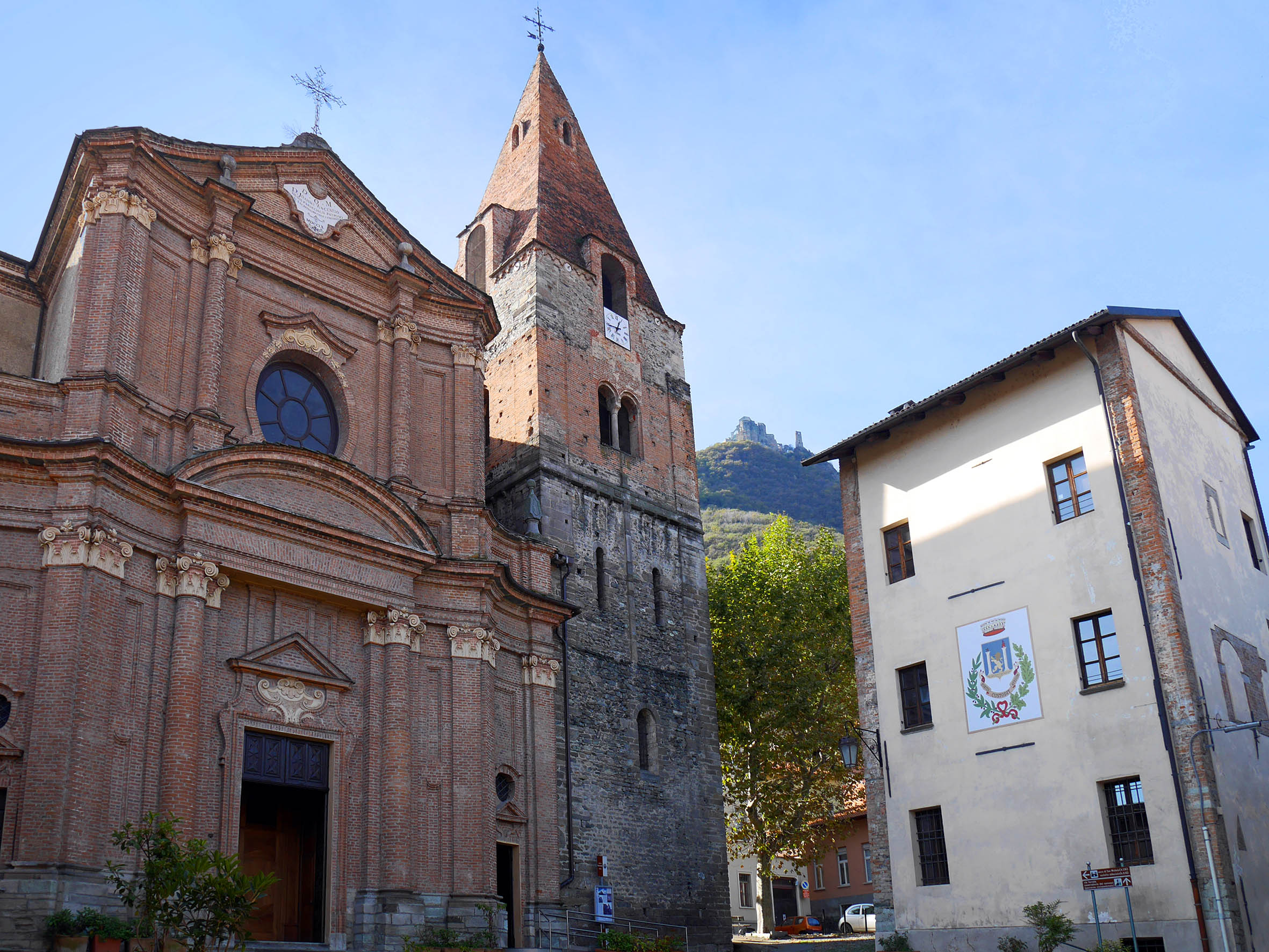
San Giovanni Vincenzo square with municipal tower and Sacra di San Michele

Sant'Ambrogio di Torino borders the municipalities of Caprie, Villar Dora, Chiusa di San Michele, Avigliana and Valgioie. The ancient thousand-year abbey of the Sacra di San Michele, founded in the years between 983 and 987, is located within the municipality at the top of Mount Pirchiriano. The town's sights include several medieval towers, the 13th-century castle and walls, a Romanesque bell tower from the 12th century, and remains of the 11th-century church of San Pietro.

== Culture ==
=== Historical Documents ===
The Historical Archive of the Municipality of Sant'Ambrogio di Torino preserves documents from the year 1553. The archive of the Parish of San Giovanni Vincenzo holds records from the year 1580 onwards, when the Parish became independent of the Sacra di San Michele. Since 1810 the parish of San Giovanni Vincenzo in Sant'Ambrogio di Torino, has taken care of the conservation of Breviary of San Michele della Chiusa, a liturgical text of 1315 in two volumes which shows the annual cycle of prayers of the monks of the Sacra di San Michele, and contains parts of melodies sung with notations typical of this monastery, with forms not found in Gregorian texts of other monasteries.

== Territory ==
The urban center of Sant'Ambrogio is located in the lower Valle di Susa, on the orographic right of the Dora Riparia and at the foot of Mount Pirchiriano. In addition to the central urban nucleus, there are two main hamlets in the area: San Pietro and Bertassi and 5 other decentralized residential areas: Cascina Bertini, Cascina Dosio, Cascina Gariglio, Cascina Pogolotti and Cascina Verdina.

The hydrography of the territory is characterized by the presence of the Dora Riparia. The water network is completed by some minor waterways, such as Rio San Michele (from San Pietro to Sant'Ambrogio), Rio Fico, Bealera di Rivoli (canal built in 1310), another older canal in the past known as Canale della Marchesa Adelaide excavated between 1073 and 1091 and later in the fourteenth century renamed as Canale Cantarana, and the Canale Naviglio.

== Monuments, historic buildings and infrastructures ==
=== Civil buildings and monuments ===
Noteworthy are the Palazzo Abbaziale di Sant'Ambrogio, of medieval origin (1176) and the city walls with a quadrangular structure, dating back to the 13th century.

The Palazzo del Feudo di Sant'Ambrogio, built in the 13th century, was enlarged in the 18th century. Among the more recent buildings are the Town Hall (1871) located in Piazza XXV Aprile, the industrial complex of Maglificio Fratelli Bosio (1871) and the Antiche Mura Theater (19th century).

=== Religious buildings and monuments ===
There are numerous religious architectures present in the municipal area: among them, the main one is the millenary abbey of the Sacra di San Michele, built in the period between 983 and 987. A little below in Borgata San Pietro is the Sanctuary of Our Madonna di Fátima (Sant'Ambrogio di Torino), built in 1715 as a church dedicated to Sant'Anna and in 1943 became the first Italian sanctuary dedicated to the Madonna di Fátima; the church of San Giovanni Vincenzo, built in 1763 by the architect Bernardo Vittone; the church of San Rocco (Sant'Ambrogio di Torino), dating back to the 17th century and now home to the "San Rocco cultural center", and the church of the Beata Vergine delle Grazie (Sant ' Ambrogio di Torino), from 1720. The ruins of the ancient church of San Pietro are still preserved, dating back to the 11th century and located in Borgata San Pietro, while from the 13th century it was an ancient church romanesque style, of which the trace is still visible on piazza IV Novembre. Along the walking way named “mulattiera” to San Pietro there is a fifteen Via crucis built in 1943.

=== Towers ===
In the village there are some medieval towers:

- Bell tower of Sant'Ambrogio (11th century);
- Municipal Tower of Sant'Ambrogio (13th century);
- Tower of the walls of Sant'Ambrogio (13th century);
- Tower della Dogana di Sant'Ambrogio (18th century);
- Tower of the Palazzo del Feudo di Sant'Ambrogio (18th century).

Inserted in the complex of the Sacra di San Michele is the Torre della Bell'Alda (12th century).

Also worthy of note is the MFB Tower of the Bosio Brothers Manufacture of Sant'Ambrogio, built in 1924 in the complex of the Maglificio Fratelli Bosio and destroyed in 1984.

=== Fountains ===
The village is characterized by several fountains, including that of «del Paschè» and that of «della Rustà», both built in 1751 along the course of Via Umberto I.

Others are the CAI UGET Fountain (20th century) at the 3rd Cross of the S.Ambrogio-San Pietro Via Crucis, the Lombardi Pilone Fountain (19th century) at the 10th Cross of the S.Ambrogio-San Pietro Via Crucis, the Fountain of Piazzale di San Pietro (19th century) in Borgata San Pietro, the Fontana S.Anna (19th century) in Borgata San Pietro. Some have been closed such as the Fountain of Via Umberto I ° (19th century) closed in 1996, and the Fontana del Mulino (19th century) demolished in 1987.

== Infrastructure ==
Along the northern walls, still existing today with the road called "Via Antiche Mura", a canal called "della Marchesa Adelaide" was dug between 1073 and 1091. wanted by Adelaide di Susa, great-granddaughter of the Marquis Arduino and mother-in-law of the Emperor Henry IV, who wanted to build it to promote agricultural development and the products of the earth. The canal, which still exists today, later assumed the name of "Canale Cantarana".

== Twin towns and sister cities ==
Sant'Ambrogio di Torino is twinned with:

- Sant'Ambrogio sul Garigliano, Italy (2003)
- Sant'Ambrogio di Valpolicella, Italy (2004)
