= Diocese of Ivrea =

Roman Catholic diocese in Italy

Diocese of Ivrea Dioecesis Eporediensis

Catholic
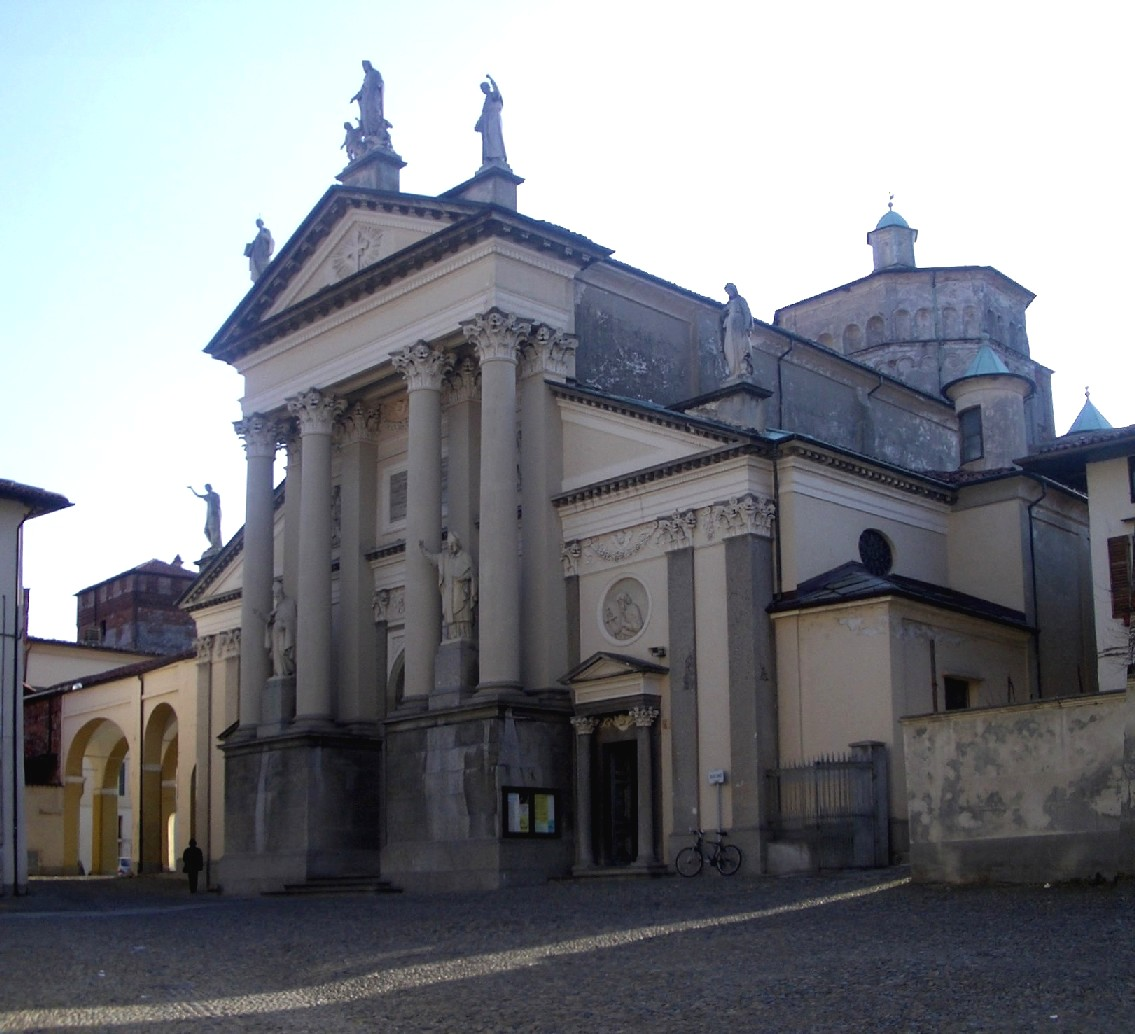
- Ivrea Cathedral

Location
- Country: Italy
- Ecclesiastical province: Turin

Statistics
- Area: 1,850 km^{2} (710 sq mi)
- Population: Total; Catholics: (as of 2013); 212,169; 206,800 (est.) (97.5%)
- Parishes: 141

Information
- Denomination: Catholic Church
- Rite: Roman Rite
- Established: 5th Century
- Cathedral: Cattedrale di S. Maria Assunta
- Secular priests: 99 (diocesan); 33 (Religious Orders); 17 Permanent Deacons

Current leadership
- Pope: Leo XIV
- Bishop: Daniele Salera
- Bishops emeritus: Edoardo Aldo Cerrato, C.O.

Map

Website
- http://www.diocesivrea.it/

The Diocese of Ivrea (Latin: Dioecesis Eporediensis) is a Latin diocese of the Catholic Church in Piedmont. For a time the diocese included the territory which had once been the diocese of Aosta, suppressed in 1803 but restored in 1817. Up until 1517 Ivrea was a suffragan of the Archdiocese of Milan; it is now a suffragan of the Archdiocese of Turin.

== History ==
Ivrea is on the Via Francigena, a pilgrim route that started as far away as Canterbury in England, and brought pilgrims through the Great St Bernard Pass in the Alps to Rome. During the Middle Ages, pilgrims could travel on to Bari and take ship for Jerusalem. The episcopal see of Ivrea is said to have been established by Eusebius of Vercelli about the middle of the fourth century. The first historically certain bishop is Eulogius (c. 451).

According to a tradition unsupported by evidence, Ivrea is the place where Saint Patrick was consecrated bishop, c. 431, before evangelizing Ireland. Blessed Thaddeus MacCarthy died here in 1492 as a pilgrim returning from Rome to Munster, Ireland and miracles hae been attributed to him.

Saint Malachy of Armagh passed through Ivrea in 1139 on his way to Rome. In 1847 the Bishop of Ivrea sent the Archbishop of Dublin forty pounds for the famine-stricken people of Ireland in memory of Thaddeus MacCarthy the Irish pilgrim who had died in Ivrea in 1492.

In the reign of Pope Gregory V (996–999), the bishops of Piedmont wrote an urgent letter to the Pope, complaining about the violent and vicious behavior of King Ardouin, which included the slaying of priests and burning their bodies, and hoping that Gregory could use his imperial connection as the grandson of the Emperor Otto I, to help them. Pope Gregory offered his sympathy for the troubles that the Church of Ivrea was suffering.

On 9 July 1000, the Emperor Otto III, on the advice of Archbishop Henribertus of Cologne, confirmed the Bishop of Ivrea in possession of the entire city of Ivrea to a distance of three miles from the city, and granted him in addition a number of country districts. This was confirmed by the Emperor Conrad on 1 April 1027, with the statement that the jurisdiction of the bishop extended four miles from the city.

Bishop Enrico (1029–1059) was the founder of the monastery of Saint Stephen in the diocese of Ivrea in 1044, for which he obtained papal confirmation after the Roman Synod in 1059.

=== Papal intervention ===
On 29 January 1206, Pope Innocent III was so dissatisfied with the administration of the diocese of Ivrea, that he appointed the Bishop of Vercelli, the Abbot of Tiglieto, and the priest Albert of Mantua to demand the resignation of Bishop Giovanni because he was insufficient to the task (cum sit insufficiens et inutilis). The Pope ordered that, if he did not resign voluntarily, seeing that charges of simony and neglect (dilapidatione ac symonia) had been proven, they were to depose him. When the new bishop, Pietro, who had been elected in accord with a mandate sent by the Pope to the Archbishop of Milan and the Chapter of Ivrea, arrived in Ivrea, his safety was so threatened that he fled and went into hiding, sending off a letter to Pope Innocent about his situation. On 26 October 1206 the Pope replied, urging him to return to Ivrea, pointing out that a bishop is married to his church and ought not to desert his obligations to his spouse.

=== Imperial control ===
The Emperor Frederick II convened an imperial diet, to meet at Speyer on 30 November 1218. Bishop Obertus de Cocconato (1209–1239) was present, along with Marchese Guglielmo of Monferrat and the bishops of Turin and Novara. They all subscribed the grant by Frederick to Guglielmo of four castles in a charter of 21 February 1219. Then, on 25 February 1219, Frederick confirmed for Obertus the possession of the bishops of Ivrea of the County of Ivrea, as well as all the privileges granted the bishops by his predecessors. The vassals of the Bishopric of Ivrea were: the Marchese of Monferrato, the Counts of S. Martino, Agliè, Novano and Bairo, and the Barons of Parella, Torassa, Ronodizzone, Azeglio, Burollo, Valle di Chy, Villa di Strambino, Barbania, and Loranzè The bishops, however, were by no means free of imperial supervision and control. The Emperor Otto IV (1209–1215) had appointed a Rector of Ivrea, Guido di Biandrate, which was renewed by Frederick II on 20 May 1238. But then, when the contest with Pope Gregory IX was at a fever pitch, and Frederick found that he could not control Guido di Biandrate, he appointed Arnaldo Vasco, Lord of Altesano, as Captain Imperial and Rector of Ivrea and Canavese; in 1240 Arnaldo was succeeded by Guglielmo Sivoletto. Finally, in 1248, Frederick gave Ivrea and Canavese to Thomas II, Count of Savoy, though the transfer did not take effect due to the death of the Emperor.

This was the beginning of a decline in the power of both the bishop of Ivrea and the commune. The appointment of procurators who never were consecrated bishops, Conradus (1243–1249) and Fredericus de Fronte (1264–1289), and a bishop, Joannes de Barono (1250–1264), who was not consecrated until six years after his appointment, meant long years without strong leadership, until finally, in 1313, Emperor Henry VII made Ivrea a subject of the Counts of Savoy.

From 1497 to 1612 the bishopric of Ivrea was the exclusive property of the family of Ferrero, the relatives and descendants of Sebastiano Ferrero, Treasurer General of the Dukes of Savoy.

=== French and the plague ===
In June 1630, a major outbreak of plague struck the area of Ivrea, in the wake of the French invasion of Louis XIII. The city was placed under strict quarantine by the Magistrate of Sanitation, which was not lifted until 23 April 1631. The shortages, especially of food, which were already severe due to the war, were increased, as were the sufferings of the people. In one parish alone, S. Lorenzo fuori le mure, thirty-one people were registered as dead between 1 September 1630 and 23 April 1631.

=== Synods ===
A diocesan synod was an irregularly held, but important, meeting of the bishop of a diocese and his clergy. Its purpose was (1) to proclaim generally the various decrees already issued by the bishop; (2) to discuss and ratify measures on which the bishop chose to consult with his clergy; (3) to publish statutes and decrees of the diocesan synod, of the provincial synod, and of the Holy See.

In 1588, 1589, 1590, 1592, 1598, 1600 and 1602 Bishop Cesare Ferrero (1581–1612) held diocesan synods and published the Synodal Constitutions.

Bishop Giuseppe di Ceva (1614–1633) held a synod in 1618 and another in 1622. Bishop Octavio Asinari (1634–1656?) held a diocesan synod on 18 April 1646; and Bishop Giacinto Trucchi, O.P. (1669–1698) held one on 27 April 1672.

A diocesan synod was held by Bishop Michele Vittorio Villa (1741–1763) from 3 to 5 June 1753.

Bishop Davide Riccardi (1878–1886) held his first diocesan synod on 6 September 1883, and published the proceedings.

=== French conquest ===
When the French revolution guillotined King Louis XVI, King Victor Amadeus III of Sardinia declared war on the French Republic, but in three successive engagements, the Battle of Montenotte (12 April 1796), the Battle of Millesimo (13–14 April 1796) and the Battle of Mondovi (21 April 1796), General Napoleon Bonaparte defeated the Piedmontese. In suing for peace, Victor Amadeus was forced to cede Savoy and Nice to France. The territory, including the diocese of Ivrea, became part of the Department of Mont-Blanc. King Victor Amadeus died on 18 October 1796, and his son and successor, Carlo Emanuele was forced to abdicate on 6 December 1798.

The French government, in the guise of ending the practices of feudalism, confiscated the incomes and benefices of the bishops and priests and made them employees of the state, with a fixed income and the obligation to swear an oath of loyalty to the French constitution. As in metropolitan France, the government program also included reducing the number of bishoprics, making them conform as far as possible with the civil administration's "departments". Ivrea became the capital of a department called Dora. Following the Concordat of 1801 between Bonaparte and Pope Pius VII, the Pope issued a bull, Gravissimis causis (1 June 1803), in which the number of diocese in Piedmont was reduced to eight: Turin, Vercelli, Ivrea, Acqui, Asti, Mondovi, Alessandria and Saluzzo. Ivrea was united with the former diocese of Aosta. One of the bishops who suffered the loss of his See (in 1797) was Bishop Giuseppe Grimaldi of Pinerolo, who was appointed by Pius VII to be Bishop of Ivrea in February 1805, to replace the deceased Bishop Ponchietti.

When Bonaparte crossed the Alps again in the Spring of 1800, intent on driving the Austrians out of the Po Valley, he sent General Jean Lannes to secure Ivrea and destroy its fortifications.

The confused situation of the dioceses in Piedmont was addressed by Pope Pius VII in his bull Beati Petri (17 July 1817) as far as the redrawing of diocesan boundaries was concerned. Bishop Grimaldi of Ivrea, who had also been administrator of the diocese of Vercelli since 1814, was named the first Archbishop of Vercelli on 1 October 1817.

== Cathedral of Santa Maria Assunta ==
The Cathedral of Santa Maria Assunta is located on the Via San Savino in Ivrea.

== Religious congregations ==
With the conquest of Savoy by the French army (1797–1802) and its cession to France by Victor Amadeus III in the treaty of Paris (15 May 1796), the decrees of the National Constituent Assembly and the French National Assembly were carried out in Savoy, including the suppression of all monasteries, convents, and Chapters. Establishments of various religious orders in Ivrea included:

- Cistercians (at SS. Maria e Michele)
- Canons Regular of the Lateran (Mortariensi) (at S. Lorenzo fuori le mura)
- Franciscans (up to the beginning of the 19th century)
- Dominicans (in the district called Pasquero outside the walls; and at S. Maurizio, up to the beginning of the 19th century)
- Friars Minor Observant (from 1455)
- Augustinians (in the Borgo called Bando)
- Capuchins (from 1606)
- Fathers of Christian Doctrine (Dottrinari) (from 1683 to 1869)
- Daughters of Charity of the Most Holy Annunciation (Founded in 1744 at Montanaro Canavese) (the only Religious Order not suppressed by the French)
- Sisters of Charity of the Immaculate Conception (Founded in 1828 at Rivarolo Canavese by Antonia Maria Verna)
- The Knights Templar had a convent in Ivrea near S. Nazario from before 1130. In 1312 their property was handed over to the Knights of Malta.

== Bishops ==
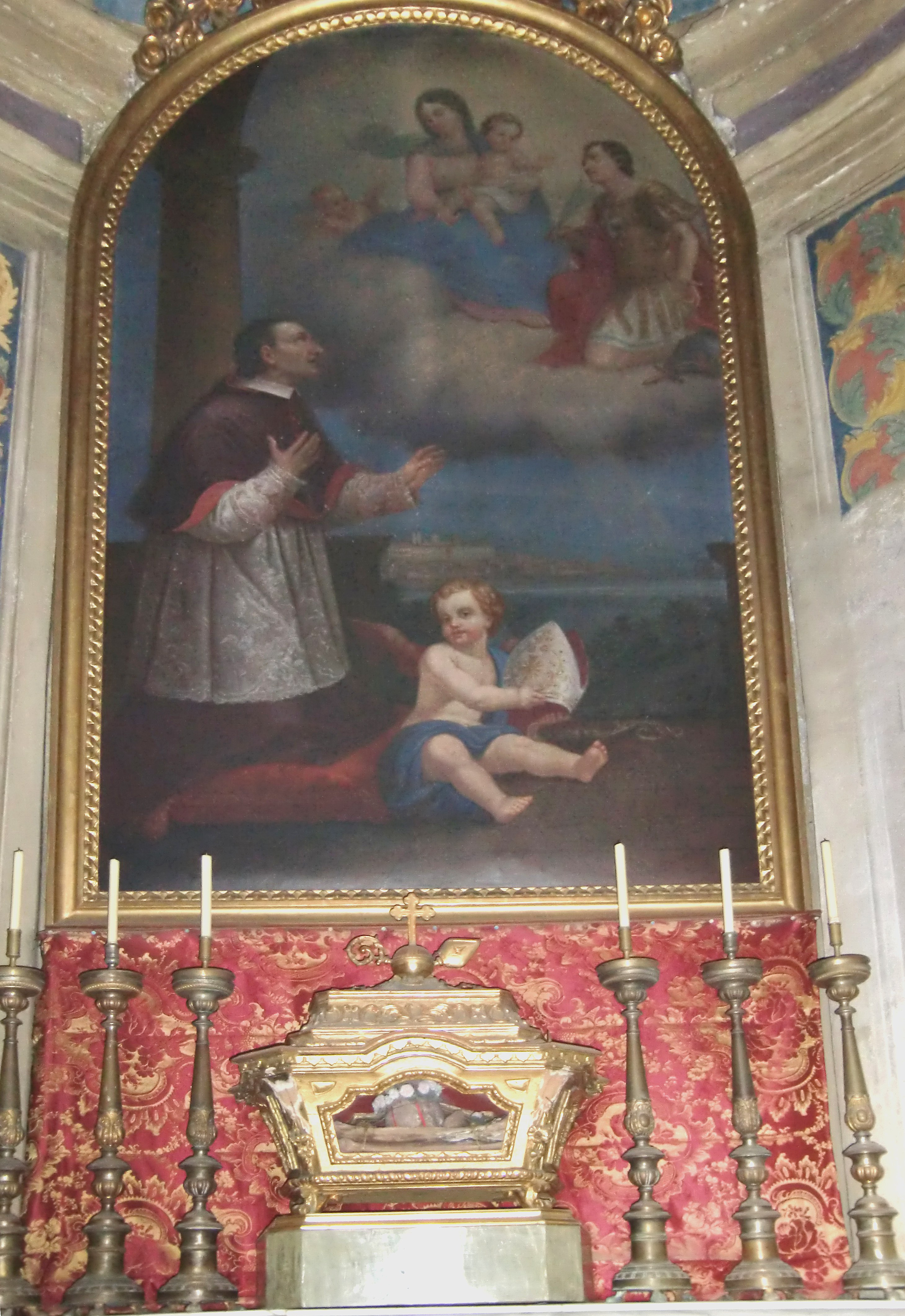
Ivrea Duomo Cappella Warmondo

- Eulogius (c. 451)
- Innocentius (c. 486)

...

- Desiderius (c. 680)

...

- Bessus (c. 770?)

...

- Josephus (844–855)
- Adalgerus (c. 967)
- Warmundus (Veremondo) (c. 969–1002)
- Ottobianus (attested 1003)

...

- Hugo (c. 1026–1029)
- Enrico (1029–1059)

...

- [Albertus (c. 1073)]
- Ogerius (c. 1075–c. 1094)

...

- Guido (1122–c. 1162)
- Gaimario (1166–1189)
- Gaido (1192–c. 1199))

=== from 1200 to 1500 ===
- Giovanni (1200–1206)
- Pietro (c. 1206–1209)
- Obertus Cocconato (1209–1239)
- Conradus (1243–1249) Bishop-elect
- Joannes de Barono (1250–1264)
- Fredericus de Fronte (1264–1289) Bishop-elect
- Alberto Gonzaga, O.Min. (1289–1322)
- Hubertus Solaro (1322–1326)
- Palaynus Avogrado (1326–1346)
- Jacobus de Francisco (1346–1358)
- Joannes Mistrali (1358–1360)
- Petrus de Camera (1361–1373)
- Petrus Condono (1373–1399) (Avignon Obedience)
  - Nicolao (1394) (Roman Obedience)
- Bonifacio di S. Martino Torre (1399–1426 Died)
- Jacobus de Pomariis (1427–1437)
- Giovanni Parella di San Martino (1437–1479 Died)
- Domenico Manfredi, O.S.B. (1479–1483)
- Nicolò Garigliati (1485–1497 Died)
- Bonifacio Ferrero (1497–1509)

=== from 1500 to 1700 ===
- Giovanni Stefano Ferrero (1509–1510 Died)
- Bonifacio Ferrero (1511–1518 Resigned)
- Filiberto Ferrero (1518–1549)
- Sebastiano Ferrero (1549–1563 Resigned)
- Ferdinando Ferrero Fieschi (1563–1580 Died)
- Cesare Ferrero (1581–1612 Died)
- Enrico Silvio, O.Carm. (1612) Bishop-elect
- Giuseppe di Ceva (1614–1633)
- Octavio Asinari, B. (1634–1656?)
- Filiberto Milliet de Faverges, C.R.L. (1658–1663)
- Pompeo Valperga (1664–1669)
- Giacinto Trucchi, O.P. (1669–1698 Died)

=== since 1700 ===
- Alessandro Lambert (1698–1706 Died)
- Giovanni Silvio Nicola (1727–1733 Died)

Sede vacante (1733–1741)

- Michele Vittorio Villa (1741–1763 Died)
- Francesco Lucerna Rorengo di Rorà (1764–1768)
- Giuseppe Pochettini di Serravalle (1769–1803 Died)
- Giuseppe Maria Pietro Grimaldi (1805–1817)
- Columbano Giovanni Battista Chiaverotti, O.S.B. (1817–1818)

Sede vacante (1818–1824)

- Luigi Pochettini di Serravalle (1824–1837)
- Luigi Moreno (1838–1878)
- Davide Riccardi (1878–1886)
- Agostino Richelmy (1886–1897 Appointed, Archbishop of Turin; Cardinal in 1899)
- Matteo Angelo Filipello (1898–1939 Died)
- Paolo Rostagno (1939–1959 Died)
- Albino Mensa (1960–1966 Appointed, Archbishop of Vercelli)
- Luigi Bettazzi (1966–1999 Retired)
- Arrigo Miglio (1999–2012 Appointed, Archbishop of Cagliari)
- Edoardo Aldo Cerrato, C.O. (2012–2024 Retired)
- Daniele Salera (2024–)

== Parishes ==
There are 141 parishes, 140 within the Piedmontese Province of Turin and the other within the Province of Vercelli, also in Piedmont.

== Bibliography ==
=== Reference works ===
- Gams, Pius Bonifatius (1873). Series episcoporum Ecclesiae catholicae: quotquot innotuerunt a beato Petro apostolo. Ratisbon: Typis et Sumptibus Georgii Josephi Manz. pp. 816–817. (in Latin)
- Eubel, Conradus, ed. (1913). Hierarchia catholica. Vol. Tomus 1 (second ed.). Münster: Libreria Regensbergiana. (in Latin) [Eubel was unacquainted with local Piedmontese documents, and is frequently unreliable]
- Eubel, Conradus, ed. (1914). Hierarchia catholica. Vol. Tomus 2 (second ed.). Münster: Libreria Regensbergiana. (in Latin)
- Eubel, Conradus; Gulik, Guilelmus (1923). Hierarchia catholica (in Latin). Vol. Tomus 3 (second ed.). Münster: Libreria Regensbergiana.
- Gauchat, Patritius (Patrice) (1935). Hierarchia catholica (in Latin). Vol. Tomus IV (1592-1667). Münster: Libraria Regensbergiana.
- Ritzler, Remigius; Sefrin, Pirminus (1952). Hierarchia catholica medii et recentis aevi V (1667-1730) (in Latin). Patavii: Messagero di S. Antonio.
- Ritzler, Remigius; Sefrin, Pirminus (1958). Hierarchia catholica medii et recentis aevi (in Latin). Vol. Tomus VI (1730-1799). Patavii: Messagero di S. Antonio.
- Ritzler, Remigius; Sefrin, Pirminus (1968). Hierarchia Catholica medii et recentioris aevi sive summorum pontificum, S. R. E. cardinalium, ecclesiarum antistitum series... A pontificatu Pii PP. VII (1800) usque ad pontificatum Gregorii PP. XVI (1846) (in Latin). Vol. VII. Monasterii: Libr. Regensburgiana.
- Remigius Ritzler; Pirminus Sefrin (1978). Hierarchia catholica Medii et recentioris aevi... A Pontificatu PII PP. IX (1846) usque ad Pontificatum Leonis PP. XIII (1903) (in Latin). Vol. VIII. Il Messaggero di S. Antonio.
- Pięta, Zenon (2002). Hierarchia catholica medii et recentioris aevi... A pontificatu Pii PP. X (1903) usque ad pontificatum Benedictii PP. XV (1922) (in Latin). Vol. IX. Padua: Messagero di San Antonio. ISBN 978-88-250-1000-8.

=== Studies ===
- Durando, Edoardo (1902). Le carte dell' Archivio capitolare d'Ivrea fino al 1230 con una scelta delle più notevoli dal 1231 al 1313 (in Italian and Latin). Pinerolo: Chiantore-Mascarelli.
- Gabotto, Ferdinando (1900). Le carte dello Archivio vescovile d'Ivrea: fino al 1313. Vol. I.language=italian, Latin. Pinerolo: Tip. Chiantore-Mascarelli.
- Gabotto, Ferdinando (1900). Le carte dello Archivio vescovile d'Ivrea: fino al 1313. Vol. II.language=italian, Latin. Pinerolo: Tip. Chiantore-Mascarelli.
- Guasco, Maurilio; Marta Margotti; Francesco Traniello (2006). Storia della Chiesa di Ivrea: in epoca contemporanea (in Italian). Roma: Viella. ISBN 978-88-8334-206-6.
- Kehr, Paul Fridolin (1914). Italia pontificia : sive, Repertorium privilegiorum et litterarum a romanis pontificibus ante annum 1598 Italiae ecclesiis, monasteriis, civitatibus singulisque personis concessorum. Vol. VI. pars ii. Berolini: Weidmann. pp. 143–156.
- Lanzoni, Francesco (1927). Le diocesi d'Italia dalle origini al principio del secolo VII (an. 604). Faenza: F. Lega, pp. 1051-1052. (in Italian)
- Manno, Antonio, ed. (1907). Bibliografua storica degli stati della Monarchia di Savoia. Biblioteca storica italiana, Volume ottavo (in Italian). Torino: Fratelli Bocca. pp. 290–322.
- Nigra, Costantino; et al. (1900). Eporediensia (in Italian). Pinerolo: Chiantore-Mascarelli.
- Peyron, Amedeo (1843). Notizia dell'archivio del reverendissimo capitolo d'Ivrea del cav. Amedeo Peyron (in Italian). Torino: Stamperiaeale.
- Porter, Arthur Kingsley (1916). Lombard Architecture. Vol. II. Yale University Press. pp. 14–24.
- Provana del Sabbione, Luigi G. (1844). Studi critici sovra la storia d'Italia a tempi del Re Ardoino (in Italian and Latin). Torino: Stamperia Reale.
- Saroglia, Giovanni (1881). Memorie storiche sulla chiesa d' Ivrea : cenni biografici. Ivrea: A. Tomatis. (in Italian)
- Savio, Fedele (1898). Gli antichi vescovi d'Italia dalle origini al 1300 descritti per regioni: Il Piemonte (in Italian). Torino: Fratelli Bocca. pp. 175–220.
- Schwartz, Gerhard (1907). Die Besetzung der Bistümer Reichsitaliens unter den sächsischen und salischen Kaisern: mit den Listen der Bischöfe, 951-1122. Leipzig: B.G. Teubner. (in German)
- Ughelli, Ferdinando; Coleti, Niccolo (1719). Italia sacra, sive de episcopis Italiae et insularum adjacentium (in Latin). Vol. Tomus quartus (4) (2nd ed.). Venice: Apud Sebastianum Coleti. pp. 1064–1068.
