= Ivrea Castle =

Castle in Ivrea, Italy

Coordinates: 45°28′05″N 7°52′27″E

- Castello d'Ivrea
- Ivrea, Piedmont, Italy
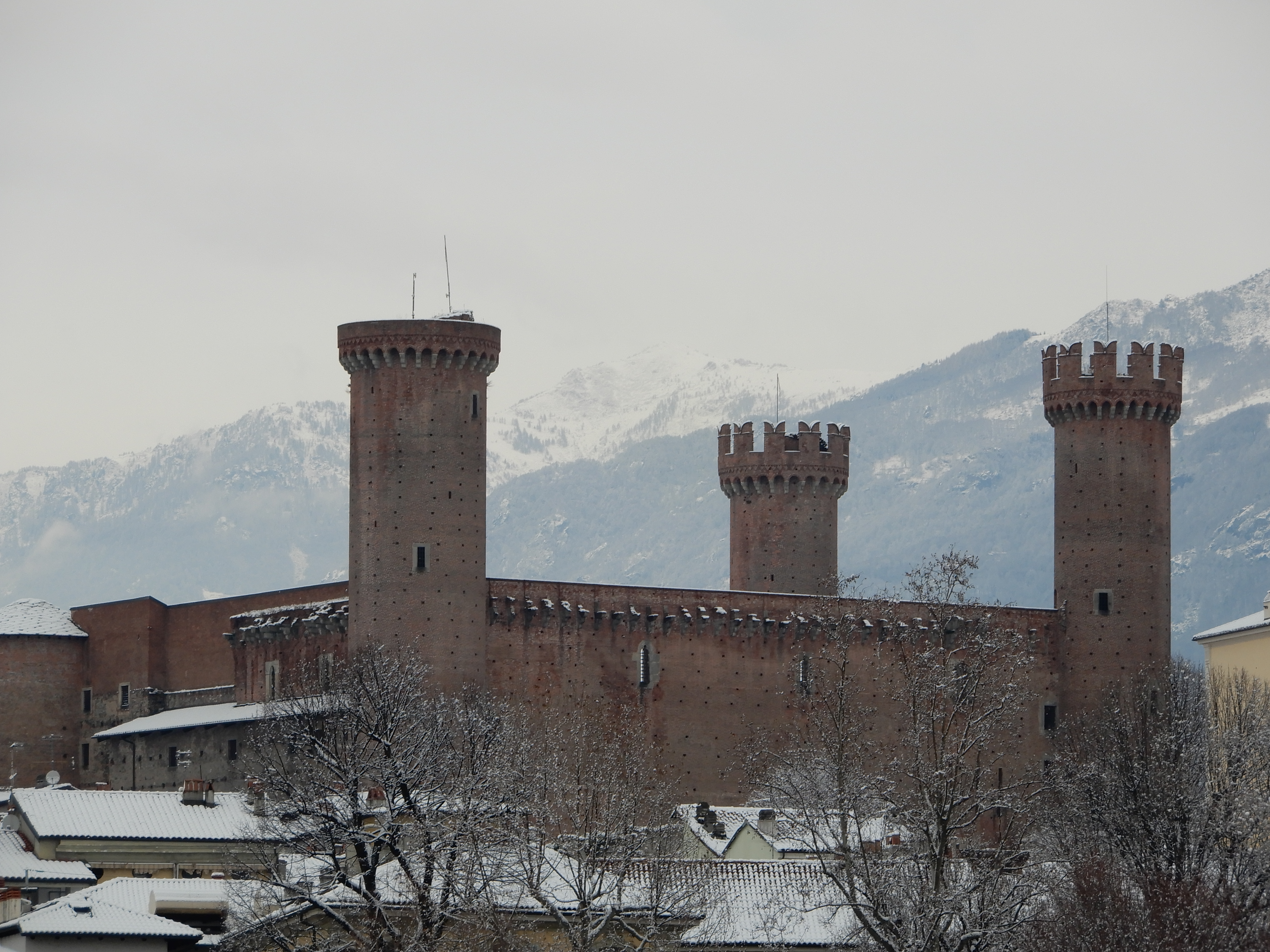
- Ivrea Castle in winter

Site information
- Type: Castle

Location
- Location within Italy

Site history
- Built: 1358

Ivrea Castle (Italian: Castello d'Ivrea) is a castle located at Piazza Castello in Ivrea, Italy.

== History ==
It was built in 1358 on behalf of Amadeus VI, Count of Savoy to signify the dominance of the House of Savoy over the region.

In 1676, the northwestern tower, which served as powder magazine, was struck by a lightning. The resulting explosion caused 51 deads, 187 damaged houses and the collapse of the tower itself. The tower has never been rebuilt to its full height.

In the 18th century, the castle was converted into a prison, at the beginning destined to State prisoners only, and later also to common prisoners. It retained this function until 1970.

The castle is currently owned by the Municipality of Ivrea, which, in recent years, has intensified restoration efforts to open it to the public. Some recent restoration works, which began in January 2023, led to its reopening in July 2024.

== Description ==
The castle has four towers erected on a plan flank. It is located next to a cathedral and a bishop's palace. The castle is mentioned in the work of Giosuè Carducci.

== Gallery ==
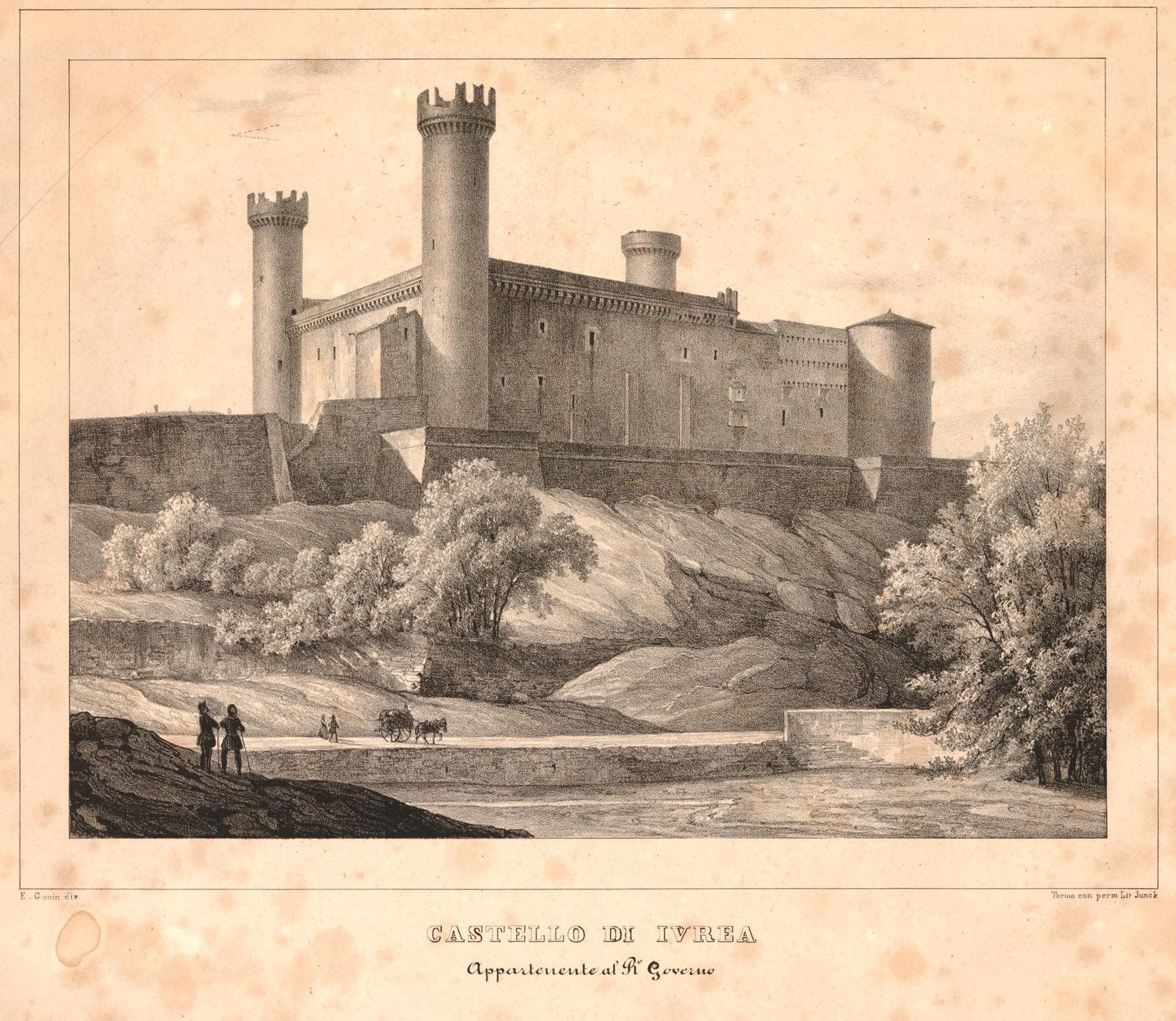

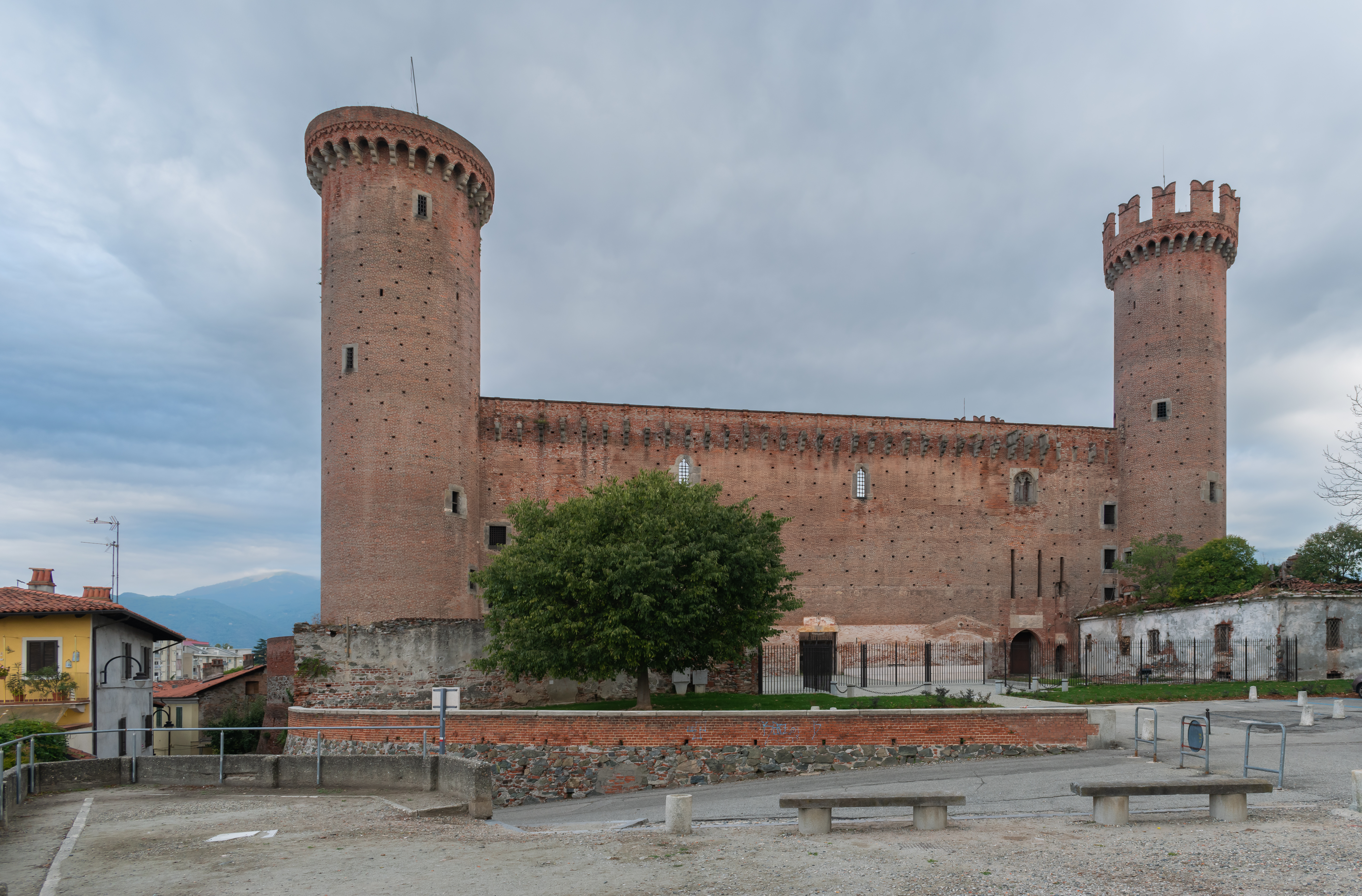

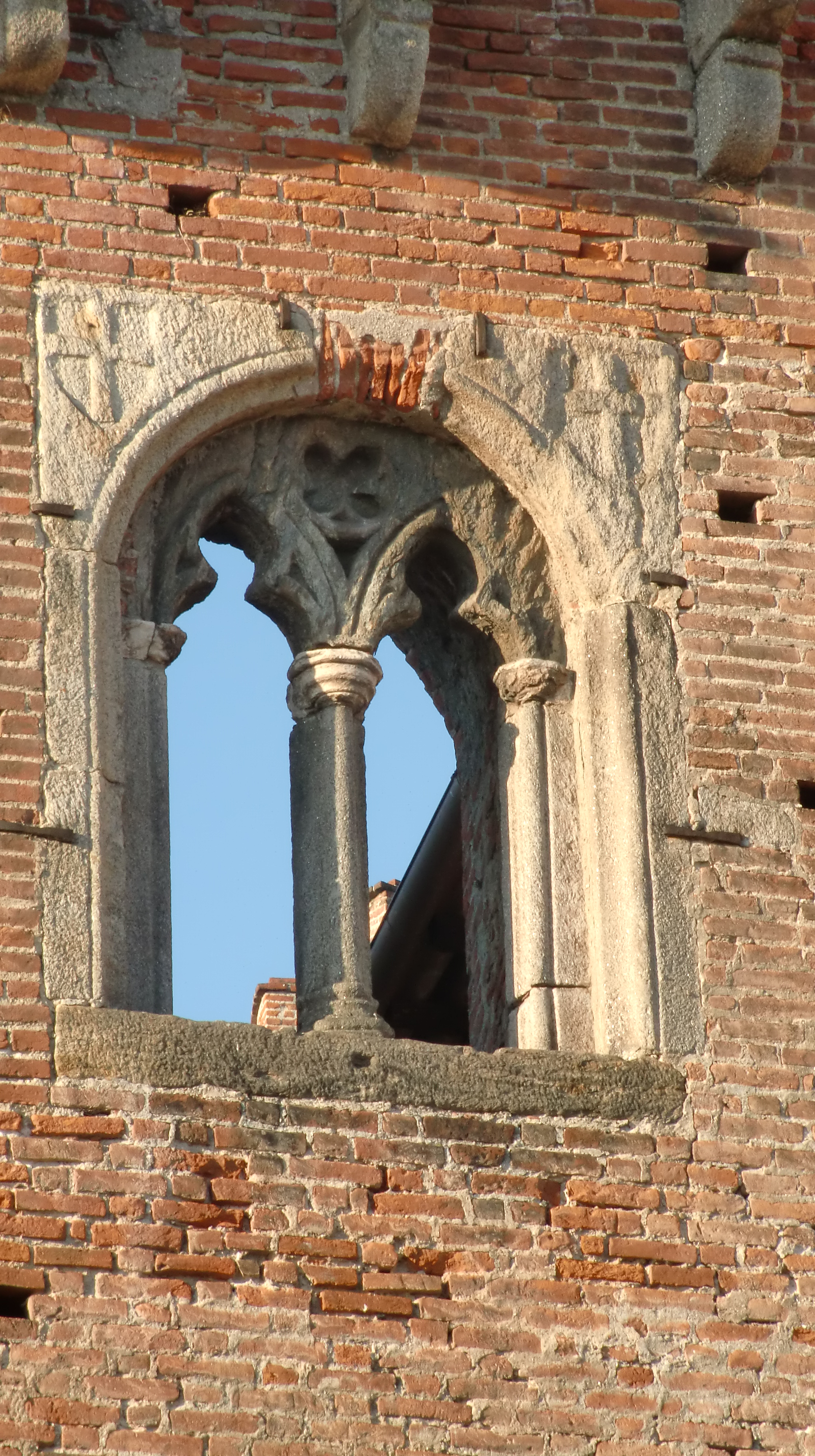
