= Rocca d'Evandro =

- Comune
- Comune di Rocca d'Evandro
- Coat of arms

- Location within Italy Location within Campania
- Coordinates: 41°23′N 13°53′E
- Country: Italy
- Region: Campania
- Province: Caserta (CE)
- Frazioni: Bivio Mortola, Camino, Campolongo, Casamarina, Centro Storico, Cocuruzzo, Mortola, Vallevona

Government
  - Mayor: Angelo Marrocco

Area
  - Total: 49.4 km^{2} (19.1 sq mi)
- Highest elevation: 960 m (3,150 ft)
- Lowest elevation: 12 m (39 ft)

Population (31 December 2010)
  - Total: 3,437
  - Density: 69.6/km^{2} (180/sq mi)
- Demonym: Roccavandresi
- Time zone: UTC+1 (CET)
  - Summer (DST): UTC+2 (CEST)
- Postal code: 81040
- Dialing code: 0823
- Patron saint: St. Roch
- Saint day: 8 May
- Website: Official website

Rocca d'Evandro is a Comune (Municipality) in the Province of Caserta in the Italian region Campania, located about 90 kilometres (56 mi) northwest of Naples and about 70 kilometres (43 mi) northwest of Caserta.

== History ==
Ancient Roman archaeological findings have been excavated in the area, such as the wine trading port at Porto di Mola. The castle, around which the village is built, appeared around the 10th century and was later bitterly contended by the local rulers. In the 14th century it was acquired by the Abbey of Monte Cassino, while, in the early 16th century, it was a fief of Ettore Fieramosca. In 1534 it was conquered by the Kingdom of Naples; the Spanish king and emperor Charles V donated it to the poet Vittoria Colonna.
