= Giovanni Stefano Ferrero =

Italian bishop and cardinal

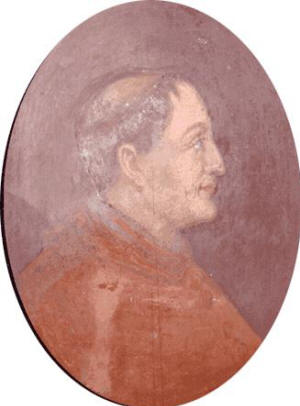
Giovanni Stefano Ferrero

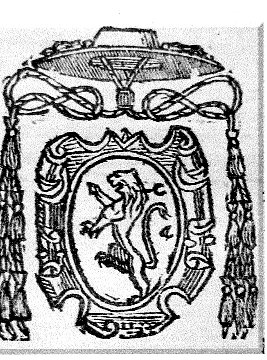
Coat of arms of Cardinal Gianstefano Ferrero

Giovanni Stefano Ferrero (1474–1510) (called the Cardinal of Bologna) was an Italian Roman Catholic bishop and cardinal.

== Biography ==
Giovanni Stefano Ferrero was born in Biella on 5 May 1474, the son of Sebastiano Ferrero and Tomena Avogadro. The Ferrero family was allied with the Acciaioli family, one of the most prominent families in the Republic of Florence. Gianstefano Ferrero's younger brother Bonifacio Ferrero also became a cardinal.

Ferrero studied canon law at the University of Padua. He then moved to Rome and became an Auditor of the Roman Rota. He next became a protonotary apostolic.

At the insistence of Blanche of Montferrat (regent for her son Duke Charles II of Savoy), Ferrero was named coadjutor bishop of Vercelli on 24 April 1493. He succeeded as Bishop of Vercelli on 16 July 1499, occupying the see until 21 January 1502. He occupied the see again from 31 October 1503 until 5 November 1509, when he exchanged it with his brother Bonifacio Ferrero.

Pope Alexander VI made him a cardinal priest in pectore in the consistory of 28 September 1500. He was transferred to the see of Bologna on 24 January 1502; he occupied this see until his death. His creation as cardinal was published on 28 June 1502 and the same day he received the red hat and the titular church of San Vitale.

He participated in both the papal conclave of September 1503 that elected Pope Pius III and the papal conclave of October 1503 that elected Pope Julius II.

On 22 December 1505 he exchanged his titulus for Santi Sergio e Bacco, a deaconry raised pro illa vice to the status of titulus.

He was Camerlengo of the Sacred College of Cardinals from January 1506 until 1507.

On 5 November 1509 he exchanged his bishopric with his brother Bonifacio, becoming apostolic administrator of the see of Ivrea; he subsequently occupied this see until his death.

He died in Rome on 5 October 1510. He was initially buried in the Basilica di San Clemente. His remains were later transferred to Biella and buried in the church of San Sebastiano, a church of the Canons Regular of the Lateran.

Catholic Church titles
Preceded by Antonio Trivulzio	Camerlengo of the Sacred College of Cardinals; 1506	Succeeded by Unknown
