= Bonifacio Ferrero =

Italian bishop and cardinal

Bonifacio Ferrero (1476–1543) was an Italian Roman Catholic bishop and cardinal.

== Biography ==
Bonifacio Ferrero was born in Biella in 1476, the son of Sebastiano Ferraro and Tomena Avogadro. He was the younger brother of Cardinal Gianstefano Ferrero.

On 6 June 1490, he was made a canon of the cathedral chapter of Vercelli Cathedral; on 3 December 1494, he became its provost.

He was Bishop of Ivrea from his election on 28 July 1497 until 5 November 1509, when he resigned in favour of his brother Gianstefano. On 5 November 1509, the day he resigned as Bishop of Ivrea, he was transferred to the see of Vercelli; he later resigned this office on 17 September 1511 in favour of his brother Agostino Ferrero. At that time, he returned to the see of Ivrea, occupying this see until 17 May 1518, when he resigned in favor of his nephew, Filiberto Ferrero.

From 1499 to 1519, Bishop Ferrero was also the Prior of San Pietro di Chambéry. He was administrator of the see of Nice 1501–04. In 1504, he became prior of Santi Giovanni e Sebastiano di Benna, a post he held until 1542. He was a participant in the Fifth Council of the Lateran.

Pope Leo X made him a cardinal priest in the consistory of 1 July 1517. He received the red hat and the titular church of Santi Nereo e Achilleo on 6 July 1517.

He participated in both the papal conclave of 1521–22 that elected Pope Adrian VI, and in the papal conclave of 1523 that elected Pope Clement VII.

He opted for the order of cardinal bishops on 12 December 1533, taking the suburbicarian see of Albano. On 5 September 1534, he opted for the suburbicarian see of Palestrina.

He participated in the papal conclave of 1534 that elected Pope Paul III. The new pope named Cardinal Ferrero papal legate in Vicenza.

He opted for the suburbicarian see of Sabina on 26 February 1535. He was Prior of San Egidio di Verrès from 1535 on. He was briefly administrator of Vercelli upon the death of his brother Agostino, from 1 September to 20 December 1536, at which time he resigned in favor of his nephew Pietro Ferrero. He was dean of the Chapel of Santissima Sindone di Chambéry from 4 June 1537.

On 28 November 1537, he opted for the suburbicarian see of Porto e Santa Rufina. At this time, he became Sub-Dean of the College of Cardinals. He was also provost of the chapter of the collegiate church of San Gervasio di Ginevra from 1537; provost of San Bernardo di Montjovet from 1537; and prior of San Pietro di Nantua from 1537. In 1540, he was papal legate to Bologna. He was also prior of San Stefano di Robbio until 1542.

Cardinal Ferrero died in Rome on 2 January 1543. He was buried in San Sebastiano fuori le mura.
