= Eastern Residential Unit =

- Unità Residenziale Est
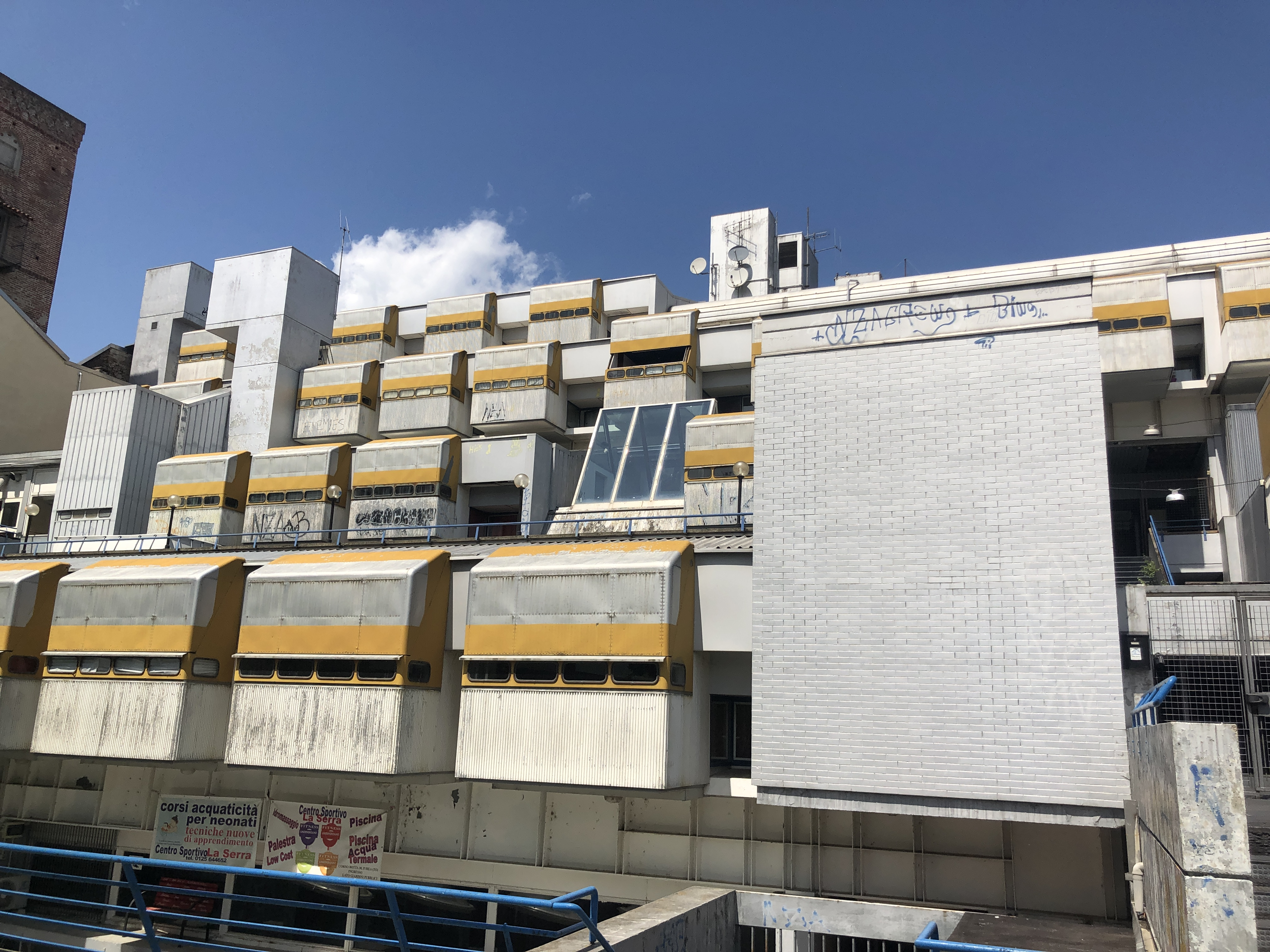
- Unità Residenziale Ovest in 2023
- Click on the map for a fullscreen view

General information
- Location: Ivrea, Italy
- Coordinates: 45°27′59.15″N 7°52′46.93″E

The Eastern Residential Unit (Italian: Unità Residenziale Est), also known as Hotel La Serra, is a building located in Ivrea, Italy, which is part of the Olivetti complex.

== History ==
The construction of the building, which was commissioned by the Olivetti company and designed by architects Igino Cappai and Pietro Mainardis, began in 1968 and was completed during the 1970s. The complex was designed to function as a conference center with a hotel, swimming pool, cinema, conference hall, and exhibition rooms.

During the preliminary excavations for the construction, significant Roman-era remains were discovered on the site, dating back to when the town of Ivrea was known as Eporedia. These findings caused delays in the construction work and were subsequently incorporated into the architectural project.

== Description ==
The building, located on Corso Botta in the center of Ivrea, is adjacent to the Tallianti Tower and overlooks the Giusiana Gardens.

Its uniqueness lies in its distinctive shape, which resembles a giant typewriter. The keys of this typewriter-like structure are represented by the various housing units that, arranged over four levels, protrude from the main body of the building.
