= Cappella dei Tre Re, Ivrea =

Roman Catholic church building in Piedmont, Italy

Tre Re
- Cappella dei Tre Re (Italian)
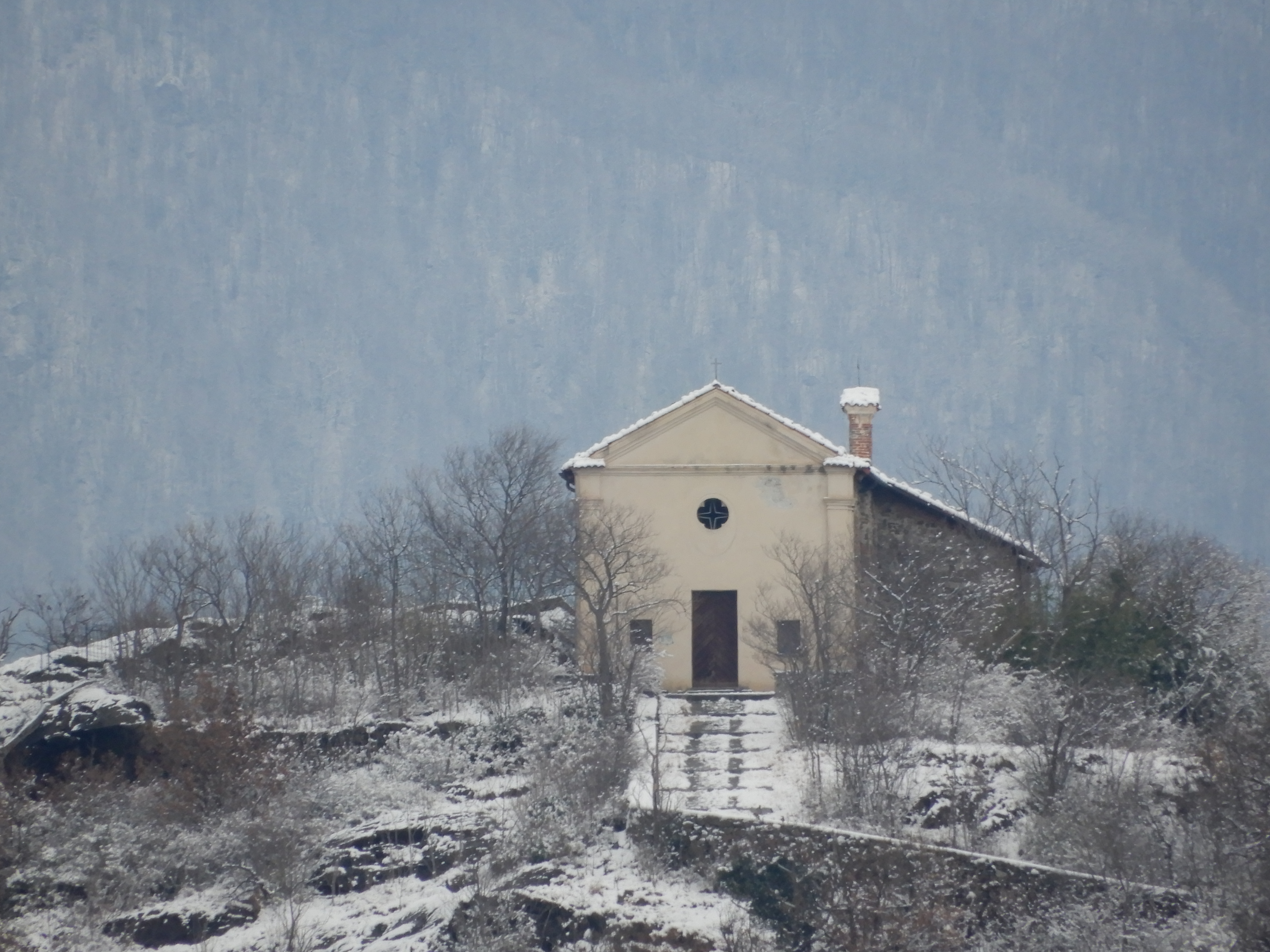
- The Cappella dei Tre Re, Ivrea in 2020
- Click on the map for a fullscreen view
- 45°28′24.14″N 7°52′57.67″E
- Country: Italy
- Denomination: Roman Catholic

Architecture
- Functional status: Active

Administration
- Archdiocese: Diocese of Ivrea

The Chapel of the Three Kings (Italian: Capella dei Tre Re) is a Roman Catholic religious building located on Viale Monte Stella, atop the mountain of the same name, in the town of Ivrea, Province of Turin, region of Piedmont, Italy. The chapel is dedicated to the three magi who attended the Nativity of Jesus.

== History ==
Originally dedicated to the Blessed Virgin Mary della Stella, a building was putatively sited here in 1220 after a visit from St Francis of Assisi. The church we see today dates from the second half of the 17th century. Traces of the Romanesque-style structure remain. The chapel once housed a late-15th-century sculptural group depicting the Adoration of the Magi, which is now housed in the Museo Civico Pier Alessandro Garda e del Canavese.

The interior walls show Renaissance frescoes that decorated the side altars, on the left wall of the nave: a triptych depicting the Madonna and Child and Saints Joseph, Roch, and Sebastian by followers of Spanzotti.
