= Pier Alessandro Garda Civic Museum =

Civic museum in Ivrea, Italy

- Museo Civico Pier Alessandro Garda
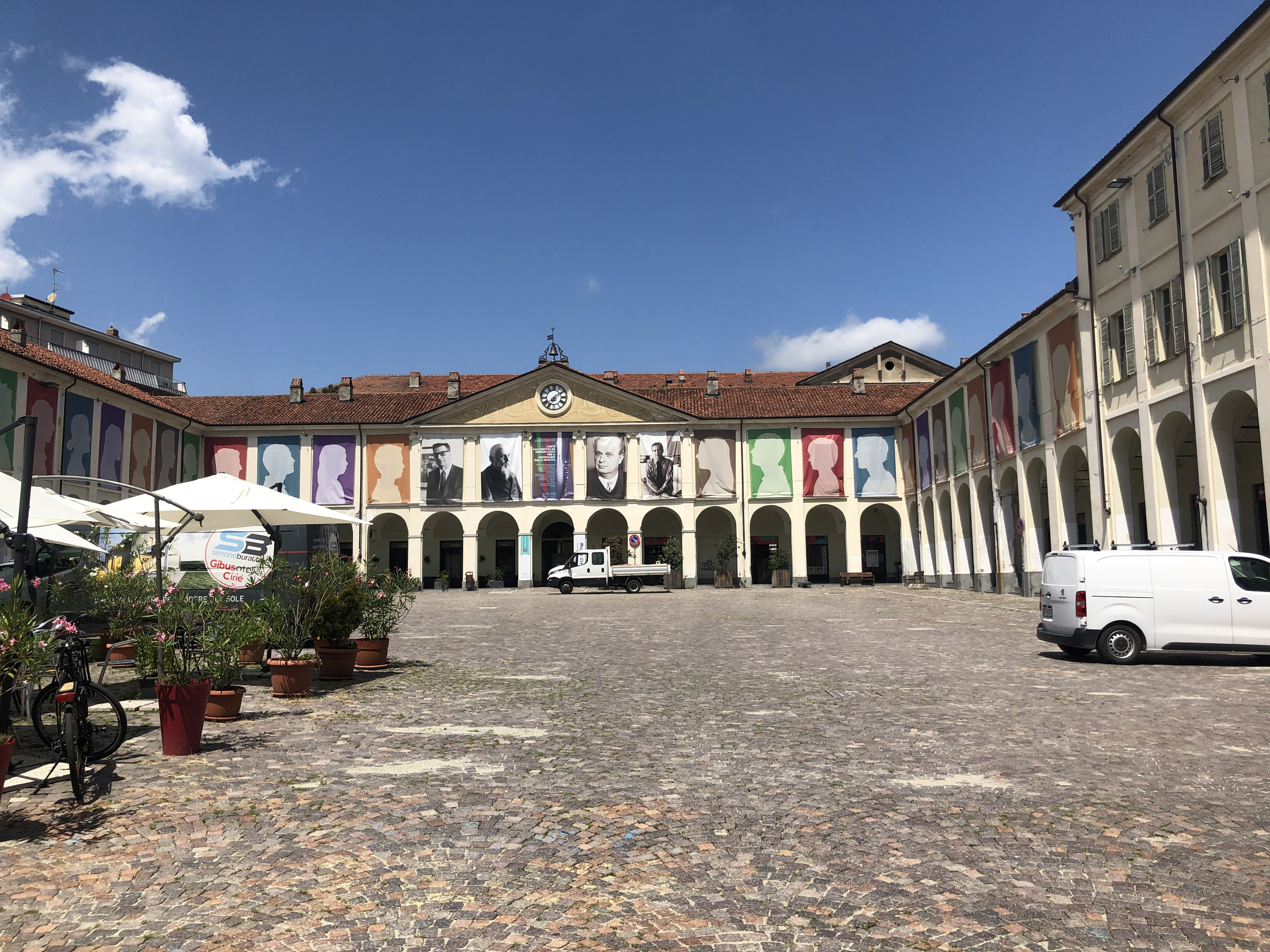
- Established: 2014
- Location: Ivrea, Italy
- Coordinates: 45.467560°N 7.878226°E
- Type: Art museum Archaeology museum
- Website: www.museogardaivrea.it

The Pier Alessandro Garda Civic Museum (Italian: Museo Civico Pier Alessandro Garda) is a museum located in Ivrea, Italy.

== History ==
The museum, named after Pier Alessandro Garda, was inaugurated on 31 January 2014, after more than thirty years of inactivity. In 2024, an exhibition on ceramic art across the collections was organized to mark the first tenth anniversary of the museum's reopening.

== Collections ==
The museum includes three main collections:

- the Archaeological Collection, which gathers evidence and artifacts from the town and surrounding area of Ivrea, ranging from the Neolithic Age to the Late Middle Ages;
- the Oriental Art Collection, stemming from Pier Alessandro Garda's personal collection during the era of Japonisme, comprising more than 500 works from Japan, as well as Count Francesco Baldassarre Perrone's collection from Palazzo Giusiana, which includes various artifacts from China and other Asian countries;
- the Croff Collection, consisting of paintings by Giovanni del Biondo, Neri di Bicci, Bergognone, Carracci, Giuseppe Palizzi, Filadelfo Simi, Pietro Annigoni, Xavier Bueno, Antonio Bueno, and Giorgio de Chirico, acquired by the municipality of Ivrea through a bequest from Lucia Guelpa.
