= Santa Marta, Ivrea =

Roman Catholic church in Ivrea, Italy

Santa Marta
- Chiesa di Santa Marta (Italian)
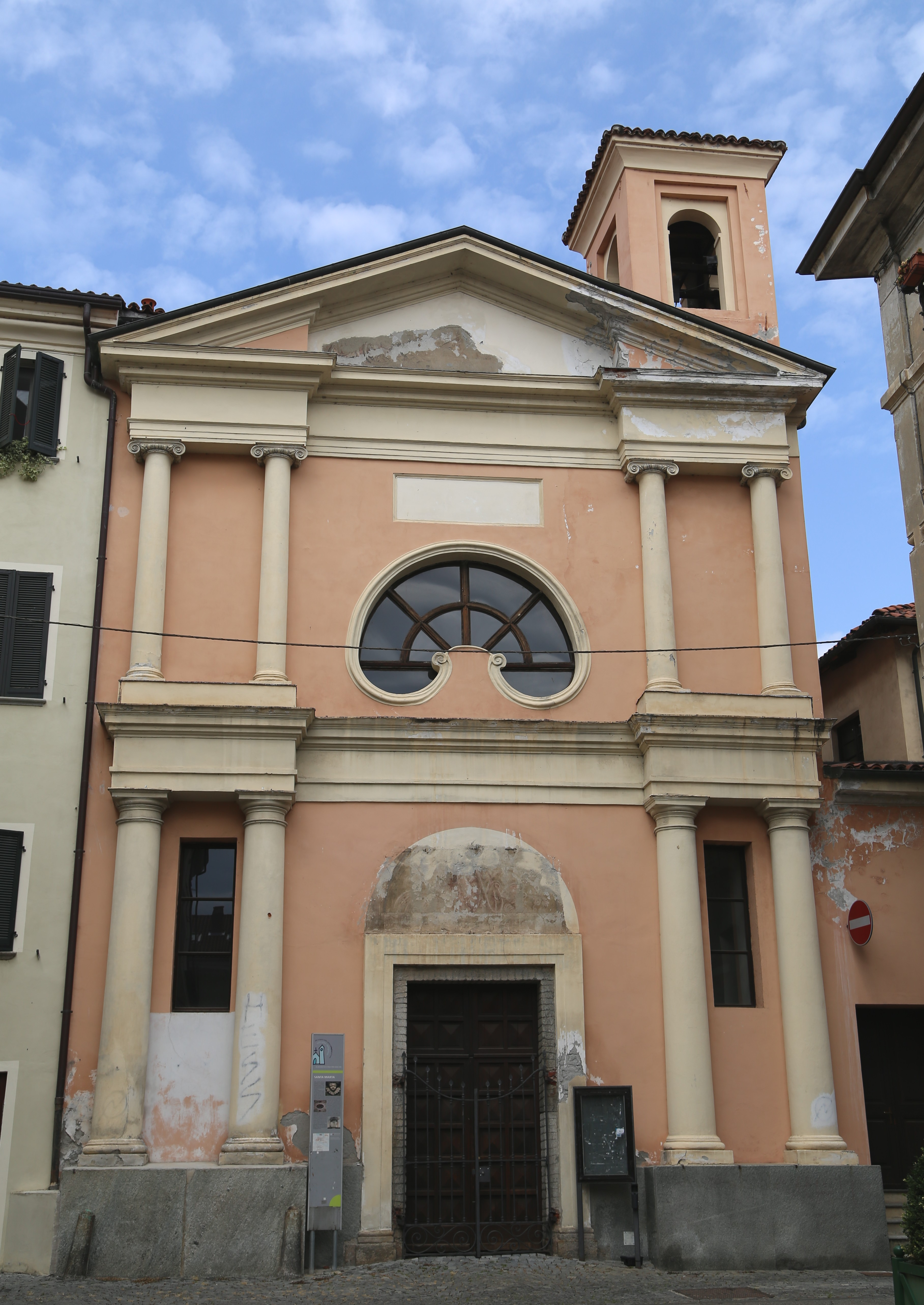
- Santa Marta, Ivrea in 2017
- Click on the map for a fullscreen view
- 45°28′02.78″N 7°52′35.26″E
- Country: Italy
- Denomination: Roman Catholic

Santa Marta is a former Roman Catholic church, now deconsecrated, in Ivrea, Province of Turin, region of Piedmont, Italy.

== History ==
The church was initially built in the late 15th-century but rebuilt at the end of the 16th century by the Confraternity of Santa Marta, a confraternity of disciplinanti (or flagellants). To the right of the entrance, they built an oratory.

Of the original decoration only one altar remains, and traces of frescoes in the presbytery and some lunettes in the walls of the oratory. Deconsecrated after World War Two, it became the property of the Commune of Ivrea in the 1970s, who converted it into a conference hall. The Baroque portal was moved to the parish church of San Bernardino in Ivrea.
