= Ivrea =

Town and comune of the Metropolitan City of Turin, Italy

Ivrea Ivrèja (Piedmontese)
- Comune
- Città di Ivrea
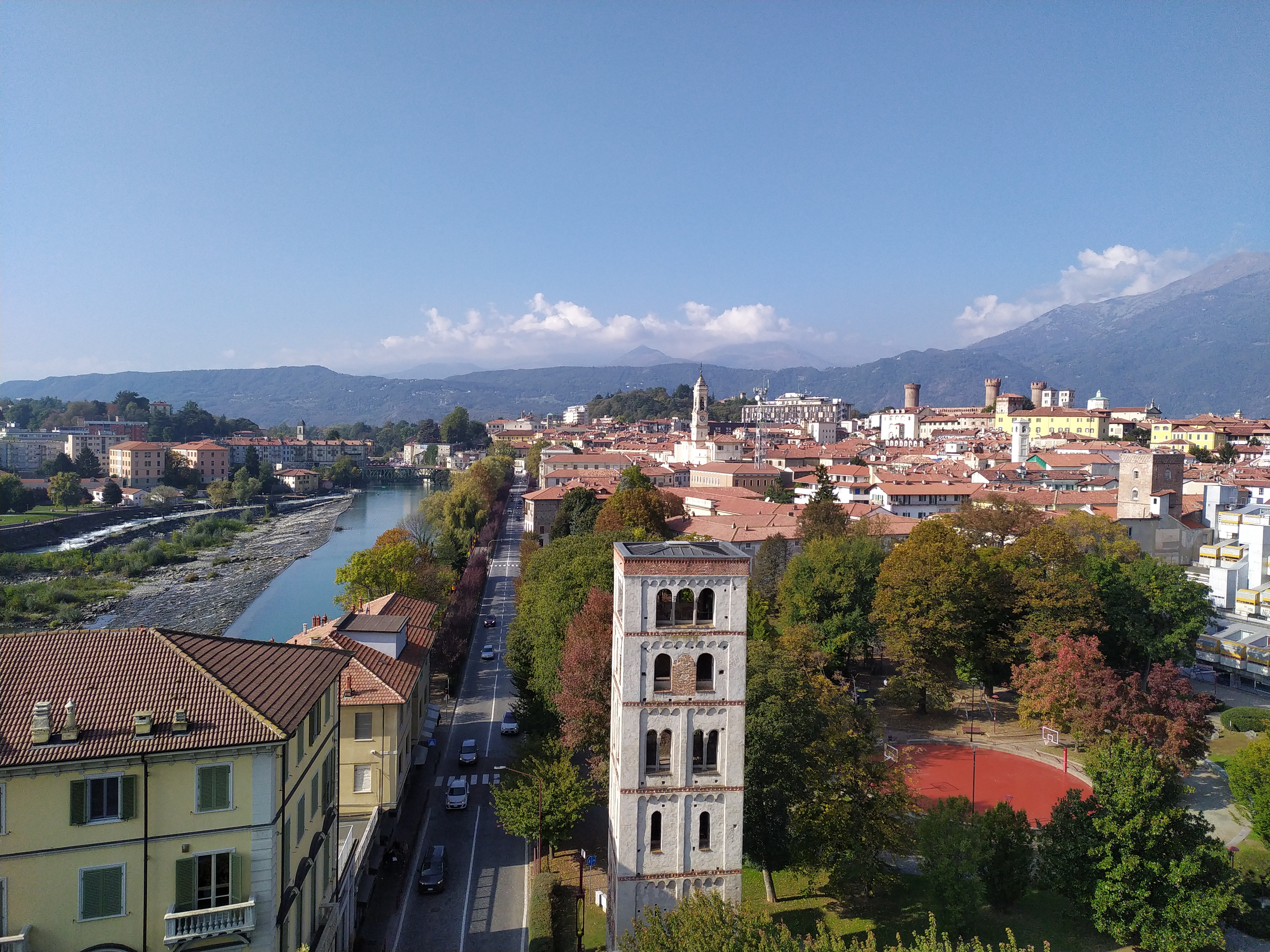
- Panorama of Ivrea

- Coat of arms

- Location within Piedmont Location within Italy
- Coordinates: 45°28′N 07°53′E
- Country: Italy
- Region: Piedmont
- Metropolitan city: Turin (TO)
- Frazioni: San Bernardo D'Ivrea, Torre Balfredo, Canton Stimozzo, Gillio, La Rossa, Meina, Moretti, Parise, Regione Campasso

Government
  - Mayor: Matteo Chiantore

Area
  - Total: 30.19 km^{2} (11.66 sq mi)
- Elevation: 253 m (830 ft)

Population (30 November 2017)
  - Total: 23,599
  - Density: 781.7/km^{2} (2,025/sq mi)
- Demonym: Eporediesi
- Time zone: UTC+1 (CET)
  - Summer (DST): UTC+2 (CEST)
- Postal code: 10015
- Dialing code: 0125
- Patron saint: Saint Sabinus
- Saint day: 7 July
- Website: comune.ivrea.to.it

UNESCO World Heritage Site
- Official name: Ivrea, an industrial city of the 20th century
- Type: Cultural
- Criteria: (iv)
- Designated: 2018
- Reference no.: 1538
- Region: Southern Europe

Ivrea (Italian: [iˈvrɛːa]; Piedmontese: Ivrèja [iˈʋrɛja]; French: Ivrée; Latin: Eporedia) is a town and comune of the Metropolitan City of Turin in the Piedmont region of northwestern Italy. Situated on the road leading to the Aosta Valley (part of the medieval Via Francigena), it straddles the Dora Baltea and is regarded as the capital of the Canavese area.

Founded by the Romans under the name "Eporedia," the town became the center of the March of Ivrea during the Middle Ages and briefly served as the capital of the Kingdom of Italy in the 11th century. It later became part of the possessions of the House of Savoy. In the 20th century, Ivrea gained international recognition as the headquarters of the Olivetti company, a pioneer in technological innovation, known for creating some of the first computers. Thanks to Olivetti, the town also became a center of architectural innovation, with the construction of several modernist buildings that reflected the era's progressive spirit. On 1 July 2018, the site which is known as "Industrial City of the 20th Century" was listed as a UNESCO World Heritage Site.

The town is well known for the Ivrea Carnival, which features the famous Orange Battle as its main event, as well as for its ancient and modern architecture, including landmarks such as Ivrea Castle, Ivrea Cathedral and the Olivetti complex. It is also a growing hub for sports, particularly canoeing and kayaking, having hosted several international competitions.

== Etymology ==
The Latin name of the city was Eporedia, likely of Celtic origin. The toponym may derive from the contraction of the Gaulish terms epo (related to the Ancient Greek hippos, meaning "horse") and reda ("four-wheeled cart"). This suggests that Ivrea was already a strategic road station for horse-drawn carriages accessing the Cisalpine region. Over time, the name evolved through various forms, including Yporegia, Iporeia, Ivreia, and eventually Ivrea.

== History ==
Prior to the foundation of the Roman colony, the principal settlement of the Salassi in the Ivrea area has been identified at Brich Appareglio, locally known as Paraj Àuta, near Pavone Canavese, approximately 3 km south of the historic centre . The site was occupied from the Final Bronze Age until the fifth century BC and, following a period of abandonment, was briefly reoccupied in the later second century BC. This phase of occupation probably ended with the foundation of the Roman colony of Eporedia in 100 BC.

The Roman colony of Eporedia was founded in 100 BC, during the sixth consulship of Gaius Marius, as recorded by Velleius Paterculus. Established as a colony of Roman citizens (colonia civium Romanorum), it stood on the left bank of the Dora Baltea, in a strategically important position at the entrance to the Aosta Valley and along the route leading to the Alpine passes. Its purpose was to control the territory of the Salassi, who were finally subjugated by Rome in 25 BC. The principal archaeological remains of the Roman city include the amphitheatre, erected during the Flavian period over the remains of an Augustan villa outside the urban perimeter; the theatre, whose remains survive beneath the historic centre; and the remains of the monumental Roman bridge across the Dora Baltea. Originally comprising ten arches, the bridge is now submerged and becomes visible only when the river level is occasionally lowered artificially.

Following the Gothic War, Ivrea may have formed part of the Byzantine defensive system in north-western Italy. Some scholars have indeed proposed identifying the city with the kástron Eourías mentioned in the Descriptio orbis Romani of George of Cyprus. During the Lombard period, Ivrea was the seat of a duchy. The Liber Pontificalis records that in 772 Tunno, Duke of Ivrea, was sent by King Desiderius to Pope Hadrian I, together with Theodicius, Duke of Spoleto, with the task of restoring friendly relations with the pontiff.

Under the Franks (9th century), Ivrea was a county capital. In the year 1001, after a period of disputes with bishop Warmund, ruler of the city, Arduin conquered the March of Ivrea. Later he became King of Italy and began a dynasty that lasted until the 11th century, when the city fell again under the bishops' sovereignty.

In the 12th century, Ivrea became a free comune, but succumbed in the first decades of the following century to the rule of Emperor Frederick II. Later, Ivrea was disputed between the bishops, the marquisate of Monferrato and the House of Savoy.

In 1356, Ivrea was acquired by Amadeus VI of Savoy. With the exception of the brief French conquest at the end of the 16th century, Ivrea remained under the House of Savoy until 1800. It was a subsidiary title of the king of Sardinia, although the only Marquis of Ivrea was Benedetto of Savoy (who later fought in the French Revolutionary wars). On 26 May 1800, Napoleon Bonaparte entered the city along with his victorious troops, establishing control that ended in 1814 after his fall.

During the 20th century, its primary claim to fame was as the base of operations for Olivetti, a manufacturer of typewriters, mechanical calculators and, later, computers. The Olivetti company no longer has an independent existence, though its name still appears as a registered trademark on office equipment manufactured by others. In 1970, about 90,000 people, including commuters from Southern Italy, lived and worked in the Ivrea area.

The Arduino electronic platform was created at the Interaction Design Institute Ivrea, and takes its name from a bar named after the historical figure of Arduin of Italy. UNESCO, when it designated the city a World Heritage Site, said that it "expresses a modern vision of the relationship between industrial production and architecture."

== Geography ==
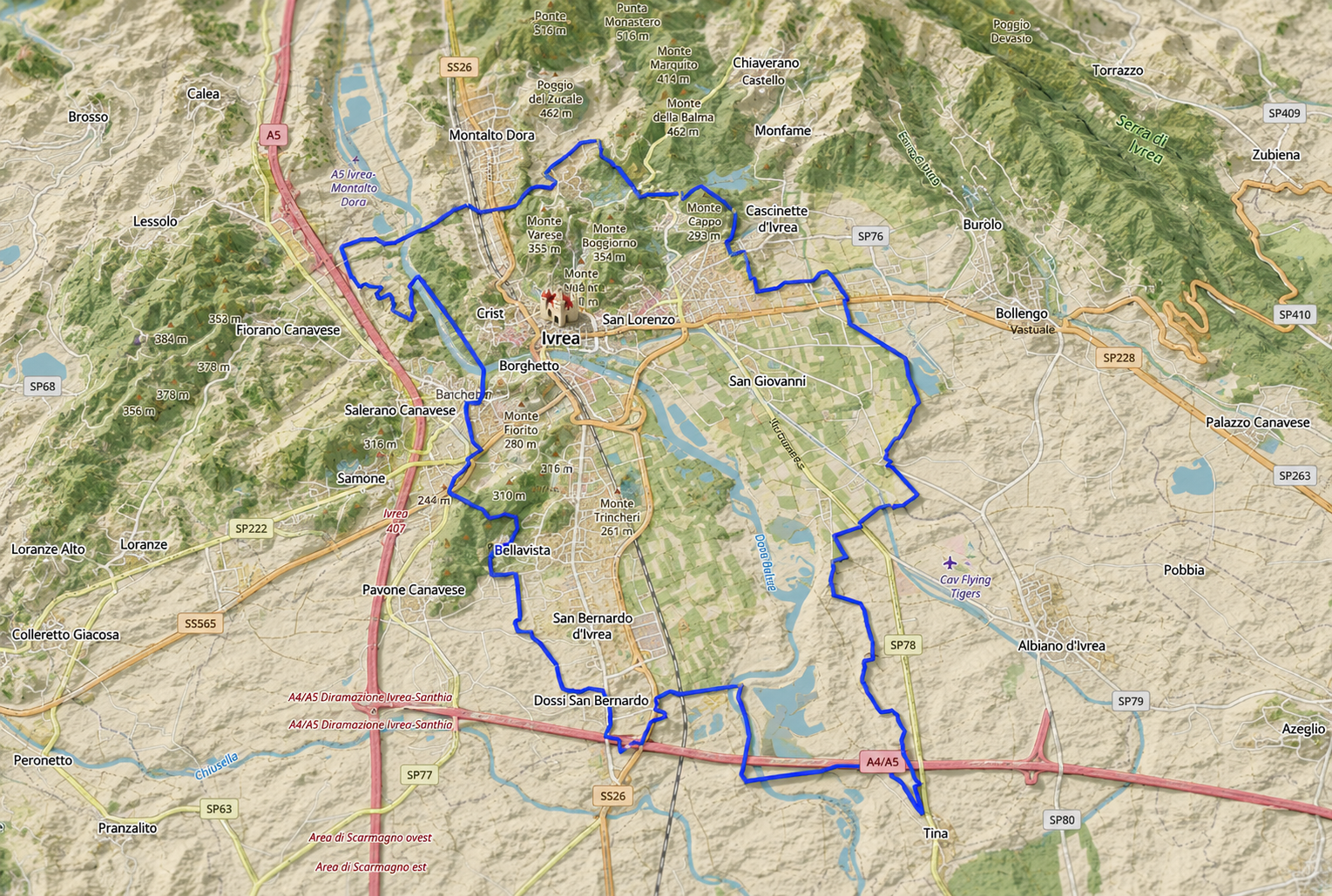
3D map with OSM data

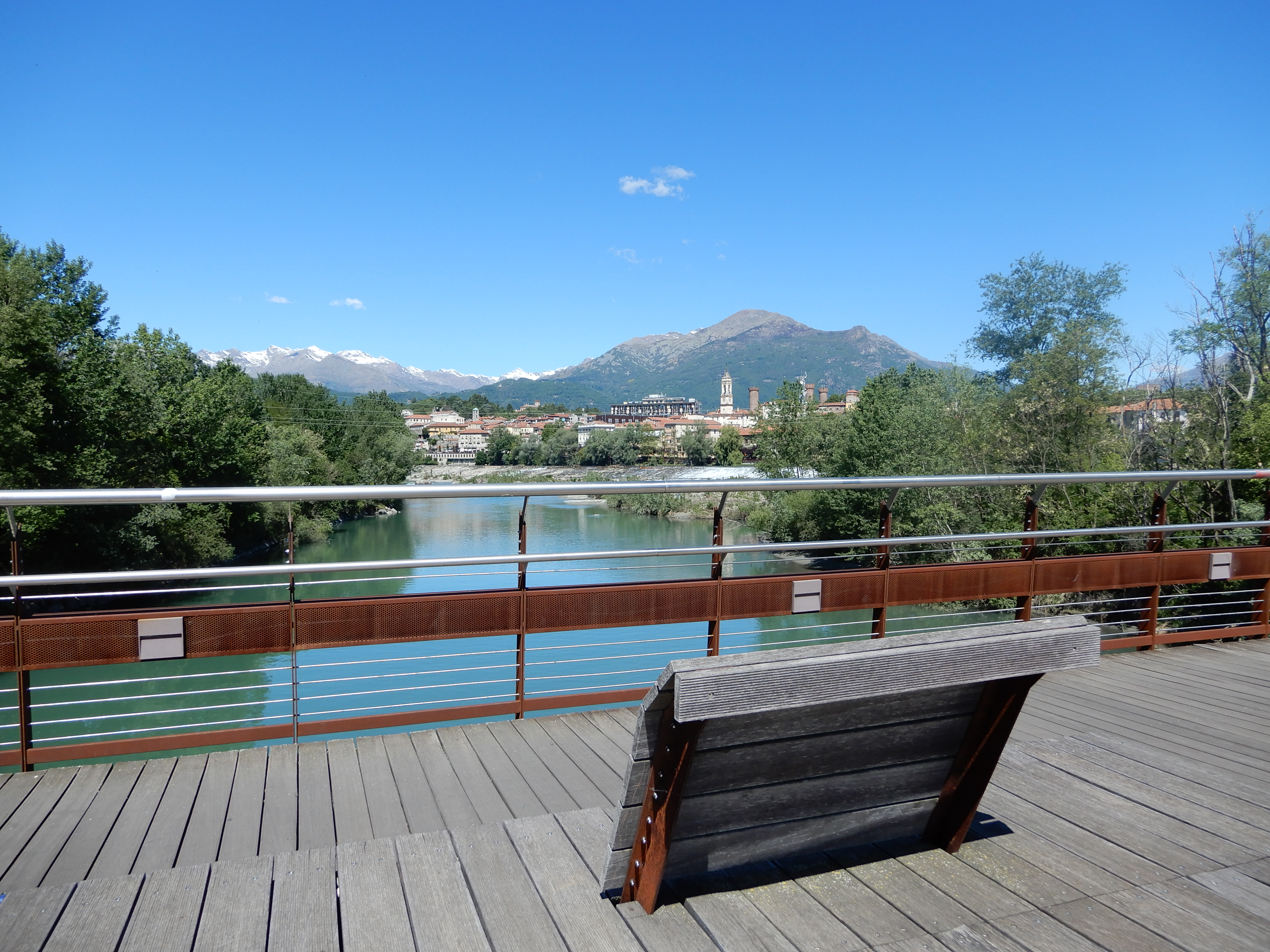
The Dora Baltea in Ivrea, viewed from the Natale Capellaro Walkway

Ivrea is situated at an altitude of approximately 267 meters above sea level, not far from the entrance to the Aosta Valley. It is crossed by the Dora Baltea river, a tributary of the Po, and is located in an area shaped by a large Pleistocene glacier, which over time transported numerous debris that formed a series of moraine hills, including the Serra d'Ivrea, which collectively form the Ivrea Morainic Amphitheatre.

Following the retreat of the last glaciation (around 9700 BC), the area became rich in numerous moraine lakes, which still surround the town to this day, including Lake Sirio, Lake San Michele (towards Chiaverano), Lake Pistono in Montalto Dora, Lake Nero (between Montalto Dora and Borgofranco), and Lake Campagna in Cascinette. A little farther away, there are also Lake Viverone (on the border with the province of Biella) and Lake Candia (in the lower Canavese area), along with several other small bodies of water scattered around.

A strategic road junction since ancient times, Ivrea provides access to Valchiusella to the west and the Aosta Valley to the north. To the east, roads lead to Vercelli and Milan, while to the northeast, a route connects to Biella, which is only 20 km away in a straight line and 35 km by road.

Ivrea's historic center climbs a hill leading to Ivrea Castle and the cathedral, while the modern part extends across the plain, occupying both banks of the Dora Baltea and the surrounding areas.

=== Climate ===
Ivrea

Climate chart (precipitation, max. and min. temperature)
J	F	M	A	M	J	J	A	S	O	N	D
43 4 −2	50 6 −1	80 10 3	115 16 8	131 21 12	114 24 16	79 27 18	102 25 17	79 22 14	107 15 8	83 9 4	41 5 0
- █ Average max. and min. temperatures in °C
- █ Precipitation totals in mm
- Source: Ufficio Idrografico del Po
Imperial conversion
J	F	M	A	M	J	J	A	S	O	N	D
1.7 39 29	2 43 30	3.2 51 38	4.5 60 46	5.2 69 54	4.5 75 61	3.1 81 65	4 78 63	3.1 71 57	4.2 60 47	3.3 49 39	1.6 42 32
- █ Average max. and min. temperatures in °F
- █ Precipitation totals in inches

The climate is temperate, mild, and relatively humid. Winters are rarely harsh, with an average of 90 nights of frost per year.

According to the Köppen climate classification, Ivrea experiences a mid-latitude humid subtropical climate (Cfa).

The average temperature in January is 1.2 °C, while in July, it reaches 23.1 °C. The average annual precipitation amounts to 982 mm, with May being the wettest month (125 mm) and January the driest, with the least rain/snow (32 mm). This precipitation pattern defines two drier seasons, summer and winter, and two wetter seasons, spring and autumn.

Notably, in recent years, summer temperatures have consistently exceeded 35 °C during the afternoon hours in July.

Climate data for Ivrea (1951-1980)
Month	Jan	Feb	Mar	Apr	May	Jun	Jul	Aug	Sep	Oct	Nov	Dec	Year
Average precipitation mm	43	50	81	106	121	141	90	104	81	116	107	50	1,089
Average precipitation inches	1.7	2.0	3.2	4.2	4.8	5.6	3.5	4.1	3.2	4.6	4.2	2.0	42.9
Source: www.isprambiente.gov.it

== Demographics ==
The town's population peaked in the 1970s, coinciding with the height of the Olivetti company. As of 2021, Ivrea had a population of 22,604. By 31 December 2020, foreign residents amounted to 2,046 people and made up 8.88% of the population, with the largest communities being from Romania (882 residents) and Morocco (281 residents).

Since the 15th century, Ivrea has also been home to a small yet significant Jewish community. Evidence of its history includes the 19th-century synagogue and the Jewish cemetery.

== Main sights ==
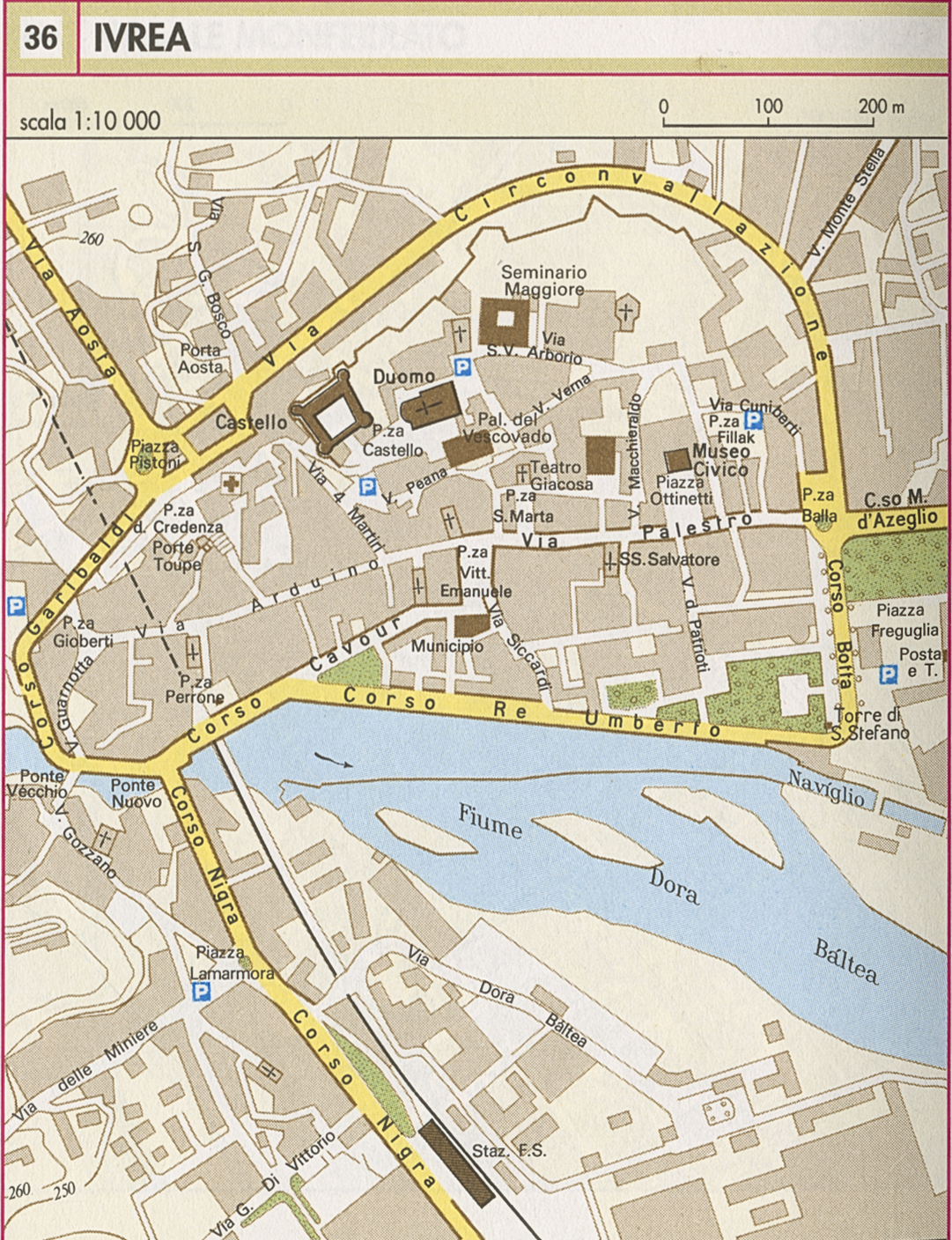
Map of city center

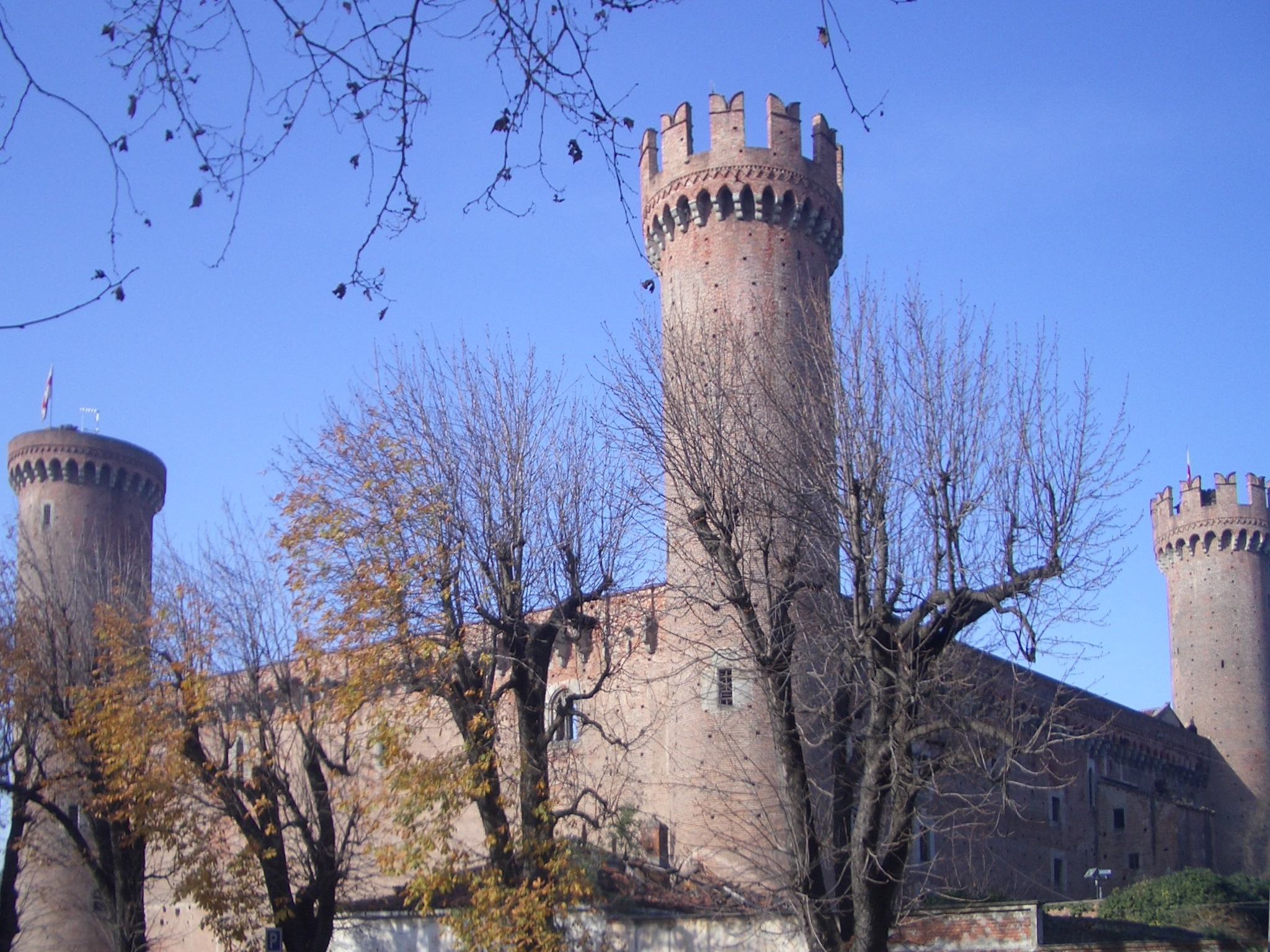
The castle (14th century)

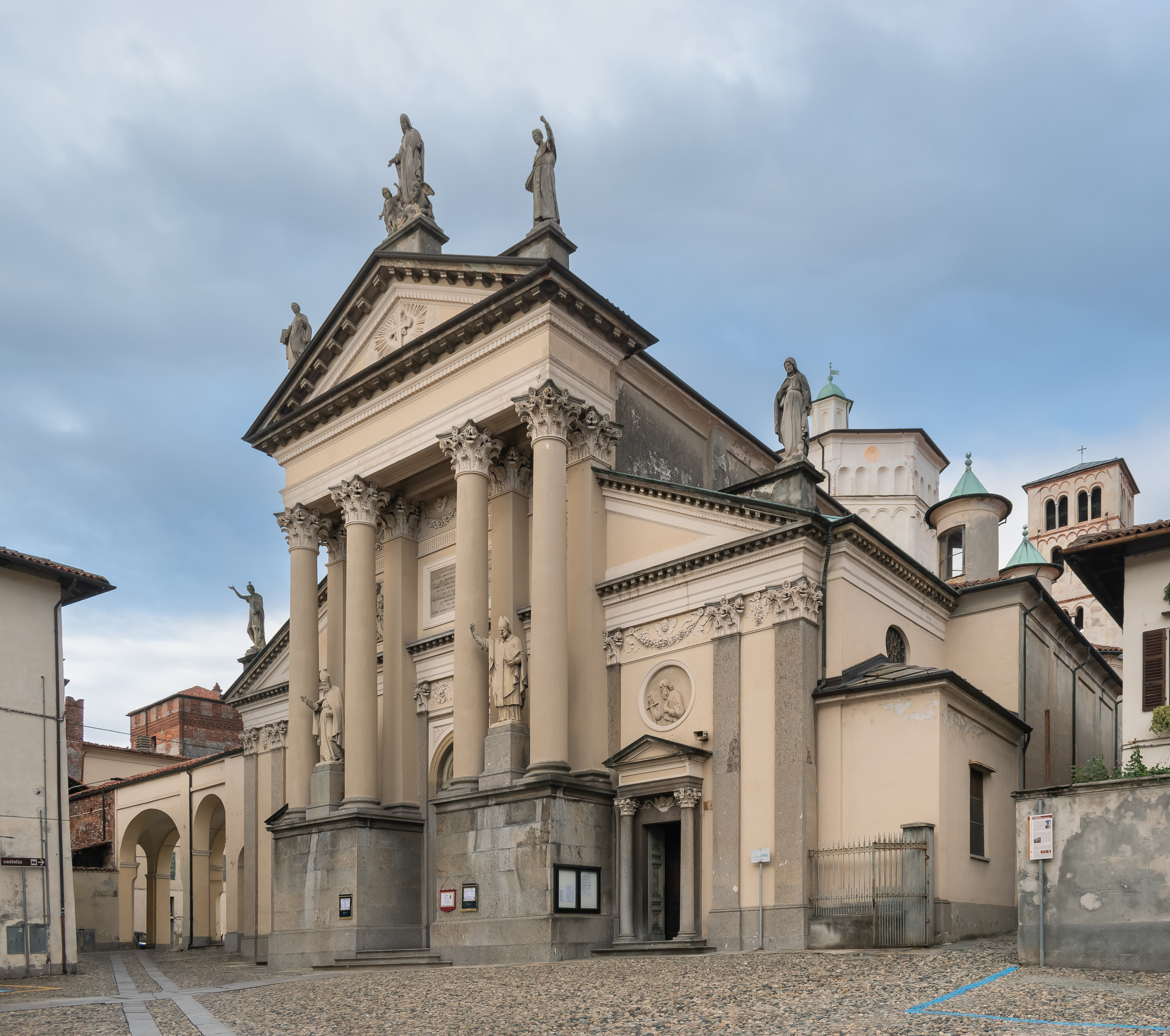
The Cathedral of Ivrea

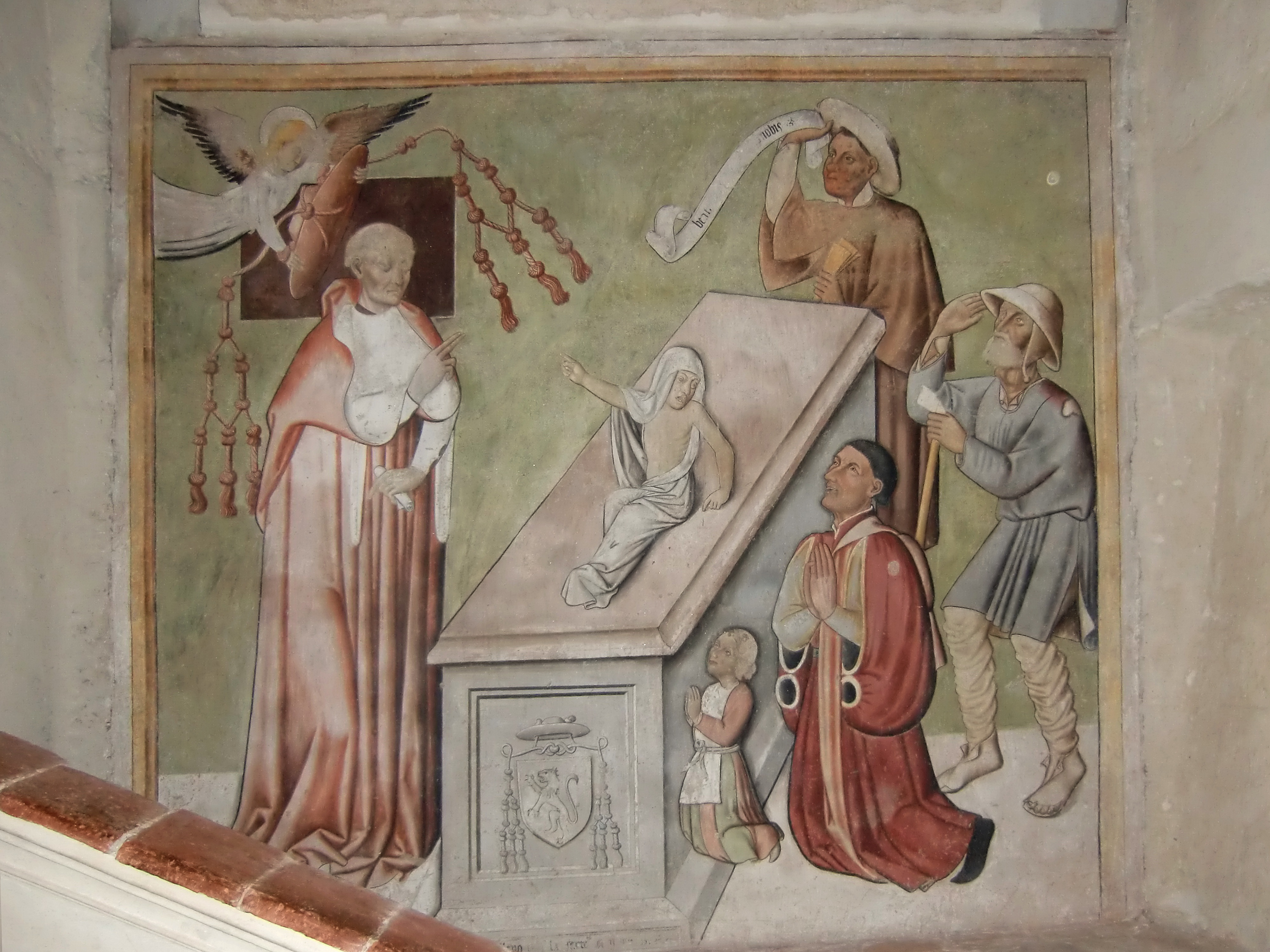
Unknown painter, second half of 15th century, A Miracle of the Blessed Pierre de Luxembourg (Cathedral)

- Ivrea Castle (1357), built during the reign of Amadeus VI of Savoy. It has a quadrangular plan in brick with four round towers at the corners. In 1676, a tower, used as an ammunition store, exploded after being struck by lightning. It was never rebuilt. Once a prison, the castle today houses exhibitions.
- Ivrea Cathedral, which originated from a church built here in the 4th century at the site of a pagan temple. Around AD 1000, it was reconstructed by bishop Warmondus in Romanesque-style: of that edifice the two bell towers, some columns, and the frescoed crypt remain. The latter houses an ancient Roman sarcophagus which according to tradition, preserves the relics of St. Bessus (co-patron of the city together with St. Sabinus). In 1785, it was rebuilt again in a Baroque style. The current neo-classical façade was built in the 19th century. One of the old frescoes of the interior is the A Miracle of the Blessed Pierre de Luxembourg (second half of 15th century). The sacristy has two altarpieces by Defendente Ferrari. The cathedral also houses the tomb of Blessed Thaddeus McCarthy.
- The Biblioteca Capitolare ("Capitular Library"), near the cathedral, houses an important collection of codices from the 7th–15th centuries.
- Church and convent of San Bernardino: small Gothic church built by the Minorites starting from 1455. It houses a cycle portraying the Life and Passion of Christ by Giovanni Martino Spanzotti (1480–1490).
- The Pier Alessandro Garda Civic Museum has some interesting archaeological findings and a collection of Japanese art pieces. It is located on the large Piazza Pietro Ottinetti.
- The Open Air Museum of Modern Architecture, inaugurated in 2001, is a show of the main edifices (some by leading architects of the time) built by Olivetti from the 1950s onwards. These include the Western Residential Unit, the Eastern Residential Unit and the Olivetti Office Building.
- The remains of a 1st-century Roman theatre, located west of the city centre. It could hold 10,000 spectators.
- The Ponte Vecchio (Old Bridge) dates back to AD 100 and leads over to Borghetto. Originally constructed of wood, it was rebuilt in stone in 1716.
- The Ivrea Town Hall (Palazzo di Città), built in 1758. It has a bell tower decorated with hemp plants, the symbol of Canavese.
- The Tallianti Tower, dating from the 12th-13th century, and Santo Stefano Tower, dating from the 11th century. This Romanesque bell tower is the remains of St. Stephen Abbey, built in 1041 by the Benedictine order.
- Church of San Gaudenzio
- Santa Marta (late 15th-century), former church
- Cappella dei Tre Re
- Sant'Ulderico, a medieval church
- Teatro Giacosa, the town's theatre, of neoclassical style
- Palazzo Giusiana, a Renaissance noble palace
- The remains of the Ivrea Roman Amphitheatre and of the Pons Maior, dating back to the 1st century AD
- Church of San Lorenzo

== Culture ==
There are two main festivals in Ivrea, both celebrated during Catholic festivity but both rooted in more ancient city traditions. One is the Carnival, its main celebrations taking place 40 days before Easter. The other is the patronal festival of St. Savino (Sabinus of Spoleto), celebrated the week of 7 July. During the latter festivity, a horse fair takes place with a carriage exhibition and horse shows.

=== Battle of the Oranges ===
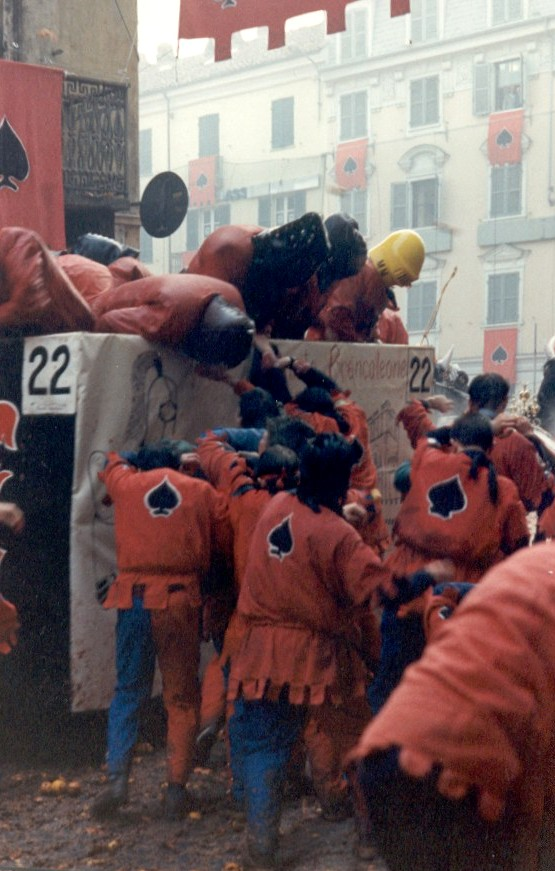
A scene from the "Battle of the Oranges".

The core celebration of Ivrea carnival centres around the Battle of the Oranges. This involves some thousands of townspeople, divided into nine combat on-the-ground teams, who throw oranges at tens of cart-based teams—with considerable violence—during the last three fat carnival days: Sunday, Monday and Tuesday. The carnival takes place 40 days before Easter and it ends on the night of "Fat Tuesday" with a solemn ceremony that involves a funeral in honour of the concluded Carnival.

A Mugnaia is chosen among the citizens' spouses. The legend has that a miller's daughter (the eponymous "Mugnaia") once refused to accept the "right" of the local duke to spend a night with each newlywed woman and chopped his head off. Today, the carriages represent the duke's guard and the orange throwers the revolutionaries. People wearing a red hat will not be considered part of the revolutionaries, and therefore will not have oranges thrown at them.

The origin of the tradition of throwing oranges is not well understood, particularly as oranges do not grow in the foothills of the Italian Alps and must be transported from Sicily. In 1994, an estimate of 265,000 kilograms (584,000 lb) of oranges was brought to the city, mainly coming from the leftovers of the winter crop in southern Italy.

=== Cuisine ===
Eporedian cuisine is particularly appreciated for its desserts, including traditional Eporediesi biscuits, and patisserie cakes like Torta 900 and Polenta d'Ivrea. Fagioli grassi (Piedmontese: faseuj grass) is another traditional dish from the town.

=== Sports ===
The town's football club, A.S.D. Montalto Ivrea, currently plays in Promozione Piemonte.

The Ivrea Rugby Club plays in C1 Piemontese.

Ivrea was a host for the 2016, 2017, and 2024 Canoe Slalom World Cup, held at the Ivrea Whitewater Stadium.

== Twin towns ==
Ivrea is twinned with:

- Rădăuți, Romania
- Monthey, Switzerland
- Lüneburg, Germany

== See also ==
- Natale Capellaro Walkway, a footbridge over the Dora Baltea in Ivrea
- Ivrea Morainic Amphitheatre, a moraine relief
