= Sant'Ulderico, Ivrea =

Church building in Italy

Sant'Ulderico
- Chiesa di Sant'Ulderico (Italian)
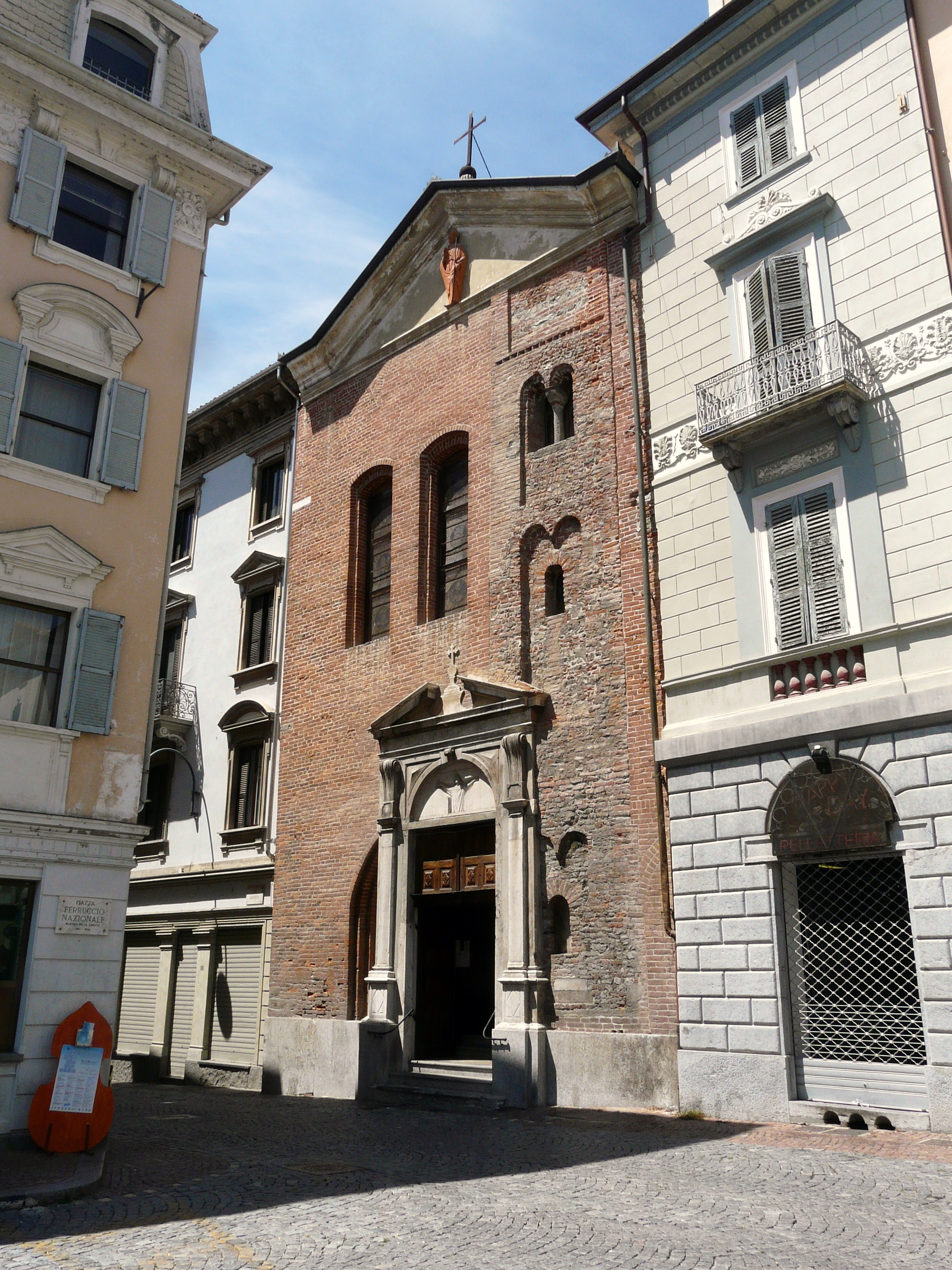
- Sant'Ulderico, Ivrea in 2010
- Click on the map for a fullscreen view
- 45°28′01.1″N 7°52′32.3″E
- Country: Italy
- Denomination: Roman Catholic

Architecture
- Functional status: Active
- Style: Romanesque architecture

Administration
- Diocese: Diocese of Ivrea

Sant'Ulderico is a Roman Catholic church located in Ivrea, Italy.

== History ==
The church was built in the years that immediately followed the canonization of Ulrich of Augsburg, which occurred in 993. The building stands on the spot where the saint performed a miracle during his stay in Ivrea in 971, resurrecting the young son of the owners of the inn where he was lodged.

== Description ==
The church is located in Piazza Ferruccio Nazionale, the main square of the town, opposite the Ivrea Town Hall and next to the Palazzo della Congregazione di Carità. The brick façade incorporates the old Romanesque bell tower of the original building.

The main altar is surmounted by a large altarpiece depicting the Trinity with Saint Michael and other saints.
