= Ivrea Roman Amphitheatre =

Ancient Roman amphitheater in Ivrea, Italy

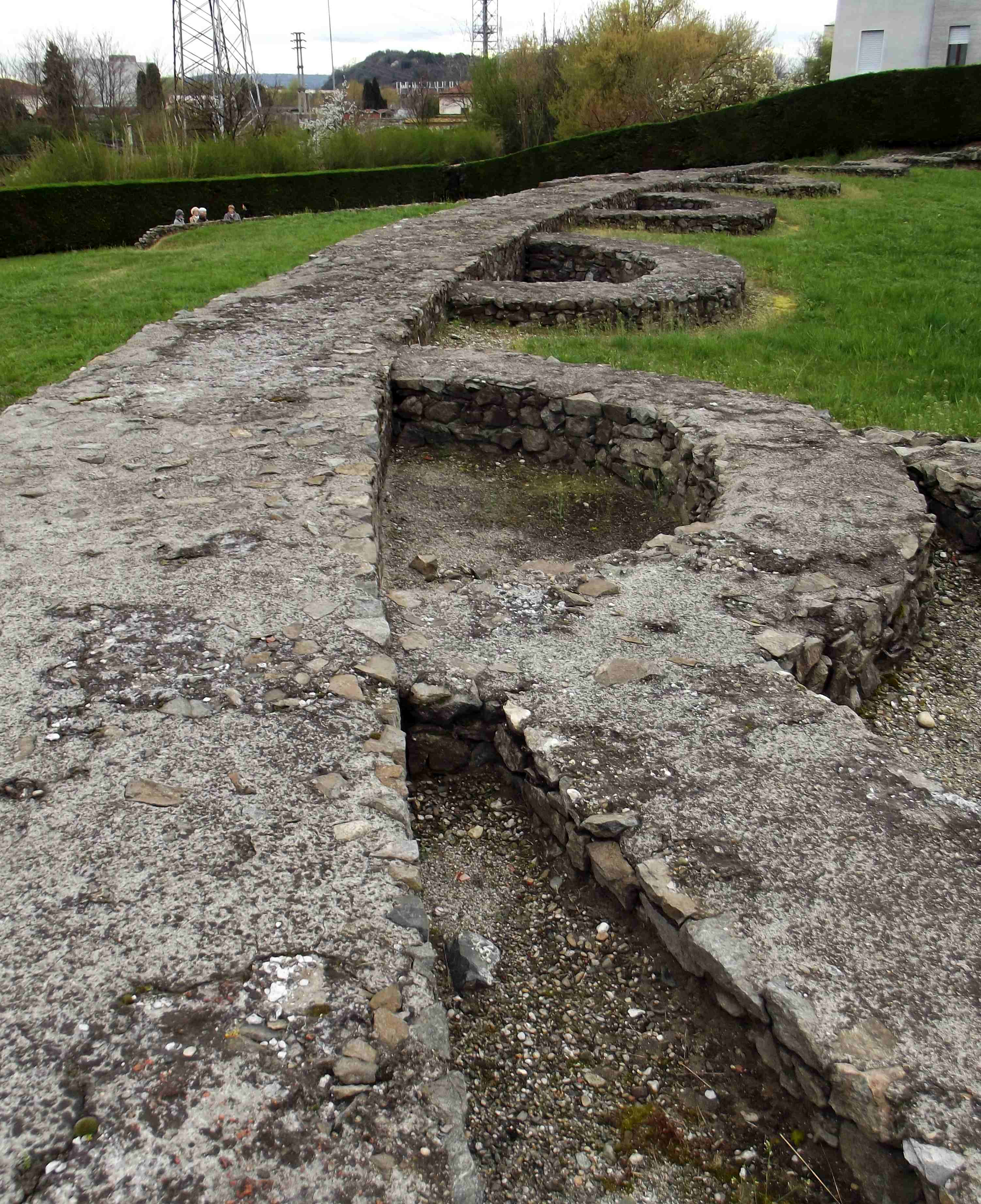
- Ivrea Roman Amphitheatre in 2014
- Interactive map of Ivrea Roman Amphitheatre
- 45°28′04″N 7°53′16″E
- Type: Amphitheatre
- Location: Ivrea, Italy

History
- Built: 1st century AD

The Ivrea Roman Amphitheatre (Italian: Anfiteatro romano di Ivrea) is a Roman amphitheatre located in Ivrea, Italy.

== History ==
The amphitheatre of the Roman colony of Eporedia (modern-day Ivrea) was built in the mid-1st century AD along the road leading to Vercelli. It is believed that it could hold more than ten thousand spectators. To build it, a pre-existing villa had to be partially demolished, with some of its walls incorporated into the structure of the amphitheatre.

== Description ==
The structure has an elliptical plan with a 65-metre major axis, with entrances for spectators at both ends. An underground chamber located in the middle of the arena and connected by an underground corridor to the service areas located beneath the cavea allowed the movement of stage equipment and animals.

== See also ==
- Pons Maior
