= San Lorenzo, Ivrea =

San Lorenzo
- Chiesa di San Lorenzo (Italian)
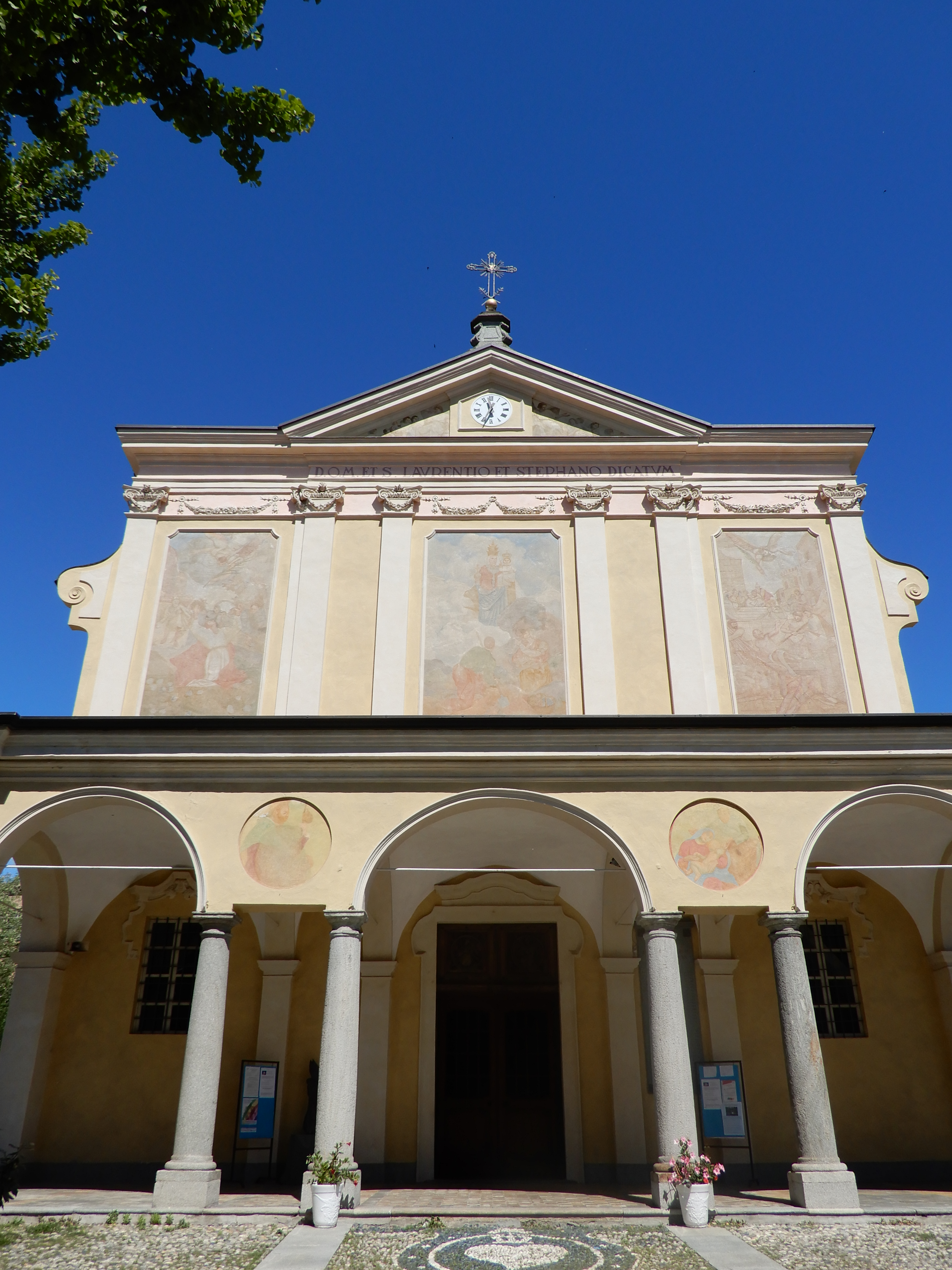
- San Lorenzo, Ivrea in 2021
- Click on the map for a fullscreen view
- 45°28′06.42″N 7°53′05.25″E
- Country: Italy
- Denomination: Roman Catholic

Architecture
- Functional status: Active

Administration
- Diocese: Diocese of Ivrea

San Lorenzo is a Roman Catholic church located in Ivrea, Italy.

== History ==
The parish of the church is one of the oldest in Ivrea, dating back to around the year 1000. Initially entrusted to the monks of Santa Croce, the church suffered destruction during the wars of 1544 and 1704. It was rebuilt and completed in 1721, though it underwent numerous additional modifications over time. The façade, built in 1795, was designed by Giuseppe Martinez, while the bell tower, designed by architect Bellono, was constructed in 1808. Later, in 1881, the structure was expanded by extending the nave.

== Description ==
The church features a three-nave structure. The façade is characterized by a portico with three arches.

== Gallery ==
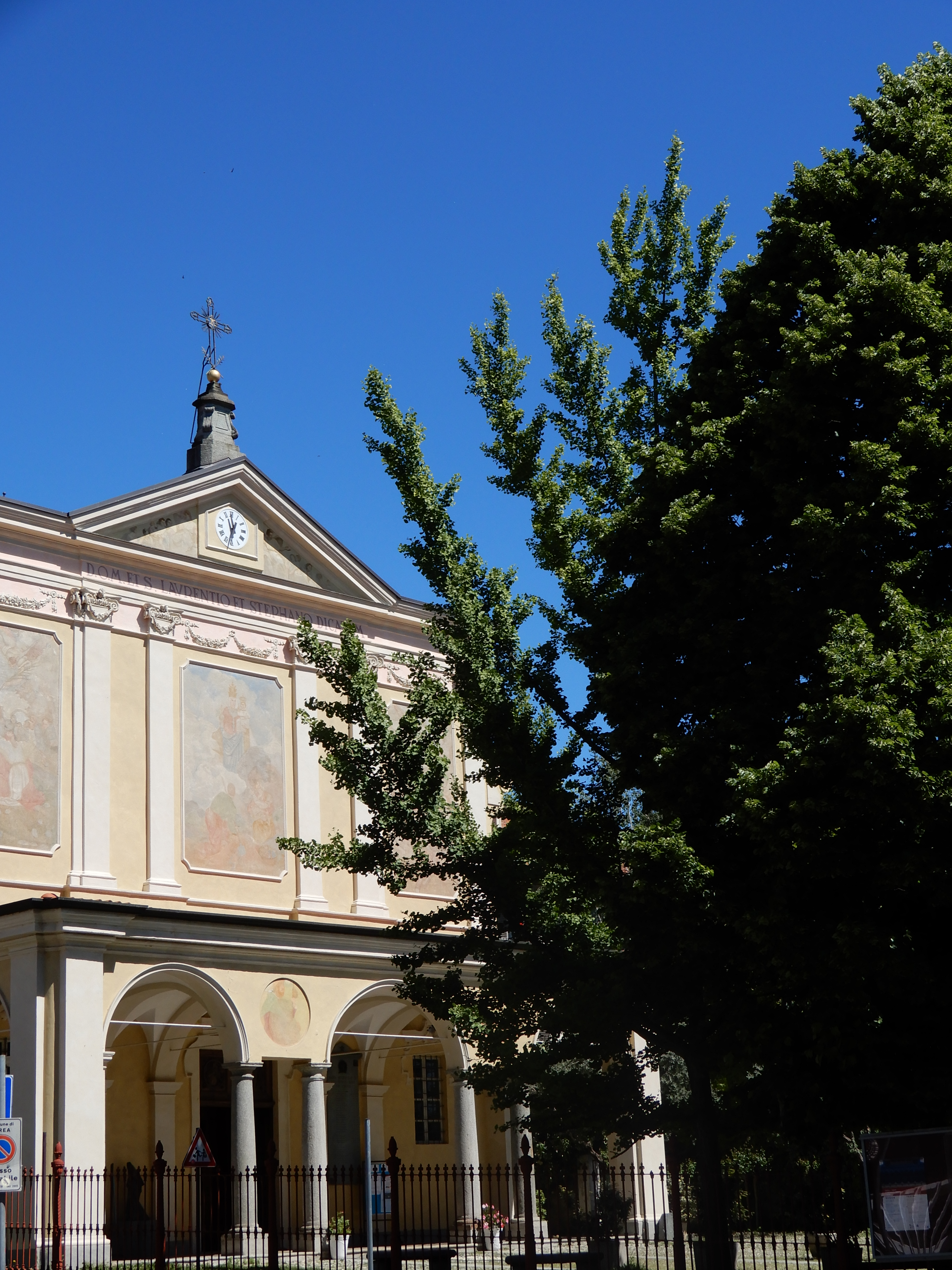

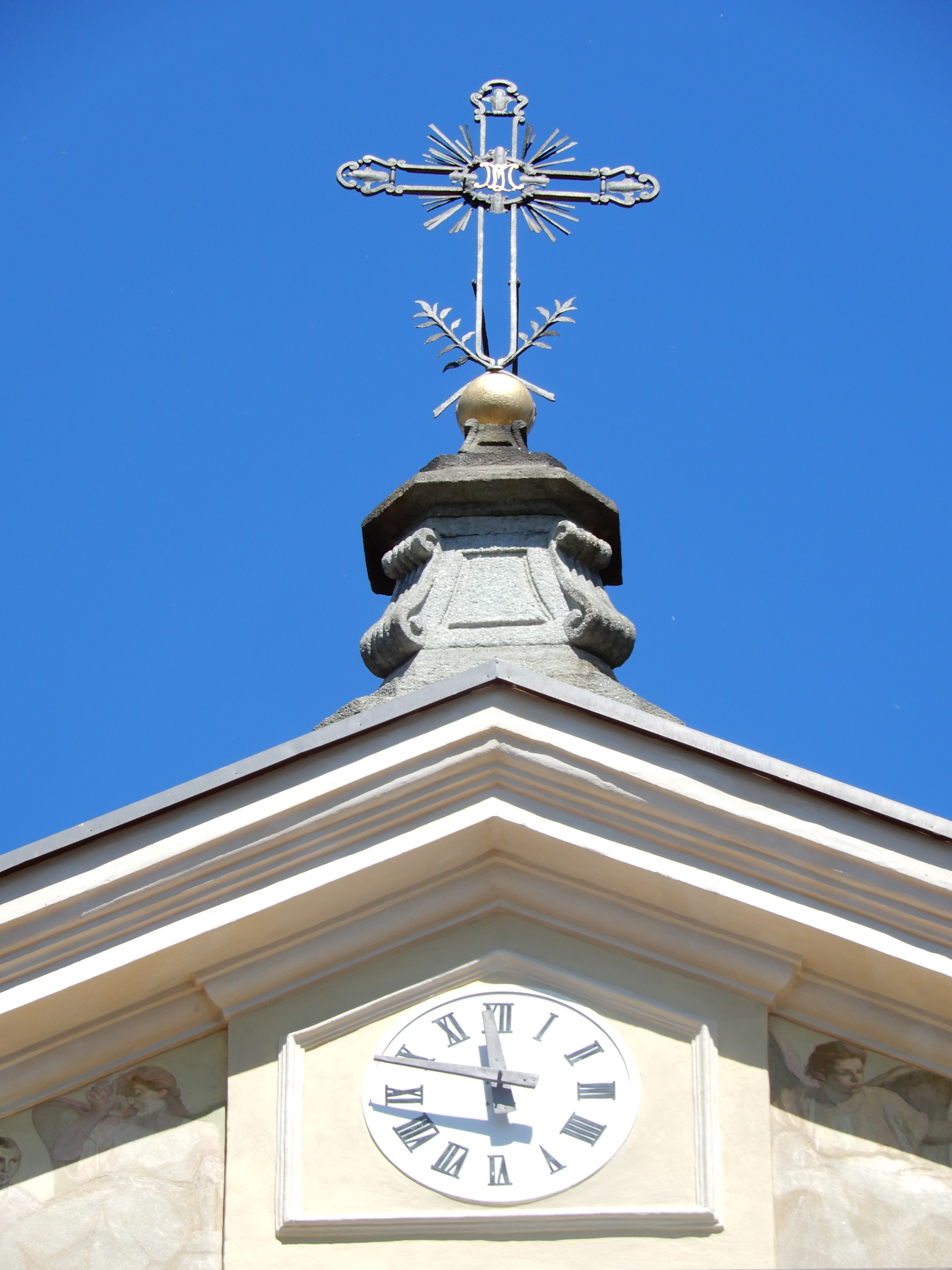

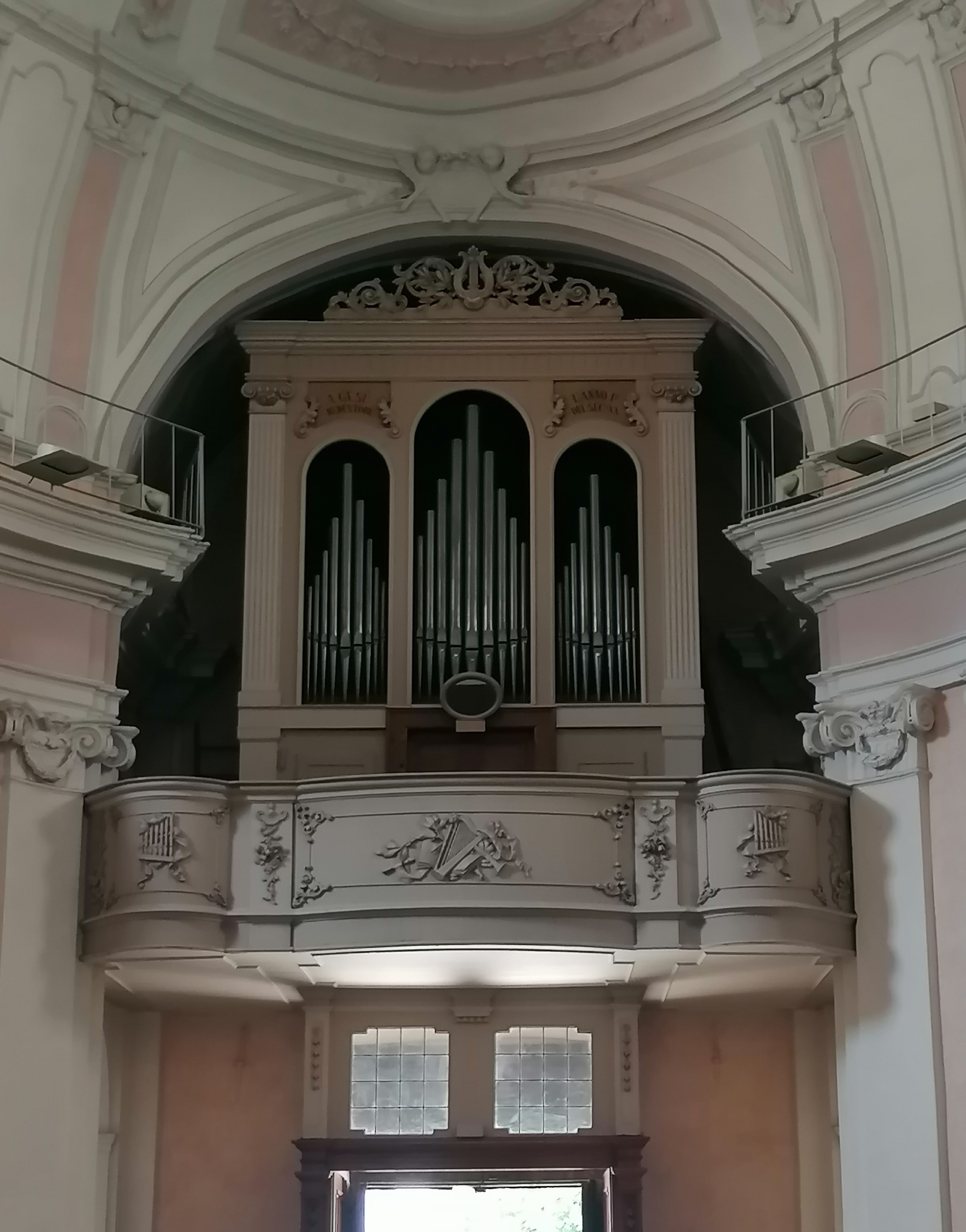
