= Pons Maior =

Ancient Roman bridge in Ivrea, Italy

- Ruins in the Dora Baltea riverbed
- Coordinates: 45°27′51″N 7°52′38″E
- Crosses: Dora Baltea
- Locale: Ivrea, Italy

Characteristics
- Design: Arch bridge
- No. of spans: 10

Location
- Click on the map for a fullscreen view

The Pons Maior was an ancient Roman bridge in Ivrea, Italy.

== History ==
The bridge was presumably built in the 1st century AD as a monumental structure, but collapsed due to a severe flood at an unknown date, most likely not long after its construction. The bridge was built as the town's second link over the Dora Baltea river, in addition to the original and still existing Ponte Vecchio, built at the narrowest point of the riverbed.

The remains of the Pons Maior first came to light during the 1977 flood. They were subsequently examined and documented by the Archaeological Superintendency of Piedmont, in collaboration with the Underwater Archaeology Technical Service of the Ministry of Cultural Heritage and the Canavese Archaeological Group, during the restoration works on the riverbanks carried out following the exceptional flood of 1993.

== Description ==
The ancient bridge, located approximately 500 m (1,600 ft) downstream from the Ponte Vecchio, stood at a site considerably less suitable for such a structure due to the width and sandy nature of the riverbed. It measured approximately 150 m (490 ft) in length and consisted of ten arch spans, the four central ones being the widest. Each arch span was made up of five large parallel arches constructed from stone fragments and filled with a cast conglomerate material. The arches rested on eleven concrete piers faced with stone blocks. These were supported by wooden piles with iron tips, driven into the sandy riverbed. The bridge carried a paved roadway approximately 5.5 m (18 ft) metres wide, flanked by narrow side pavements measuring around 45 cm (1.48 ft) in width. The roadway was protected by stone parapets carved in the shape of bulls.

== See also ==
- Ivrea Roman Amphitheatre
