= Teatro Giacosa =

Theatre in Ivrea, Italy

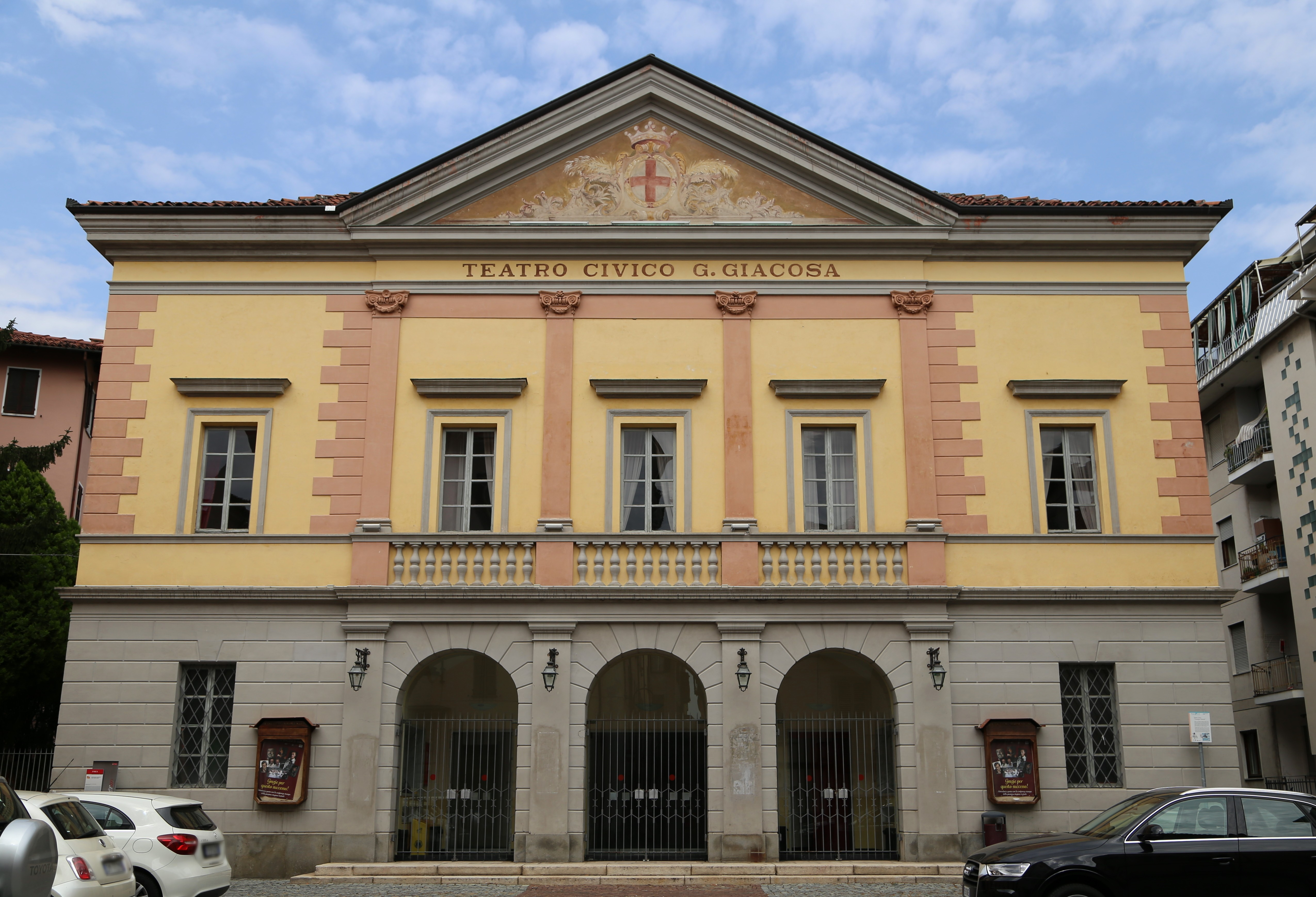
- Teatro Giacosa in 2017
- Interactive map of Teatro Giacosa
- Address: Piazza Teatro 1 Ivrea; Italy
- Coordinates: 45°28′03.87″N 07°52′38.63″E
- Capacity: 500

Construction
- Opened: 1834
- Architect: Maurizio Storero

Website
- Il Contato del Canavese - Teatro Giacosa

Teatro Giacosa (officially: Teatro Civico Giuseppe Giacosa) is a theatre located in Ivrea, Italy.

== History ==
In 1829, the municipal administration of Ivrea entrusted architect Maurizio Storero with the task of designing a new city theatre. Storero chose to adhere to the then-customary model of the so-called teatro all'italiana, consisting of a horseshoe-shaped hall with stacked boxes. Construction works took place between 1833 and 1834. The inauguration took place on 5 July 1834 during the celebrations of the patronal feast of St Sabinus with three opera performances: Giulietta e Romeo and La gioventù di Enrico IV, both by Nicola Vaccai, and Il nuovo Figaro by Luigi Ricci.

== Description ==
The building, located in the historic centre of Ivrea, has a neoclassical façade featuring a large rectangular pediment where the city coat of arms is painted.
