= San Bernardino, Ivrea =

Roman Catholic church in Ivrea, Italy

San Bernardino
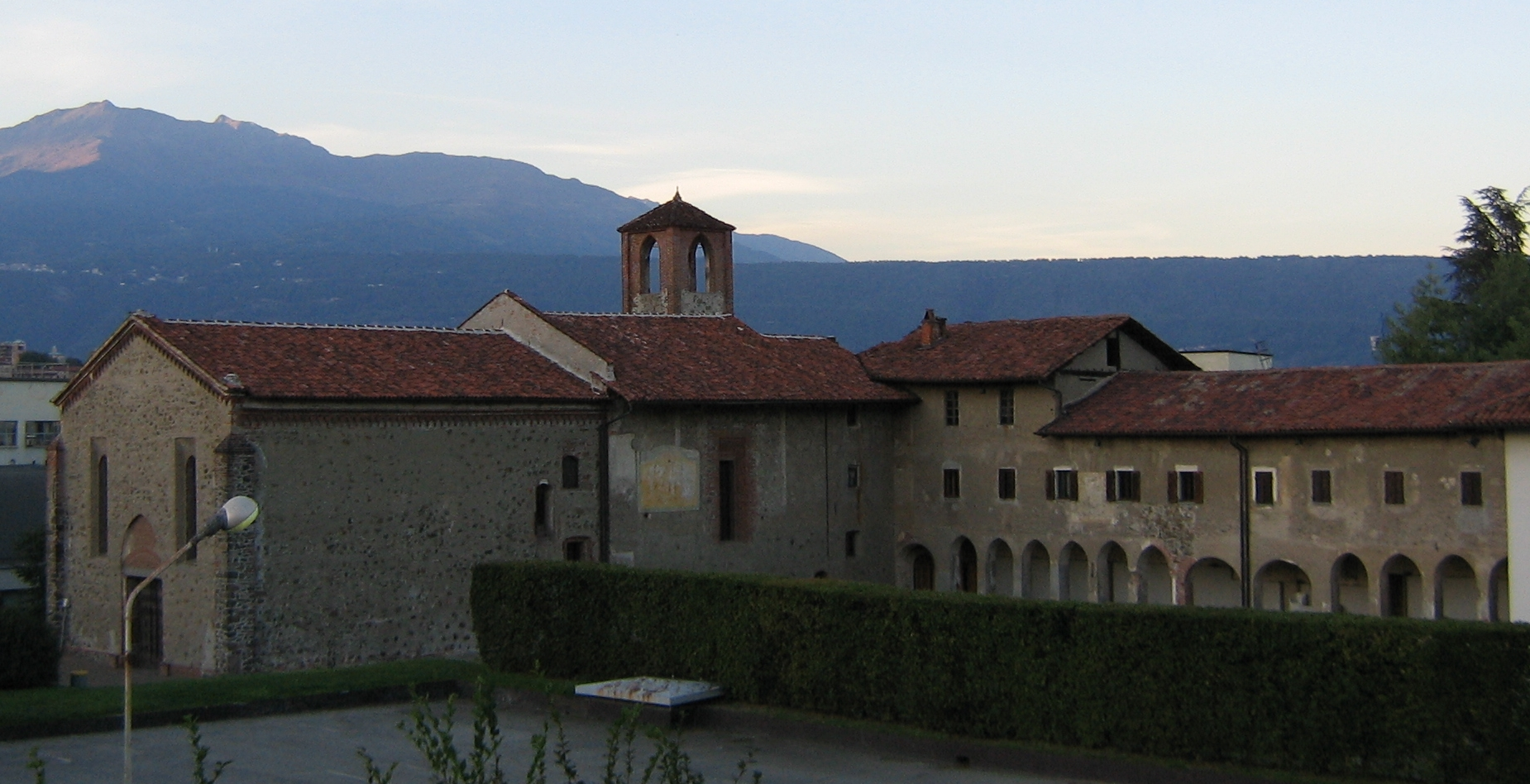
- San Bernardino
- Click on the map for a fullscreen view
- 45.459005°N 7.875155°E
- Country: Italy
- Denomination: Roman Catholic

Architecture
- Style: Renaissance architecture

Administration
- Archdiocese: Diocese of Ivrea

San Bernardino is a Roman Catholic church and convent located on Via Monte Navale in the town of Ivrea, Province of Turin, region of Piedmont, Italy.

== History ==
The convent was built between 1455 and 1465 and dedicated to San Bernardino da Siena, who reputedly preached in Ivrea in 1418. The church was completed by 1457. In 1465, the original arches of the Gothic façade was enveloped by new construction, and two of the arches became part of new chapels. By the beginning of the 19th century, the convent had been requisitioned by occupying troops and by 1805, the property was deconsecrated and in 1907 made by engineer Camillo Olivetti into a residence. Between 1955 and 1958, major reconstruction modified the appearance of the convent, to house the headquarters of the social services of the Olivetti company: but restoration work was performed on the church.

The church wall houses the Renaissance fresco cycle of the Life and Passion of Christ (1480–1490) by Giovanni Martino Spanzotti. The work consists of twenty scenes placed around the large panel of the Crucifixion; with central spandrels depicting the Last Judgment and Hell. The pilasters have images of St Bernardino of Siena and Christ as "Imago Pietatis", and two lateral spandrels depict the Expulsion from Paradise and Purgatory. The frescoes in back of the lateral chapels are attributed to Nicolas Robert, court painter of Amedeo IX of Savoy.
