= Tallianti Tower =

- Torre dei Tallianti
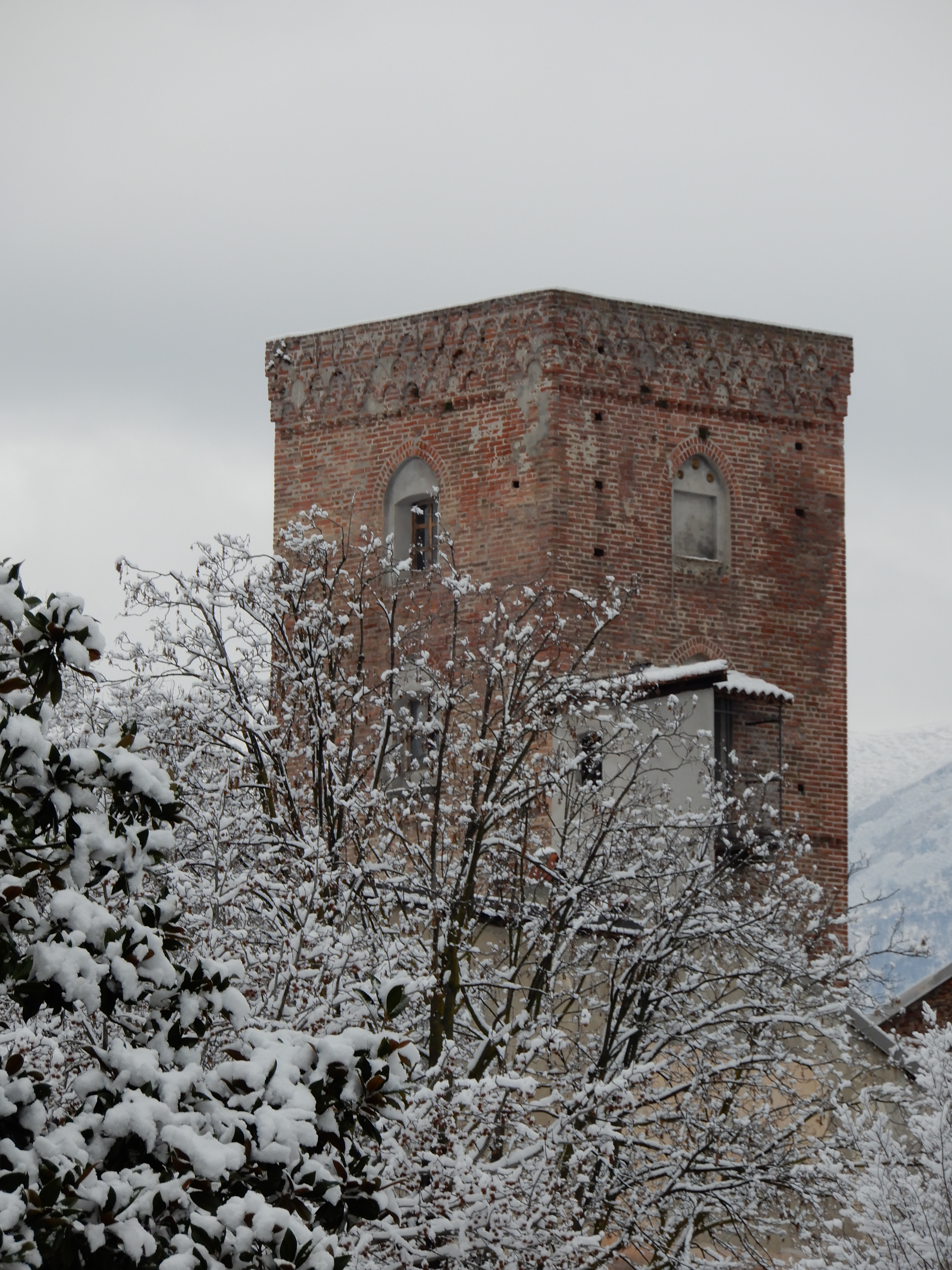
- The Tallianti Tower in 2020
- Click on the map for a fullscreen view

General information
- Location: Ivrea, Italy
- Coordinates: 45°27′58.7″N 7°52′45″E

The Tallianti Tower (Italian: Torre dei Tallianti) is a medieval tower located in Ivrea, Italy.

== History ==
The tower and its adjoining palazzo were erected between the 12th and 13th centuries by the ancient Tallianti family of Ivrea, which became extinct in 1740. The tower underwent restoration works in 2015.

== Description ==
The building is structured around an inner courtyard, on the eastern side of which rises the actual tower, in a square plan. The tower itself is two levels higher than the roof of the palazzo reaching a height of 24 meters, and features small pointed arch openings on its façades. Constructed of exposed stone and bricks, the tower is adorned in its upper section by a band consisting of three rows of hanging arches; the same decoration motif can be found on the palazzo's façade.
