= Palazzo Giusiana =

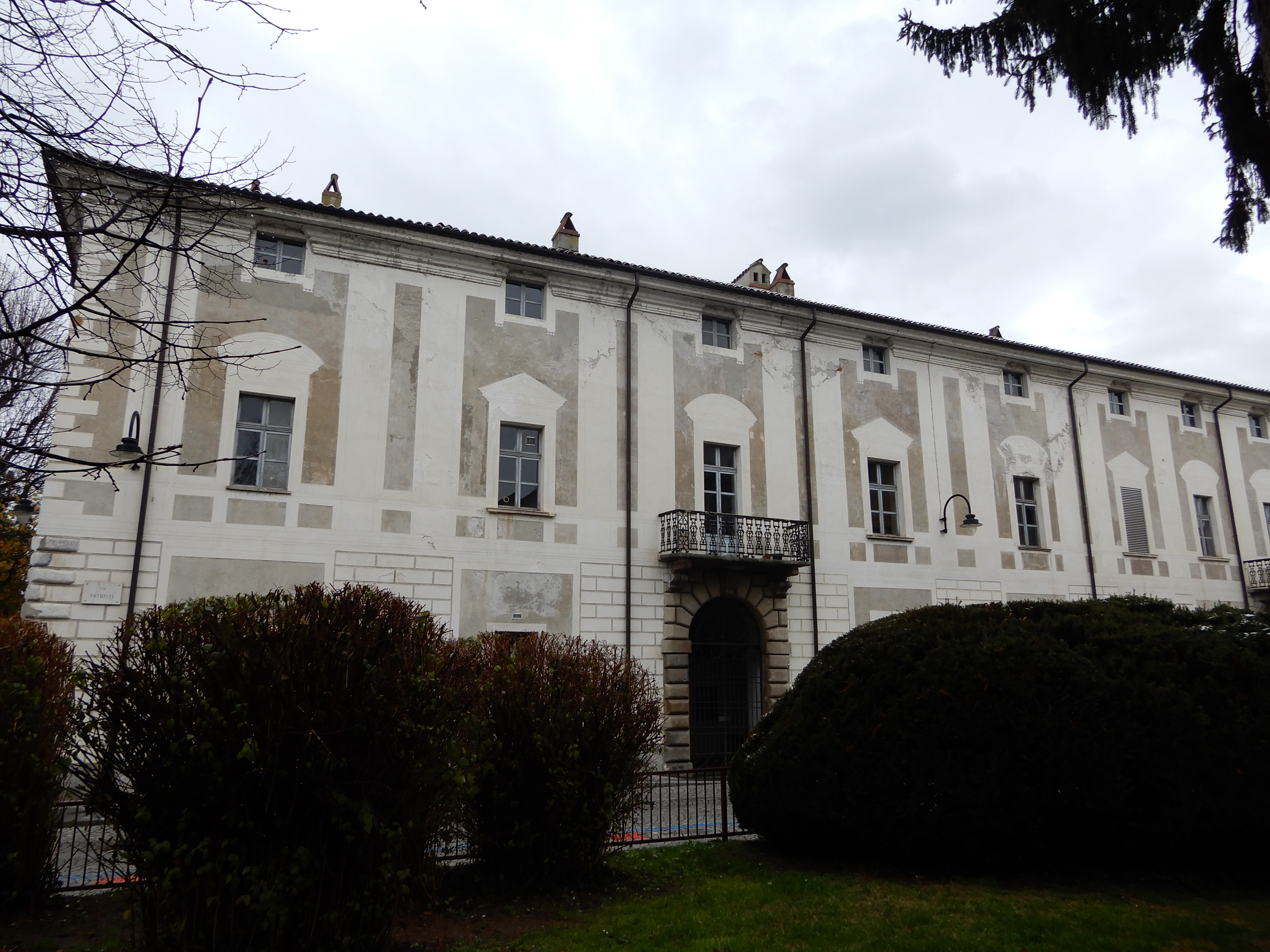
- Palazzo Giusiana in 2020
- Click on the map for a fullscreen view

General information
- Location: Ivrea, Italy
- Coordinates: 45°27′57.52″N 7°52′42.87″E

Palazzo Giusiana is a historic building located in Ivrea, Italy.

== History ==
There is uncertainty regarding the period of construction of the palace. However, it is assumed that it developed from a 15th-century tower house, which was significantly altered towards the end of the 16th century and the beginning of the 17th century, as evidenced by the late Renaissance forms that characterize much of the structure.

In 1635, Monsignor della Chiesa described the building as "the most beautiful and magnificent palazzo beyond the Dora Baltea in Piedmont, built by Baron Perrone." The palace also appears in the Theatrum Sabaudiae with the caption "P. del B. Perrone." Therefore, it can be asserted with some certainty that the Perrone di San Martino family was the first owner of the palace and the one who made it build.

The palace belonged to the Perrone family until 1799. After hosting Napoleon Bonaparte for a few days in 1800, the palace became the seat of the prefecture of the Doire Department during French domination. The property then briefly passed to the Garda family, and later to the Giusiana family, its current namesake.

From the late 19th century until the mid-2010s, the building almost continuously housed the Ivrea courthouse.

== Description ==
The palace is built around two internal courtyards, one of which has porticoes on two floors with columns supporting round arches and groin vaults.

== Gallery ==
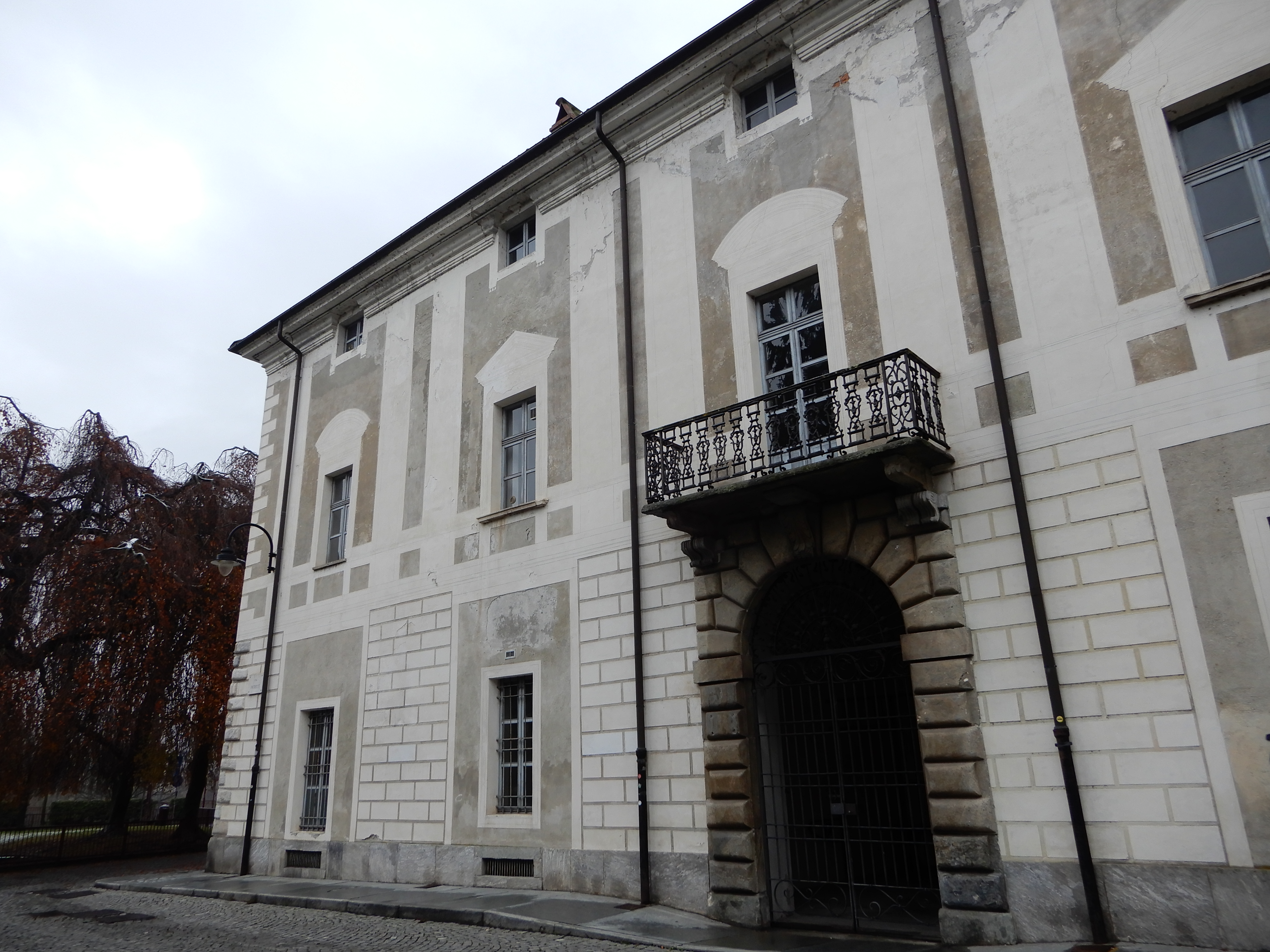

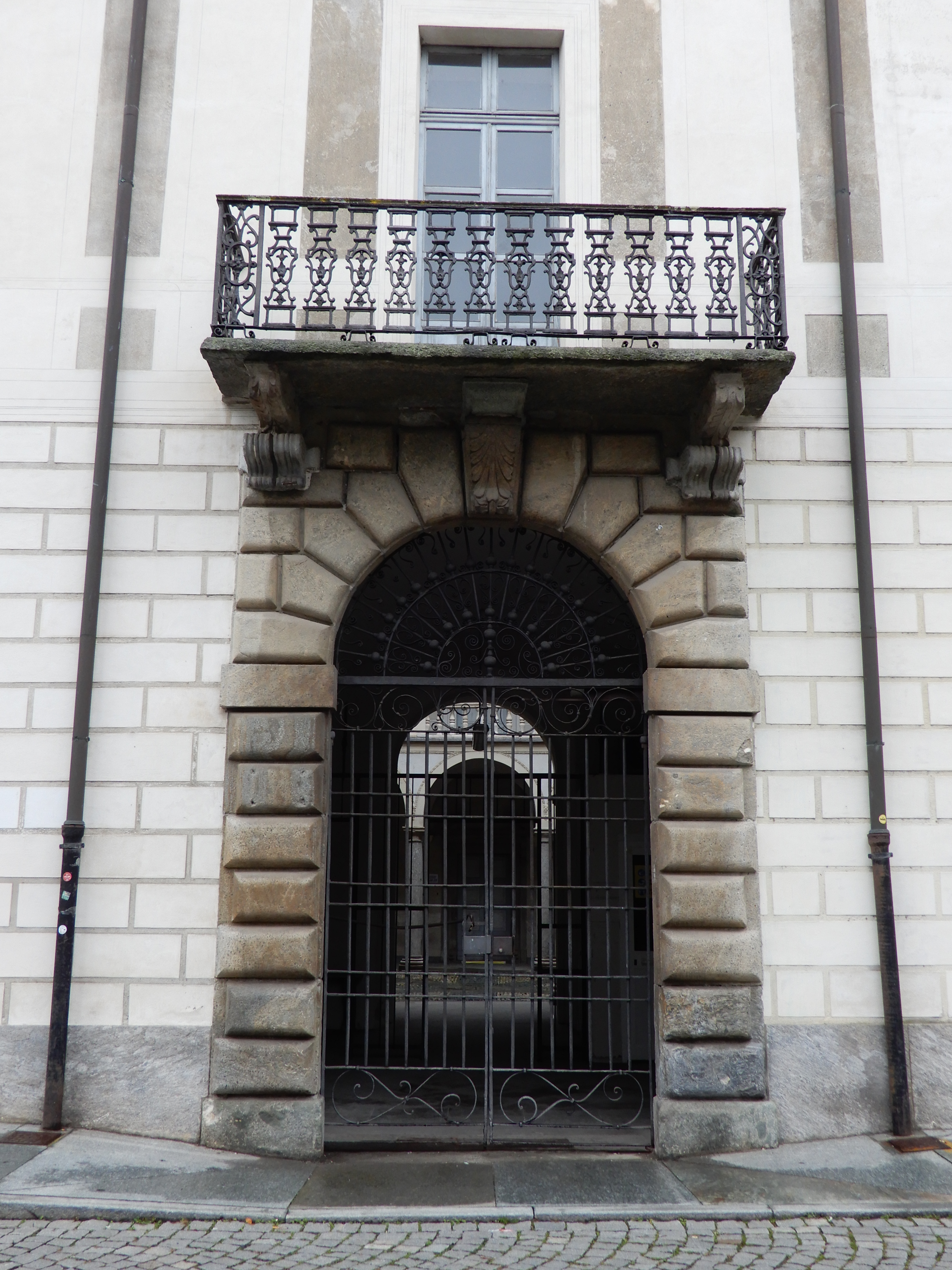

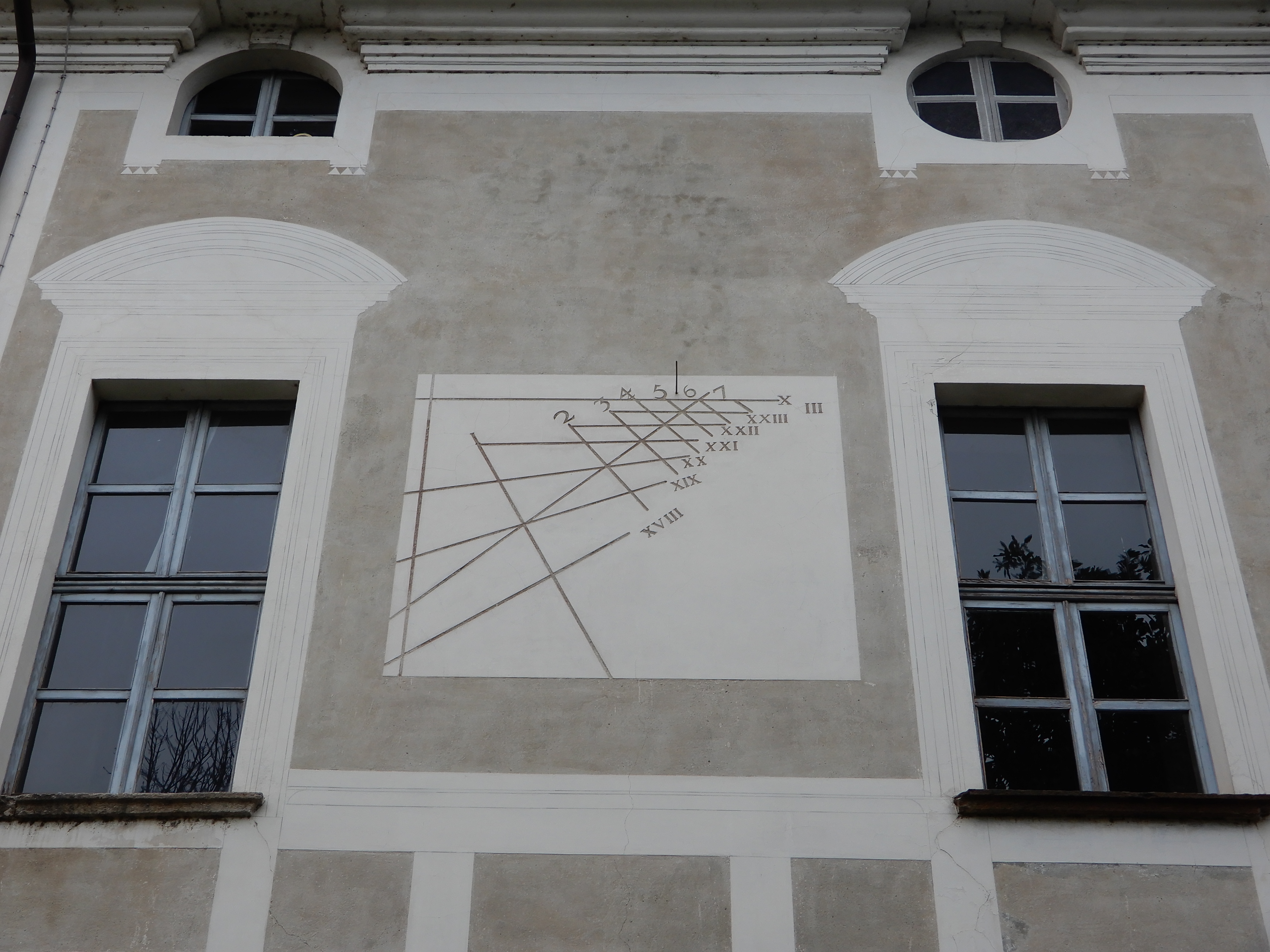
