= Defendente Ferrari =

Italian painter

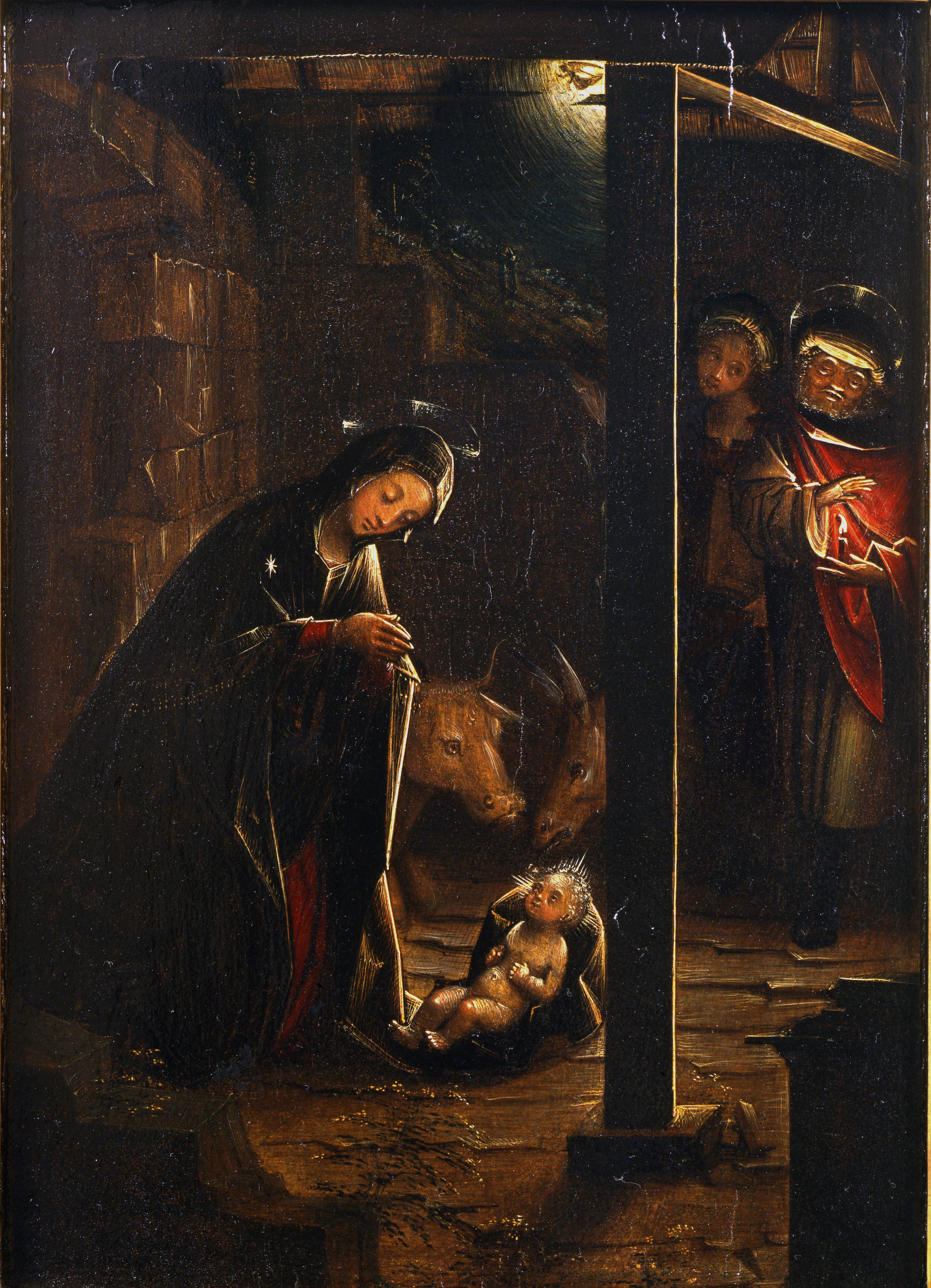
Nativity in Nocturnal Light

Defendente Ferrari (c. 1480/1485 – c. 1540) was an Italian painter active in Piedmont. His work marks the transition from late Gothic traditions to Renaissance art in the region.

== Life and work ==
Ferrari was born at Chivasso, near Turin. Here he trained and initially worked in the workshop of Giovanni Martino Spanzotti. Spanzotti had been the pre-eminent painter in western Piedmont after moving to Chivasso c. 1502. Many works previously thought to have been by Spanzotti are now attributed to Defendente.

Defendente achieved considerable success as a painter of polyptychs and altarpieces. He painted a number of nocturnal scenes such as the Nativity in Nocturnal Light (1510, Museo Civico d'Arte Antica, Turin).

He left a number of signed and dated works. His work developed away from its initial harsh style following Gothic traditions towards the use of more fluid brushstrokes and the creation of soft, dense highlights more in line with Renaissance painting. His style seems to indicate that he may have known the work of northern European artists such as Rogier van der Weyden, while his later work shows the influence of Macrino d'Alba.

== Selected works ==
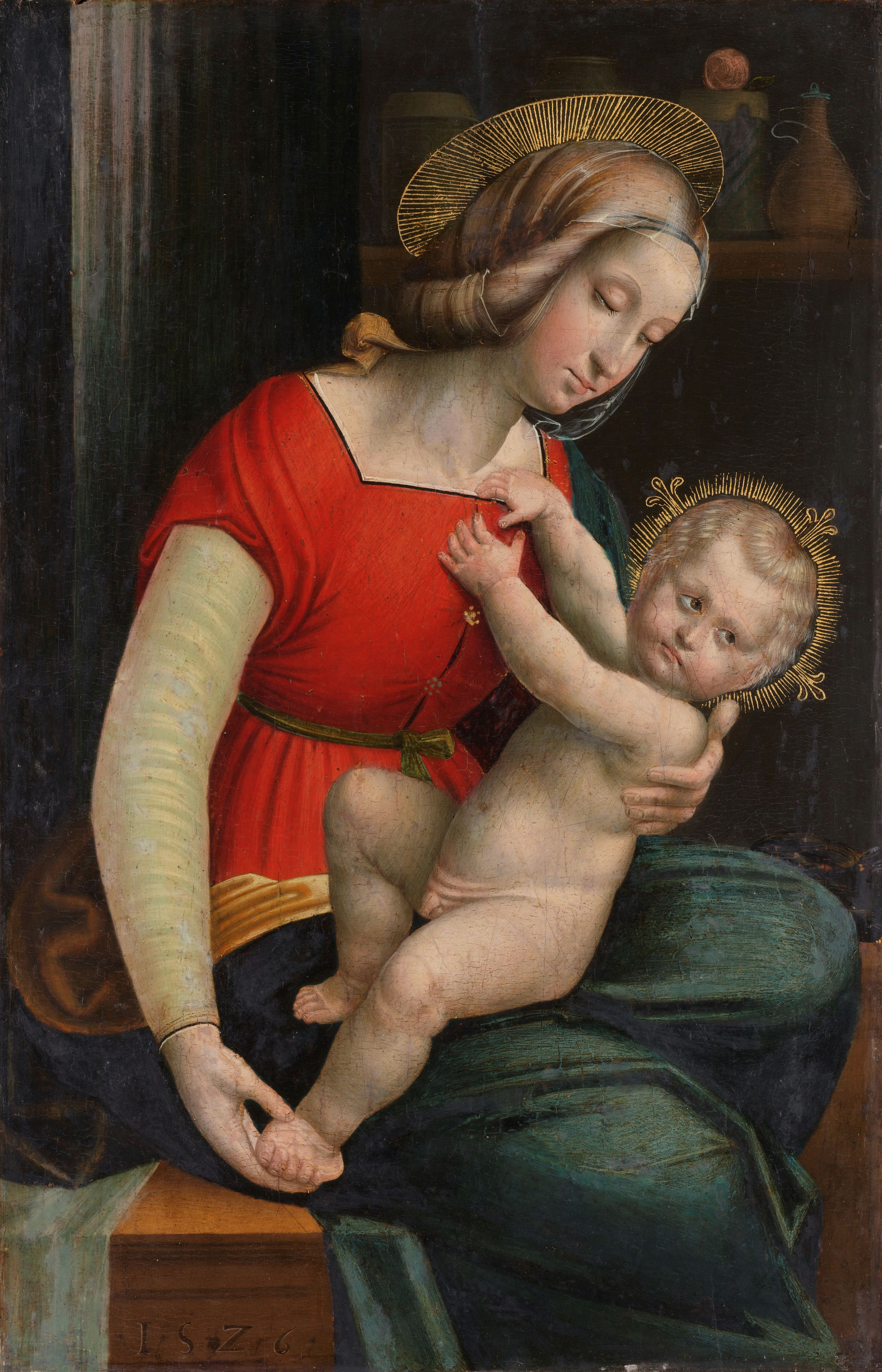
Virgin with Child

- Triptych (1507) in the Sacra di San Michele, Piedmont
- Nativity (1511), Church of St. John, Avigliana, Piedmont
- Polyptych of Sant'Ivo, Galleria Sabauda, Turin
- Bianzè Polypthych, Museo Borgogna, Vercelli, Piedmont
- St. Jerome in Penitence, Museo Civico d'Arte Antica, Turin
- The Mourning of Christ, Cathedral of Chivasso, Piedmont
- Madonna and Child, Galleria Palatina, Pitti Palace, Florence

== Sources ==
- Romano, Giovanni (1996). "Ferrari Defendente". Dizionario Biografico degli Italiani. rome. pp. 537–541.
- Fantino Fabrizio, Defendente Ferrari e la critica d'arte nell'Otto e Novecento, in «Annali di critica d’arte», III, 2007, pp. 175–217.
- Fantino Fabrizio, Altare ipsum est munitum icona satis pulcra: i dipinti cinquecenteschi di Gerolamo Giovenone e di Defendente Ferrari, in La chiesa di San Giovanni di Avigliana, a cura di Paolo Nesta, Borgone di Susa, 2011, pp. 149–177.
- Fantino Fabrizio, Il Battesimo di Cristo del duomo di Torino e un probabile disegno giovanile di Defendente Ferrari, in Mosaico. Temi e metodi d'arte e di critica per Gianni Carlo Sciolla, 2 vols., a cura di Rosanna Cioffi e Ornella Scognamiglio, Napoli, 2012, I, pp. 33–40.
