= Ivrea Town Hall =

Building in Ivrea, Piedmont, Italy

- Palazzo di Città di Ivrea (Italian)
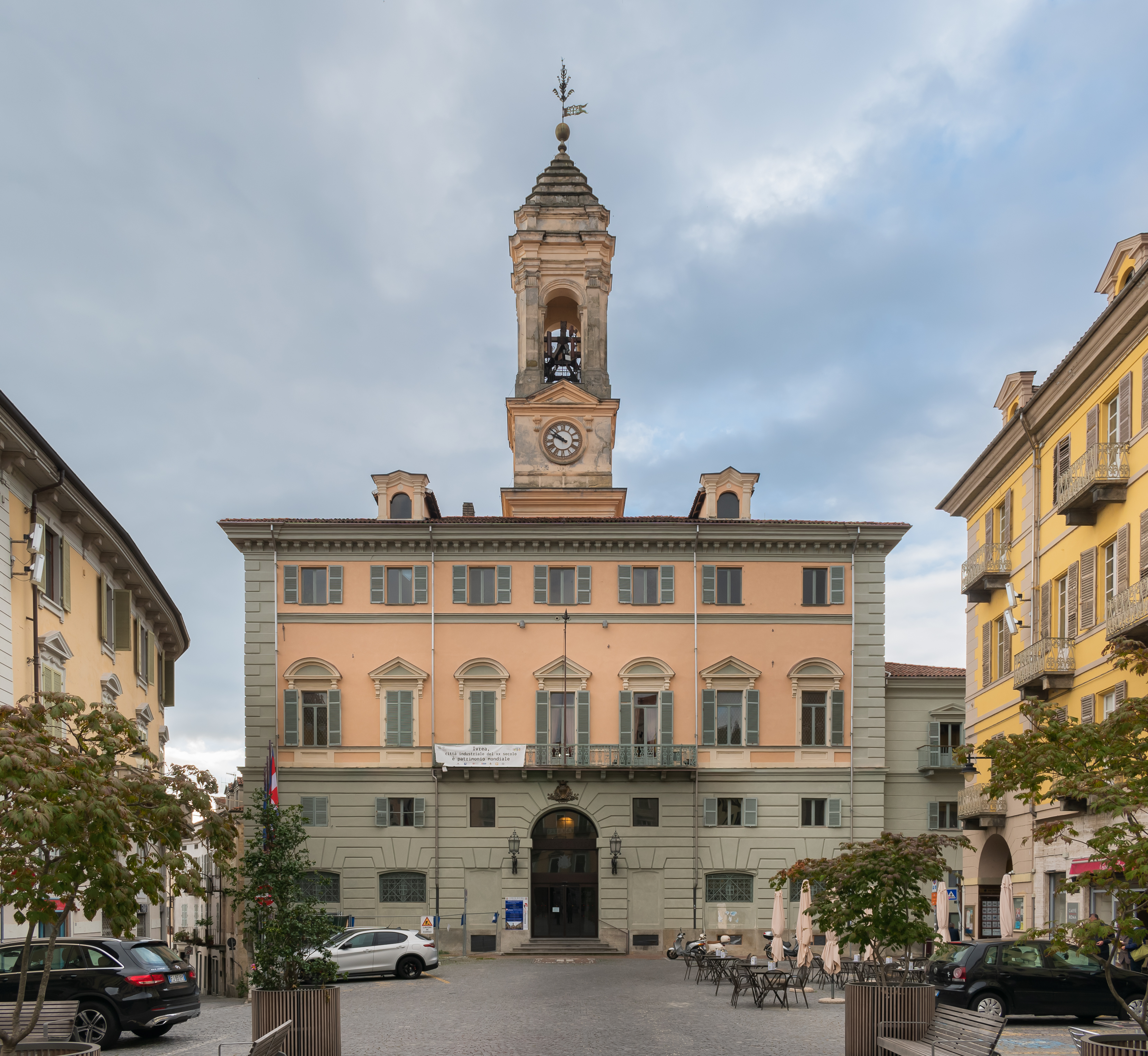
- Ivrea Town Hall in 2021
- Click on the map for a fullscreen view

General information
- Architectural style: Neoclassical
- Location: Ivrea, Italy
- Coordinates: 45°27′58.5″N 7°52′33.7″E

The Ivrea Town Hall (Italian: Palazzo di Città di Ivrea) is the town hall of the city and comune of Ivrea in Italy.

== History ==
The site where now stands the Palazzo di Città was previously occupied by the De Burgo Hospital, abandoned by 1750. The building of a new seat for the Comunal Council was then ordained on the 14 March 1741, having the previous one being judged as inadequate. The project of the building was presumably commissioned to engineer and architect Pietro Felice Bruschetti, even though some other sources suggest that engineer Giovanni Battista Borra was responsible for the planning of the building. Construction works started on 3 July 1758 and ended in 1761. The main façade and the grand hall were renovated between January and December 2013.

== Description ==
The Palazzo di Città is on the square formally known as "piazza Ferruccio Nazionale" but colloquially referred to as "piazza di Città". The building is a fundamental scenic backdrop for the Carnival of Ivrea.

== Gallery ==
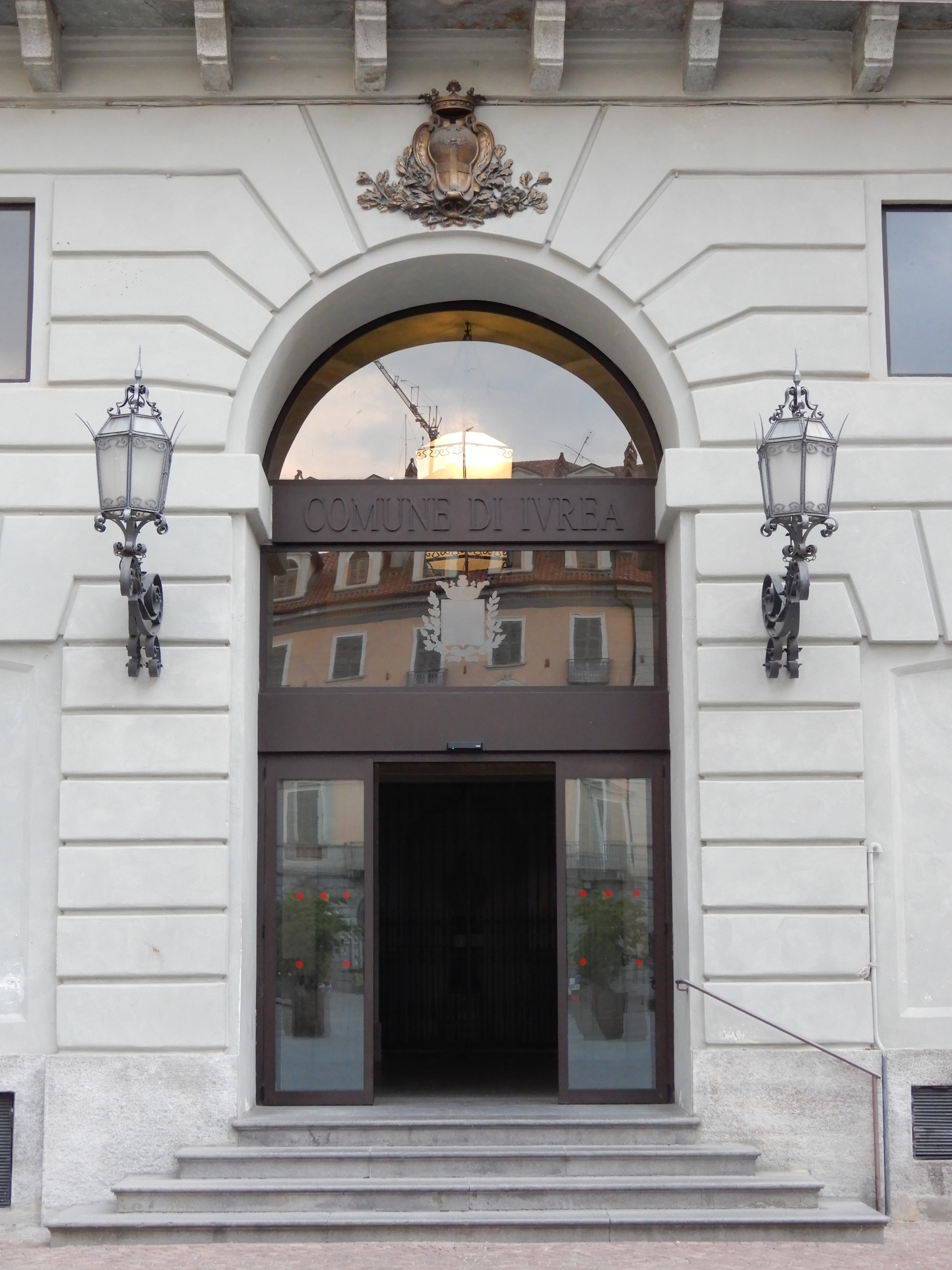

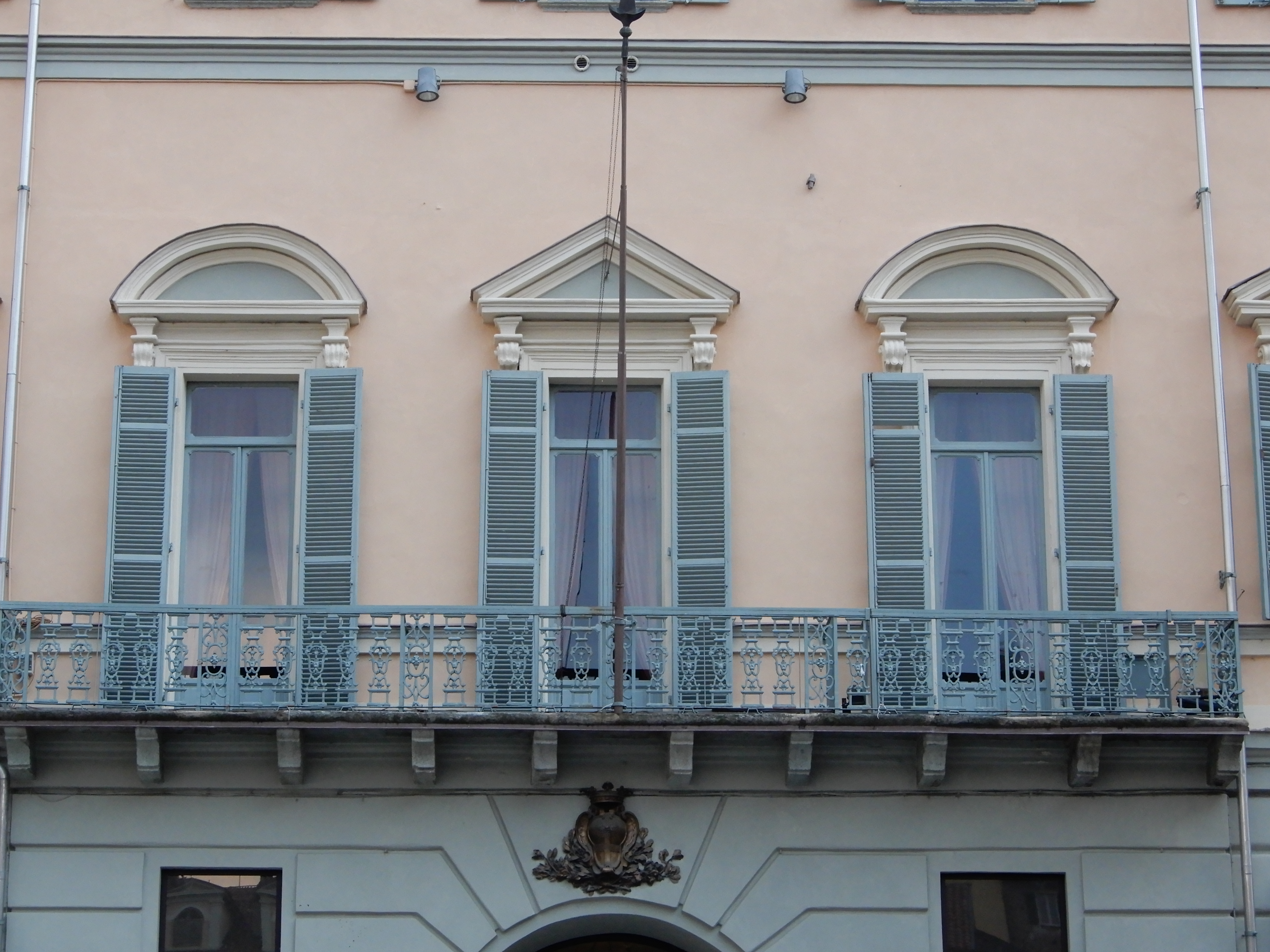

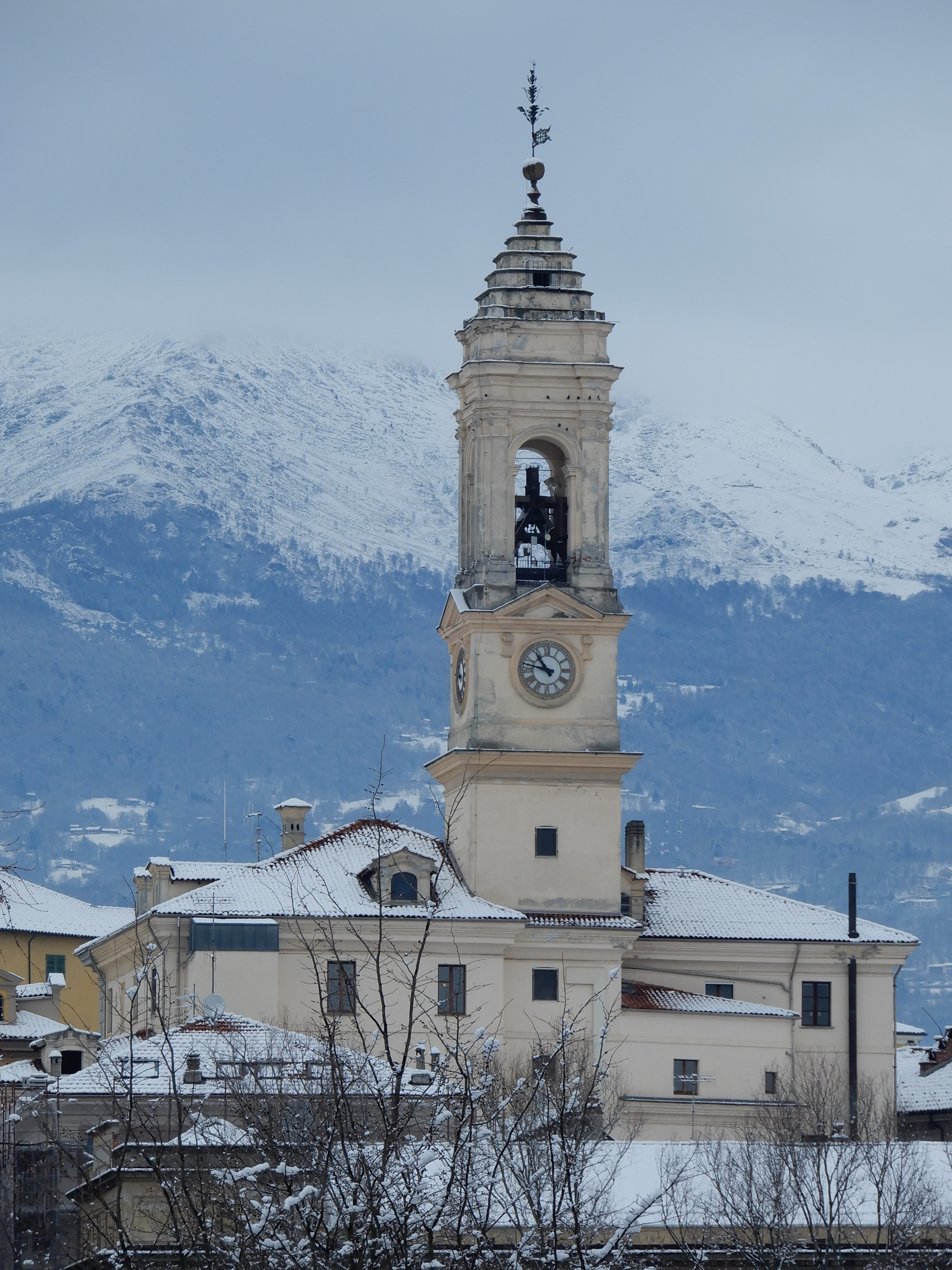
