= Giovanni Martino Spanzotti =

Italian painter

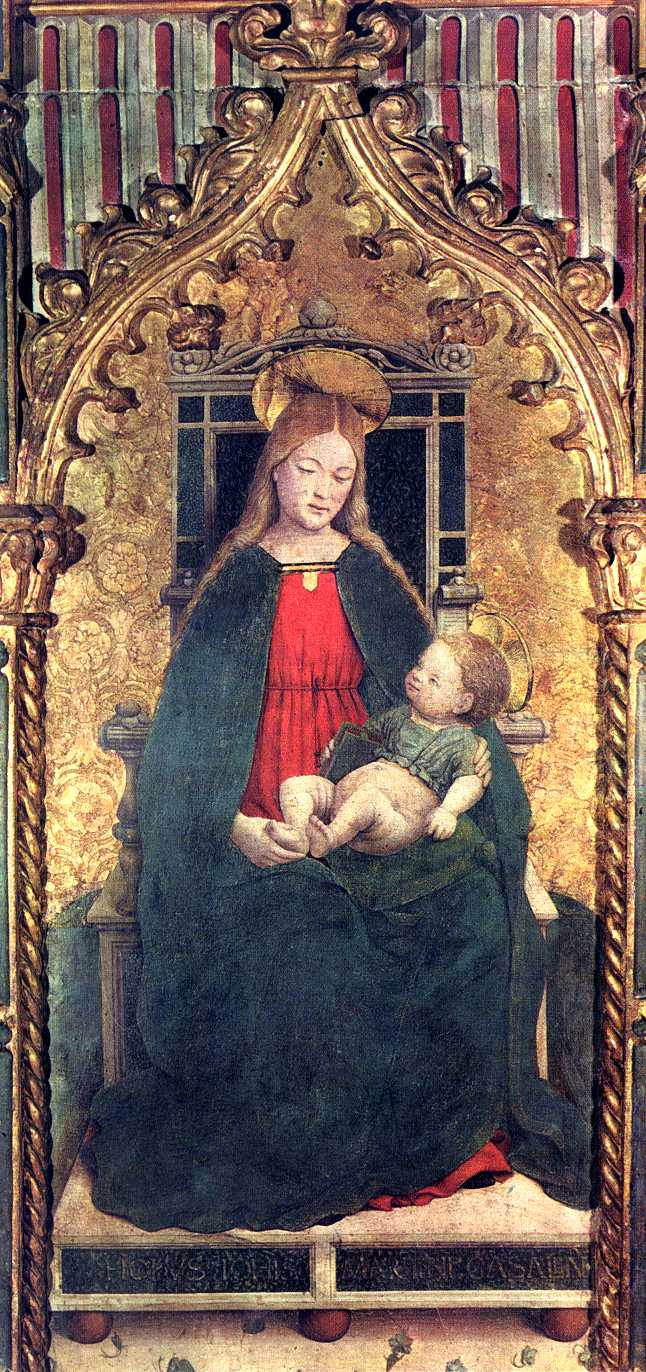
Virgin and Child Enthroned, tempera on panel, ca. 1480, detail of a polyptych, Galleria Sabauda, Turin

Giovanni Martino Spanzotti (c. 1455 – c. 1528; also known as Gian Martino Spanzotti) was an Italian painter active in Piedmont, Lombardy and northern Italy.

== Biography ==
He was born in Casale Monferrato and died in Chivasso. Little is known of his life. Born into a family of painters from Varese, he likely apprenticed with his father, Pietro. He appears to have had contacts with either Francesco del Cossa or his works, including the Madonna Enthroned (or Madonna Tucker) in the Turin City Museum of Ancient Art. Other influences are Zanetto Bugatto and Vincenzo Foppa. Spanzotti painted between 1480 and 1498 in the Piedmont, as well as in Casale Monferrato and Vercelli. Works from this period include the Triptych in the Galleria Sabauda (his sole signed work) and the Adoration with Child in Rivarolo Canavese. Around 1485-1490 he executed a cycle of frescoes of the Life of Christ in the church of San Bernardino in Ivrea.

His pupils included il Sodoma and Defendente Ferrari.

== Sources ==
- Ferrero, F. G.; E. Formica (2003). Arte medievale nel Canavese. Ivrea: Priuli & Verlucca Editori.
