= Gemüseschlacht =

Annual vegetable fight in Berlin

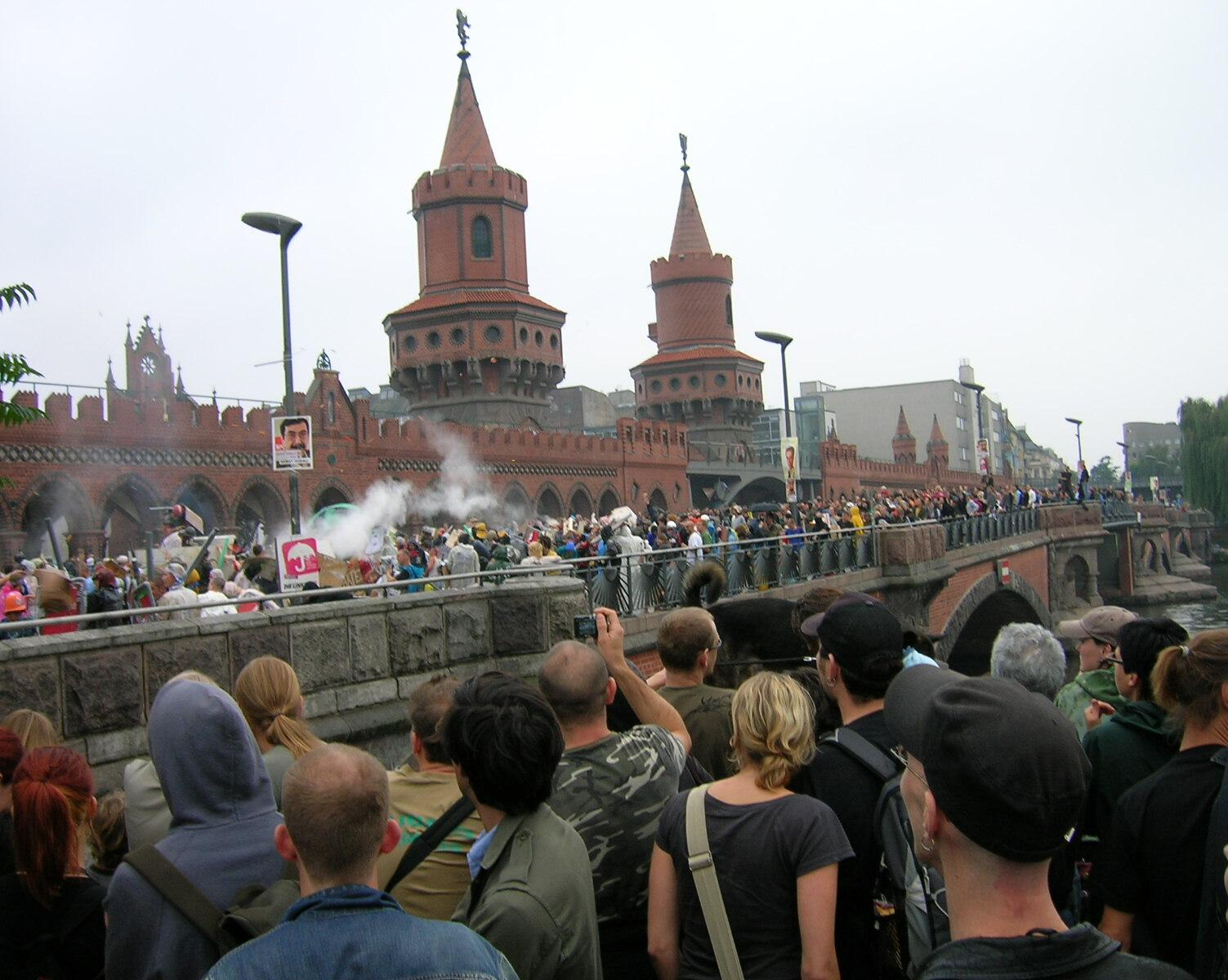
- The fight on the Oberbaum Bridge in 2005
- Observed by: Friedrichshain-Kreuzberg, Berlin, Germany
- Type: Local rivalry
- Celebrations: Food fight
- Frequency: Annual

The Gemüseschlacht (German for 'vegetable battle') or Wasserschlacht ('water battle') was an annual food fight held in Berlin, Germany on the Oberbaum Bridge between the districts of Friedrichshain and Kreuzberg. (Note: Die Tageszeitung noted that it was not held in 2006, 2007, and 2009, and Berliner Morgenpost reported that the 2011 edition was cancelled.) Traditionally held during the summer, the fight first occurred in 1998. (Note: The official website of the city of Berlin mentions that the fight's origins go as far back as 1920.) Hundreds of people attended the event; the German newspaper Die Welt reported in 2008 that there were 800 participants. The tradition had ended by 2022.

== Background ==
During the Cold War, the borough of Friedrichshain was a part of East Berlin, while the borough of Kreuzberg was across the Spree river in West Berlin. The Oberbaum Bridge over the Spree connected the two boroughs, and was one of the few checkpoints at which one could cross from West Berlin into East Berlin. (Note: The crossing was unidirectional, heavily guarded, and restricted to pedestrians.)

After East Germany merged with West Germany in 1990, the administration of the city of Berlin decided to combine the two boroughs of Friedrichshain and Kreuzberg into one borough, Friedrichshain-Kreuzberg. People of the two boroughs protested, as the decision had been made without seeking input from the residents. Many demonstrated by gathering at the Oberbaum Bridge and throwing food at each other.

The first such demonstration was held in 1998. The merger of the two boroughs was completed in 2001. Annual fights on the bridge continued and were officially registered as demonstrations.

== Fight ==
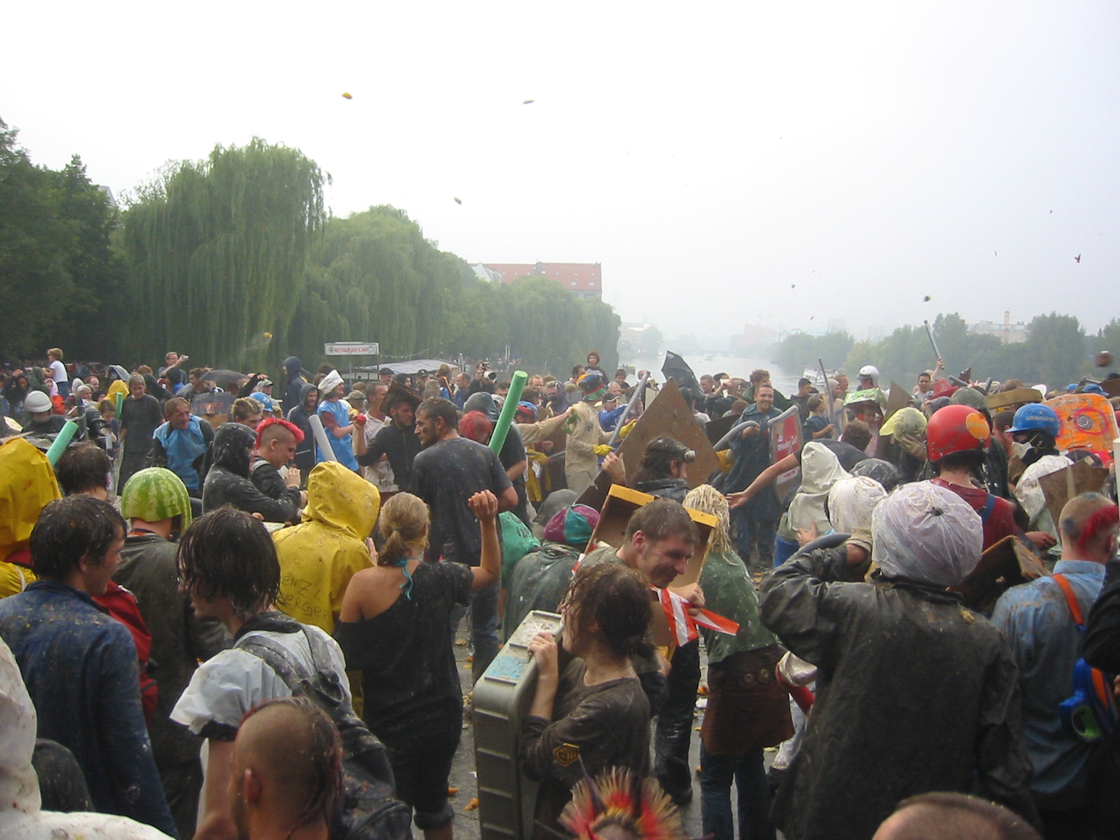
In the midst of the fighting, 2005

The annual fights, which always took place during the summer, had the residents of Friedrichshain pitted against the residents of Kreuzberg. The participants met on the Oberbaum Bridge connecting the two districts, with the goal of pushing the other side back onto land and claiming the bridge for themselves. The teams had names such as "Free Kreuzberg Homeland Security" and "Friedrichshain Water Army". The residents of Friedrichshain won most of the time.

Although "Gemüseschlacht" means 'vegetable battle' and "Wasserschlacht" means 'water battle', participants were not restricted to only using vegetables or water. Ammunition has also included eggs, flour, rotten fruit, and coffee grounds. The main requirement was that anything thrown should not be dangerous. Some participants also hit others with foam bats. There are reports that fresh raw herring and freshly used diapers had been used in 2008.

== Police ==
In 2003, the police restricted access to the bridge to attempt to prevent the fight from happening, and ended up being targeted by the participants instead. One 15-year-old student from the Berlin district of Hellersdorf ended up being brought to court because the police officer he hit did not find it amusing. Although the raw egg he threw only hit the officer's leg and caused no pain, the secondary school student found himself in the justice system for the first time over the incident. The judge did not consider the student a rioter and gave him a work sentence.

A police spokesperson described the event in 2008 as a "totally peaceful gathering". (Note: The specific phrase used was "völlig friedliche Veranstaltung".) Similarly, the police reported in 2013 that the event remained peaceful.

== Fight in Hanover ==
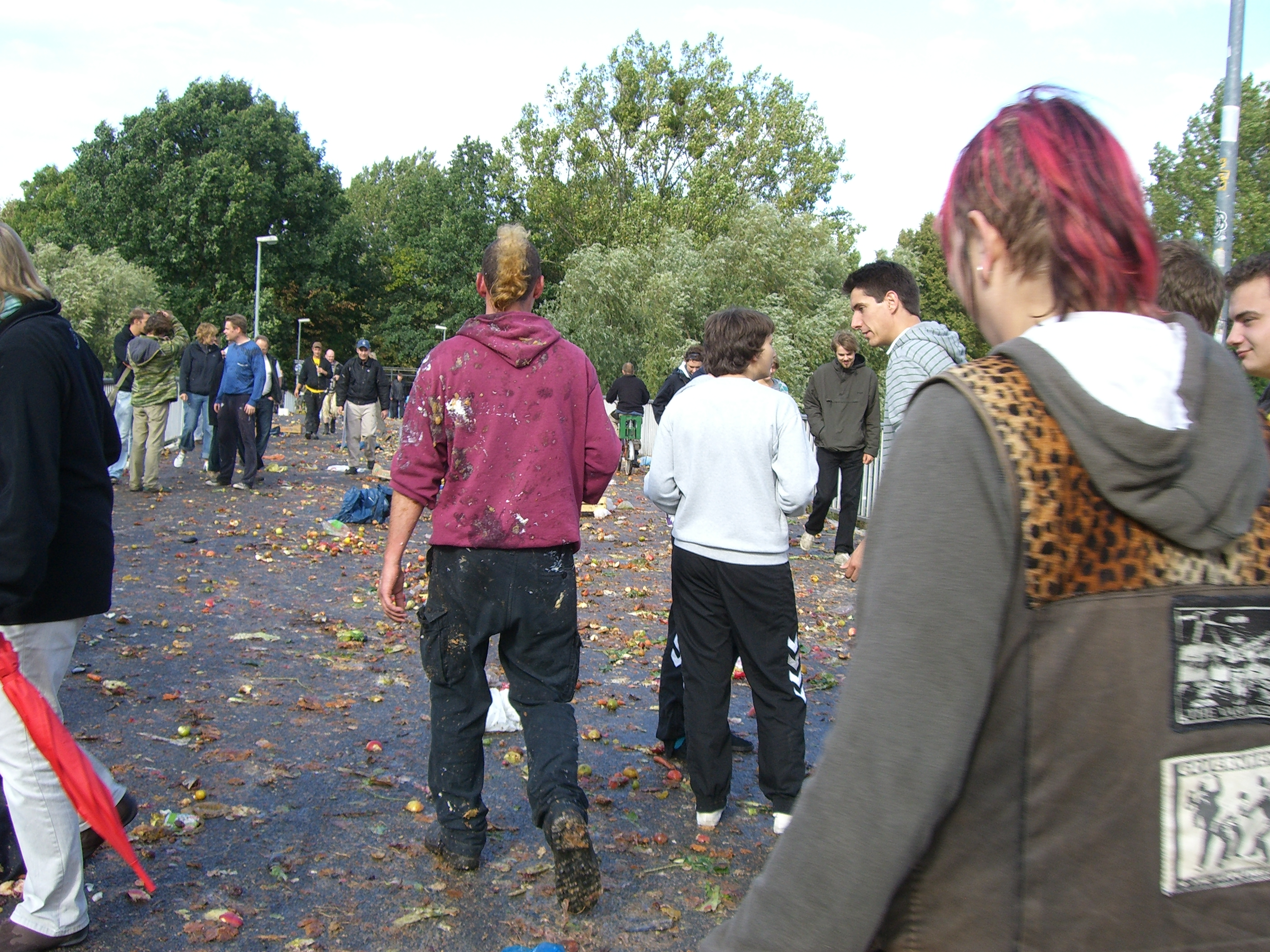
The aftermath in Hanover, 2009

A similar event took place in Hanover, Germany every September from 2003 until shortly before 2020. Also called Gemüseschlacht, the fight took place over the Sleeping Beauty Bridge, and was contested between the boroughs of Linden-Limmer and Nord, which are located on opposite sides of the bridge.

== See also ==
- Carnival of Ivrea, an orange fight in Italy
- Gorehabba, a cow dung fight following Diwali in India
- Haro Wine Festival, a wine fight in Spain
- La Tomatina, a tomato fight in Spain
- Pidakala War, a cow dung fight following Ugadi in India
- Songkran, during which water fights are held in Thailand
