= Gorehabba =

Hindu festival celebrated in Karnataka, India

Coordinates: 11.778716°N 77.025208°E

Gorehabba (lit. 'cow dung festival' in Kannada) is a local Hindu festival celebrated in the village of Gumatapura, located on the Karnataka and Tamil Nadu border. It is celebrated annually a day after Diwali's Bali Padyami and is dedicated to Beerappa, a god worshipped by the Kurubas community. The festival involves participants playfully throwing or smearing cow dung on one another as part of a local ritual tradition. The village of Gumatapura, also spelled Gumatapur, was formerly part of Chamarajanagar district in Karnataka and was transferred to Tamil Nadu following the States Reorganisation Act.

== Background ==
As per local legends, god Beerappa, who is worshipped by the Kuruba community, was born from cow dung; therefore, the festival is celebrated by splashing cow dung on one another. It is also believed that participating in the cow dung splashing game cures people of all kinds of diseases, which is one of the reasons for keeping the tradition alive, even after hundreds of years.

== Festival ==
The festival is around 300 years old. The ceremony begins early in the morning, when men, women and children start collecting cow dung from all over the village and dump it behind the local Beerappa Temple. Later, girls and boys go around the village collecting oil and butter to offer puja at the temple. They then collect more oil and butter and offer puja at the Karappa Temple, located one kilometre from the Beerappa temple. Once the puja is done, the villagers return in procession. On the way back, one person is designated as the chadikora (sneak). Then a moustache and beard made of herbs are fixed on him, he sits on a donkey and is taken to the temple in procession.

After reaching the temple, the chadikora's moustache and beard are removed and buried in the pit where the dung heap has been deposited. Then, a puja is offered on the cow dung heap and the celebration begins. The first act after the puja is to sprinkle dung on the priest, which is considered the signal to start throwing cow dung at each other. Each person in the village is pushed into the pit and smeared with cow dung. At the same time, thousands of people from the surrounding villages gather to watch the ceremony.

Later, an effigy of the chadikora is made and taken to a nearby hill called Kondigekara Gudda to be burned, along with a chicken. The villagers cleanse themselves in the lake, return to the village and worship the chadikora.

Similar to Gorehabba, people in the village of Kairuppala near Aspari in the Kurnool district of Andhra Pradesh celebrate Pidakala War.

== See also ==
- Pidakala War – a cow dung fight following Ugadi in Andhra Pradesh, India
- Carnival of Ivrea – an orange fight in Italy
- La Tomatina – a tomato fight in Spain
- Songkran – during which water fights are held in Thailand
