= Pidakala War =

Annual cow dung fight in Andhra Pradesh, India

The Pidakala War is a local Hindu folklore-based annual cow dung fight held in the village of Kairuppala, near Aspari in Kurnool district, Andhra Pradesh, India.

According to the village folklore, before a marriage between the goddess Bhadrakali and god Virabhadra, there was a dispute. At one point, villagers supporting Bhadrakali began throwing cow dung at Virabhadra, and villagers supporting Virabhadra responded with cow dung as well. The fight lasted for about an hour before the leaders of the village settled the situation and the marriage between the two gods was held.

Similarly, the village is split into two sides representing various Hindu and Muslim communities. This celebration is assumed to have started in this village based on local traditions and is locally regarded as good for health.

== Etymology ==
The Telugu term "pidakalu" refers to dried cow dung cakes used for fuel, and "samaram" means combat, war, or battle.

== Festival ==
Villagers of Kairuppala traditionally observe the cow dung fight and the marriage between the two gods by holding an annual cow dung fight on the day after Ugadi. The village is split into two sides: the Dalit, Kuruba and Yadava communities on one side representing Bhadrakali; and the Lingayat, Muslim and Reddy communities on the other representing Virabhadra.

Hundreds of people take part in the fight. There is a large police presence at the festival in order to avoid seriously unruly incidents. Injuries do occur, but no complaints are filed. After the end of the fight, the village celebrates the marriage of Virabhadra and Bhadrakali, together. Celebrations at Kallur in Kurnool city have their own significance. Annually, donkeys from over the city are forced to walk three times around the Chowdeswari Temple in a 3-foot-deep (0.91 m) puddle of mud made for that purpose, then they are washed, decorated and worshiped. Devotees gather in large numbers at the temple to witness this ritual, which is believed to bring peace to the city.

== Legend ==
According to local Hindu folklore, before a marriage between the goddess Bhadrakali (Note: Bhadrakali is sometimes referred to as "Kalika Devi".) and the god Virabhadra, (Note: Virabhadra is sometimes referred to as "Veerabhadra Swamy".) there was a dispute. Sources appear to vary regarding the basis of the dispute: The Hans India states that Bhadrakali was angered by Virabhadra's unexpected advances and threatened to throw cow dung at him, while The New Indian Express states that the couple was separated for some time following an affair. At one point, villagers supporting Bhadrakali began throwing cow dung at Virabhadra, and villagers supporting Virabhadra responded with cow dung as well. The fight lasted for about an hour before the leaders of the village settled the situation and the marriage between the two gods was held.

== Recent years ==
In 2012, about 15 people were injured, but no complaints were filed. In 2022, a local official reported that up to 50 people sustained injuries, but the police received no complaints. In 2021, during the COVID-19 pandemic in India, despite India suffering outbreaks and experiencing a recent surge in cases at the time, special permission to hold the festival was granted. That year, a video of a crowd of maskless festivalgoers throwing cow dung during a pandemic sparked outrage online. A police official stated that about 100 people were injured, but no one complained.

== See also ==
- Cattle in religion and mythology § Hinduism
- Gorehabba – a cow dung fight celebrated following Diwali in Gumatapura village, on the border of Karnataka and Tamil Nadu
- Carnival of Ivrea – an orange fight in Italy
- La Tomatina – a tomato fight in Spain
