= Oggu Katha =

Folk dance from Telangana

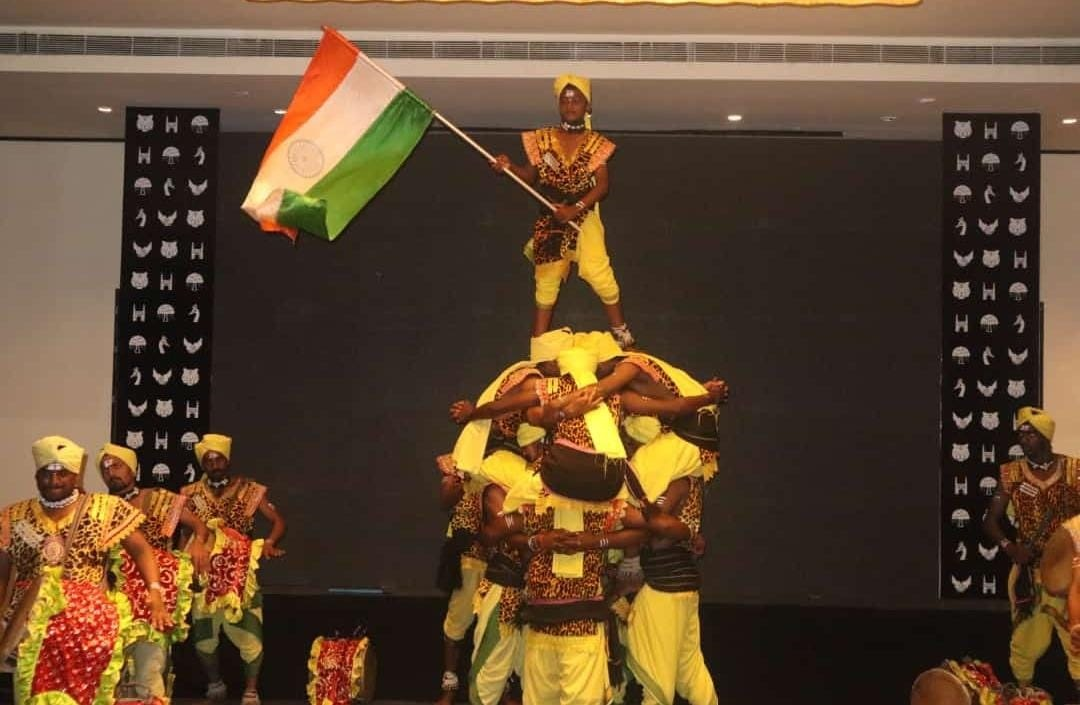
Oggu Dolu performance in 2023 at Hyderabad

Oggu Katha or Oggukatha is a traditional folklore singing, praising and narrating the stories of Hindu gods Mallana, Beerappa and Yellamma. It originated among the Golla (yadav) and Kuruma (Kuruba)communities, who devoted themselves to the singing of ballads in praise of Lord Shiva (also called Mallikarjuna). These tradition-loving and ritual-performing community moves from place to place, narrating the stories of their caste gods. Oggus are the traditional priests of the Golla Kurumas and perform the marriage of Mallanna with Bhramaramba.

== Etymology ==
The story narrated about Lord Mallanna or Mallikarjuna Swamy using the instrument "Jaggu"(damarukam) is known as Oggu Katha. Used at the beginning of each story and also at the marriage festival of Lord Mallanna.

Founder of Oggu kathalu was Sri. Vallam Pedda Veeraiah which was continued by his son Vishwa Vikyatha Oggu Katha Sarva Bhoumulu Vallam Sathaiah. The stories, scripts, dialogues and lyrics on Kommaravelli Mallana, Yellama Devi, Nalla Pochamma Devi were all developed by Vallam Sathaiah.

This tradition was carried forward by the successors of Vallam Sataiah Sons Vallam Veeresham Yadav and Vallam Mahesh . They made Oggu Kathalu famous through many Stage shows, TV and Radio programs. Vallam Sataiah taught many students the complete concepts of Oggu Katha. It is because of this knowledge sharing, Oggu Katha has been spread to various parts of the country.

Vallam Veeresham Yadav is the founder of AP "Oggu Pujarula Sangham" which is based in Hyderabad providing a respectable living to many families. Inspired by his elder brother, Vallam Mahesh Yadav laid foundation to the Telangana Oggu Pujarula Sangham and is very famous for his Dolu vaidyam.

The popular names in Oggu katha artists are Chukka Sattaiah made oggu katha famous worldwide.

Chukka Sattaiah famous for Beerappa oggu katha, mallanna oggu katha, sri mandatha oggu katha with his melodious voice which attracts the Telangana people.

Midde Ramulu is in TV shows and his oggu katha kalakarulu.

Many more oggu katha artists like Tarala Jangaiah, Avula Muthyalu, Erra Mallesh, Sanake Ballappa, Srisailam yadav, Mallesh yadav, Tarala Babu, Nagesh yadav, Sidappa, Krishna, Kunta Beeraiah kuruma, Kunta Chera kuruma, gajarla buggaiah, bolli raju, Gajarla Dhevaraju, etc..took the oggu kathalu to heights...

Telangana government is focusing on Propagating the culture of Oggu Katha.

== The group ==
The Oggu performers narrate the stories of Mallanna and Beerappa and Shakti ballads, of Yellamma. These ballads are in 'manjari dwipada', containing lyrical prose, recited with great oratorical and rhetorical nuances.

The team consists of four to six members. The main narrator, an assisting narrator, and at least two instrumentalists - one playing on a big drum called 'rana bheri' and the other on brass talas of a big size. Another member plays on a kanjira and the sixth one sings along with the narrator and also plays a napheera, a wind instrument, used at times of martial valor.

== The performance ==
Oggu katha artists perform Kalyanam (marriage) of Lord Mallikarjuna Swamy with his wife's Lord Golla Kethamma and Medalamma.

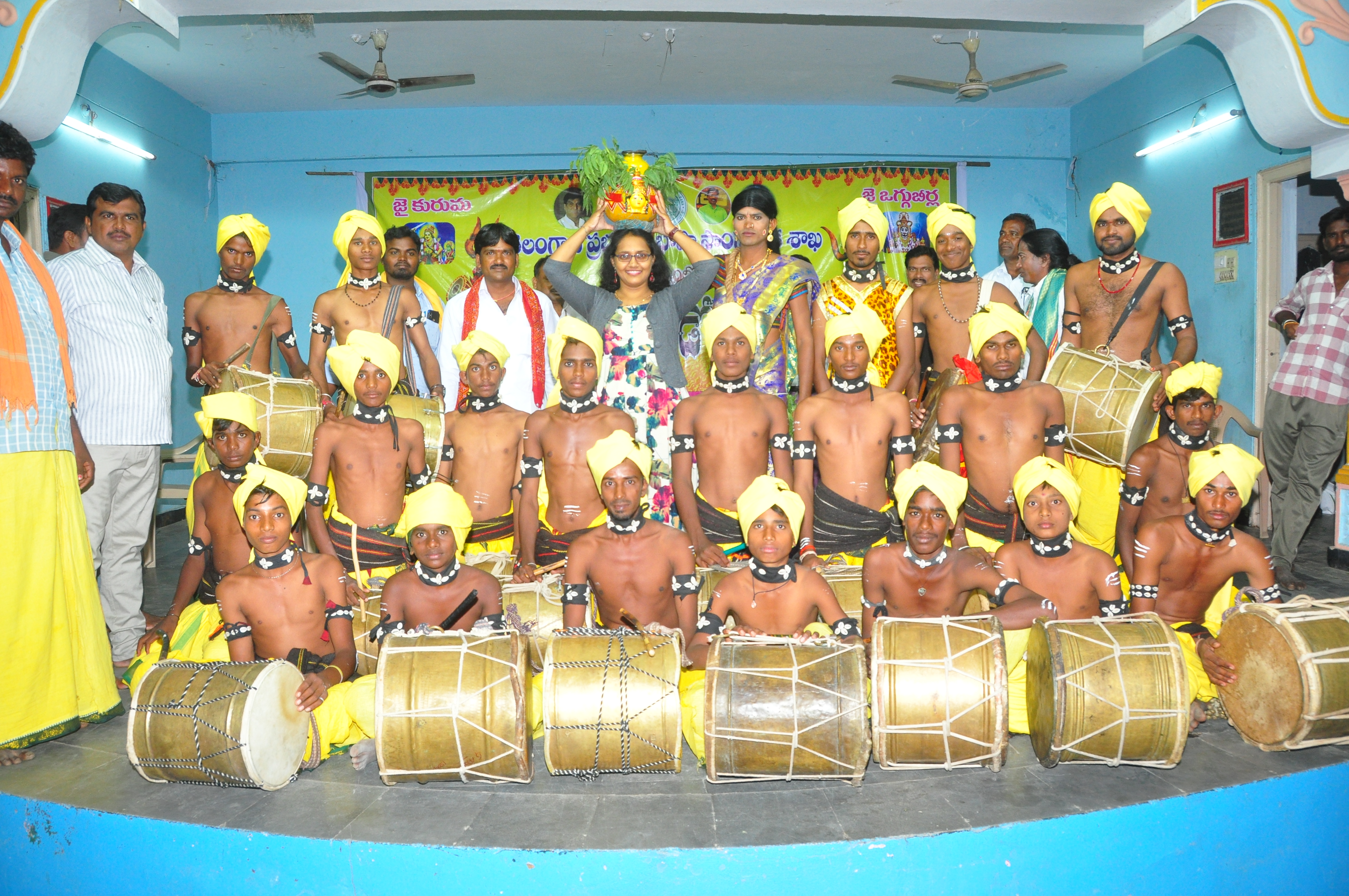
Oggudolu Team in Oggukatha-Oggudolu Festival in Bellampally (25.10.2018)

The narrate the stories of Lord Mallana and his sister Lord Yellama Devi. Instruments used like Jaggu (damarukam), Dolu and Thalam.

The narrator and his chorus i.e. two narrators-help in dramatizing the narration as very often, they transform themselves into two characters. The dramatization of the narrative is what gives the Oggu Katha its predominant place especially in Telangana, where Oggu Katha prevalent. The singers (oggu katha artists) and devotees visit the pilgrimage place Komaravelli Mallanna Temple every year which is located on a hill called Indrakeeladri in Komuravelli village, located in Warangal District, of Telangana state, India.

A large number of devotees visit the Mallanna temple during Maha Shivaratri when the Pedda Patnam is celebrated and also during the Agni Gundaalu which is celebrated on the Sunday falling before the Ugadi. All devotees can be seen with turmeric on their foreheads. The festive season, called as Jatara begins from Sankranti and lasts till Ugadi. Large number of devotees offer prayers to the deity on all Sundays which fall in between Sankranti to Ugadi.

== Dress ==
The chief narrator wears a big pant tied up to the knees, a colored shirt, a colored head cloth, a colored waistcloth, and ankle bells. The other narrator also will have the same dress. More than the costume, the ornaments they have to wear are traditionally considered more important. The main narrator will have a chain made of seven shells called 'gavvala darshanam'.

There is a legend regarding this chain of shells. It was said that seven brothers of Bhramaramba (Mallanna's consort) fought with him at the time of her wedding. Mallanna defeated them and cursed them to be dogs. When Bhramaramba entreated the Lord to save them from the curse, he graced them by asking them to be Oggus and narrate his stories. The seven shells symbolize the seven brothers and are given a prominent place while narrating the story.

In addition, they wear five silver rings and five silver chains (jogirly), a wrist band (ponchi), thick silver rings (kadiyam) around the neck, to the right wrist and to the upper arm, a three - layered garland made of pagadam (sapphire) and round silver nooses (tavalam), ande and matte to the fingers of the foot and a garland with Mallana's portrait on it (ambarala golusu). During the course of action, he also wears a stick, which serves also as a sword or the chains of a horse.

== Notable performers ==
- Chukka Sattaiah - He is famous for his melodious voice which attracts the Telangana people.
- Kathala Mallaiah (Poodur Mallaiah) - He is famous for many own Folk Oggu katha styles & 50 years of experience in the Oggu Katha field.
- Midde Ramulu - He is very famous in TV shows.
- Bala siddulu- His voice and way of expression of oggu katha is widely cherished by people of Telangana.

== See also ==
- Kirtan
- Harikatha
- Burra katha
- Pravachan
