= The Crown Snatchers =

Book by F. K. Waechter and Bernd Eilert

- Cover of first edition (softcover)
- Author: F. K. Waechter and Bernd Eilert
- Original title: Die Kronenklauer
- Translator: Edite Kroll
- Illustrator: F. K. Waechter
- Language: English
- Genre: Children's literature
- Publisher: Pantheon Books
- Publication date: 1972
- Publication place: Germany
- English publication date: 1974
- Media type: Print (Paperback)
- Pages: 162
- OCLC: 1053983
- LC Class: PZ8.W133 Cr3

The Crown Snatchers is a self-described "superstorybook" written by German authors F. K. Waechter and Bernd Eilert. It is the English translation of Die Kronenklauer, which was first published in 1972, by Rowohlt Verlag in Germany. Two years later, Pantheon Books and Random House of Canada, Ltd. published the English translation in the United States and Canada, respectively.

The book follows the adventures of three young children – Robert, Joanna, and Moritz – who run afoul of the local tyrant, King Fatback. He imprisons them and subjects them to a strict regimen of brainwashing. However, the children soon learn that all is not as it seems in the castle. They and a like-minded friend devise a plan to bring just rule to the land.

== Plot synopsis ==
The story begins by introducing itself as a made-up story. It introduces the three children as the principal characters and considers a number of settings before deciding on a meadow. It turns out that the meadow lies within a small kingdom inhabited by the three children and a variety of anthropomorphic animals. We find Robert, Joanna, and Moritz hard at work trying to reach hazelnuts in three tall trees. They make the acquaintance of a dignified owl, Dr. Loy, who is suddenly scared off by the sound of an approaching motor. The children watch bemused as King Fatback's royal limousine approaches. The King himself, a pig, accuses them of stealing his nuts. They are taken to the castle and introduced to the caretaker, a matronly cat named Miss Bellmouse, who places them in separate rooms. Life at the castle is a regimented series of rings, gongs, bells, and buzzers that announce one dismal activity after another: sleep; lessons taught by the unpleasant teacher-dog, Mr. Prouch; brainwashing lectures given by the king's overbearing cousin Clemens; flavorless meals; and a weekly trip to the playroom.

The children rebel at every possible turn despite being held against their will. They talk back to Mr. Prouch and, when he loses his spectacles in a rage, make their first escape attempt. However, it fails when they find themselves caught climbing over the castle's surrounding wall. They also start a food fight at dinner one night.

One day, while alone in the playroom, Robert discovers a hole in the wall behind a large wardrobe. The hole leads to a dusty store room that contains what they first think is a gray hose but which turns out to be the trunk of Holger, the elephant, who is locked in the next room and is sticking his trunk through a hole in the door. Holger tells the children about Crown Day, an impending holiday in which he will be forced cart the king around in the Royal Litter (a box-like seat which straps to Holger's back) so that all the animals may see and honor the king. The children suggest the idea of stealing the king's crown, though no one ventures a specific plan.

The next week, the children meet Holger in the storeroom and tell stories about whimsical dreams they have had. Holger presents them with a daring plan, to which the children agree. The three fake an escape, pretending to have broken out of the play room window, but in fact they return to the storeroom and hide inside the Royal Litter. The castle is in an uproar searching for them, but the children pass the time with Holger telling stories, and eventually fall asleep.

That night Robert dreams that the snatched crown falls onto the head of Dr. Loy.

The next day is August 21, Crown Day, and the children wake to find themselves inside the litter being strapped to Holger's back. They are not discovered, and the Crown Day parade commences. The party reaches a bridge and springs the plan into action: Holger uses his trunk to blow a smoke screen, grabs the crown, and passes it to the concealed children. He pretends that the crown rolled off the bridge. The king's party desperately searches the water, which allows the children to escape with the crown. Disgraced, Fatback and Clemens skip town that night.

The children reach Dr. Loy, present him with the crown, and ask him to be the new king. He accepts, and the next day he holds a meeting with all the townspeople. King Loy changes the kingdom's motto from Let the People Serve the King to Let the King Serve the People, and announces that each citizen may choose his or her occupation. Thus, the kingdom shifts from totalitarianism to a constitutional monarchy.

The next part begins much like the first scene: The three children lie in the meadow. They visit with their friends, who are all hard at work at their new jobs. At first they beg for their food, but then realize they need occupations if they are going to survive. They get a job at the bakery under the tutelage of the lion, Hubert Knapsack. He gives them the job of baking a "dignified" cake for one of King Loy's official functions. They bake a cake in the form of King Loy himself, but the king dismisses the cake as inappropriate for the occasion and unbefitting his stature. When Hubert finds out, he is enraged and sues them. The children are tried in court, found guilty, and lose their jobs. When they ask how they are to eat, the king replies, "To decide that is not the function of a court of arbitration."

Soon after, the king awakes to discover the crown is once again missing. He calls a meeting of all the people under the assumption that the thief or thieves will not appear. Sure enough, the children are among the absent. After much speculation, the children appear with Holger and friends. They carry a bag that makes odd clinking sounds. They have changed the monarchy into a democracy by melting the crown down into many small crowns, one for each person.

The book ends as it began, with the acknowledgement that the story was made up.

== Illustrations ==
The Crown Snatchers has many illustrations by F. K. Waechter. They range from quickly sketched cartoons to comic strips to detailed pen and ink renderings and paintings (which, apart from the cover illustration, are printed in black and white). There is hardly a page in the book that does not have an illustration.

== Activities ==
The story is frequently interrupted by the characters discussing puzzles, recounting dreams, unrelated stories (usually unfinished with the suggestion that the reader think of an ending), or mere asides. The puzzles include simple fill-in-the-blanks and connect-the-dots games, visual puns, a Caesar cipher, a folding puzzle, a tessellation, and drawings which must be completed. There is silly poetry, illustrations from the characters' imaginations, several maps, a cut-out model of King Fatback, a story told phonetically using single letters and digits, and other features that defy simple description.

It is notable that many of the puns, puzzles, and jokes depend on word play, which must have resulted in substantial re-writing during translation. Besides names, the only German words that appear in The Crown Snatchers are "Baden Verboten" ("No Swimming"), which appear on the main map on a sign next to the river.

== Cast ==
Except for the three children, all of the characters in the main story are anthropomorphic animals.

- Robert, Joanna, and Moritz: The child protagonists
- Dr. Johannes Loy: The owl doctor
- King Fatback: The pig king
- The King's guards: various dogs
- Miss Bellmouse: The king's cat caretaker
- Mr. Prouch: The dog teacher
- Charley Coffer: The badger poet
- Littleboom: The rooster doctor
- Clemens: The king's cousin, also a pig
- Holger: The elephant gardener
- Helmut Helmutson: The fox farmer
- Bostock: The seal innkeeper
- Captain Hubble: The crocodile swimming pool manager
- Hubert Knapsack: The lion baker
- Eberhard Luck: The bear forester
- Rushbank: The beaver fix-it man
- Phineas: the fish storekeeper
- Carlo Spannagel: the donkey carpenter
