= Joharapuram =

- village
- Interactive map of Joharapuram
- Location in Andhra Pradesh, India Joharapuram (India)
- Coordinates: 15.4074°N 77.4029°E
- Country: India
- State: Andhra Pradesh
- District: Kurnool
- Talukas: Alur

Population
  - Total: 4,125

Languages
  - Official: Telugu
- Time zone: UTC+5:30 (IST)
- PIN: 518347
- Telephone code: 08523

Joharapuram is a village located in Aspari mandal in Kurnool district of Andhra Pradesh, India.
