= Beerappa =

Dravidian folk deity in Southern India

Beerappa (also Beeranna, Bheerappa, Beeraiah, Beerayya, Beereswara, Beeralingeswara and variants) is a regional Dravidian folk deity of the Kuruba community of Karnataka, Telangana and Andhra Pradesh in South India.

Beerayya Patnalu is the celebration of Beerappa's marriage with Kamaraathi every five, seven, or nine years. Beernollu, the traditional priests of Kuruba community perform the marriage ceremony of the deity. It is a Jathara-like celebration every and is the biggest festival of Kurubas. Relatives, near and far and guests are invited to this festival. The main temple is situated in Yadagiri Mandal, Hayyal (B) village, Karnataka. The festival is celebrated for nine days. Events include Pochamma Bonalu, Paalu Neyyi, Ganga Bonalu, Sarugu, Nagavalli Patnam, post-marriage Oggu Katha, Yetti Mullelu and Garadi.

== See also ==
- Gorehabba, festival related to the deity in Karnataka, India
- Biroba, folk deity of the Dhangar community in Maharashtra, India
