= Midde Ramulu =

- Born: 1941; Karimnagar, India
- Died: 25 November 2010 (aged 69); Hyderabad, India
- Known for: Oggu Katha

Midde Ramulu (born 1941 - 25 November 2010) was an Indian folklore artist. He was a popular exponent of Oggu Katha.

== Early life ==
Midde Ramulu was born in Hanmajipeta village of Vemulawada, Rajanna Sircilla district, Telangana. He did not go to school.

== Career ==
Midde Ramulu was popular and toured many countries. He is popular for his Renuka Yellamma katha, Mallanna katha, Gangagauri, Balanagamma or any other mythological story, he depicted all characters of the stories before the eyes of the spellbound audience with his style.

He was also a member of the AP State Cultural Council.

== Death ==
He died from cancer.
