= Sutamarchán =

Coordinates: 5°36′N 73°38′W

- Municipality and town
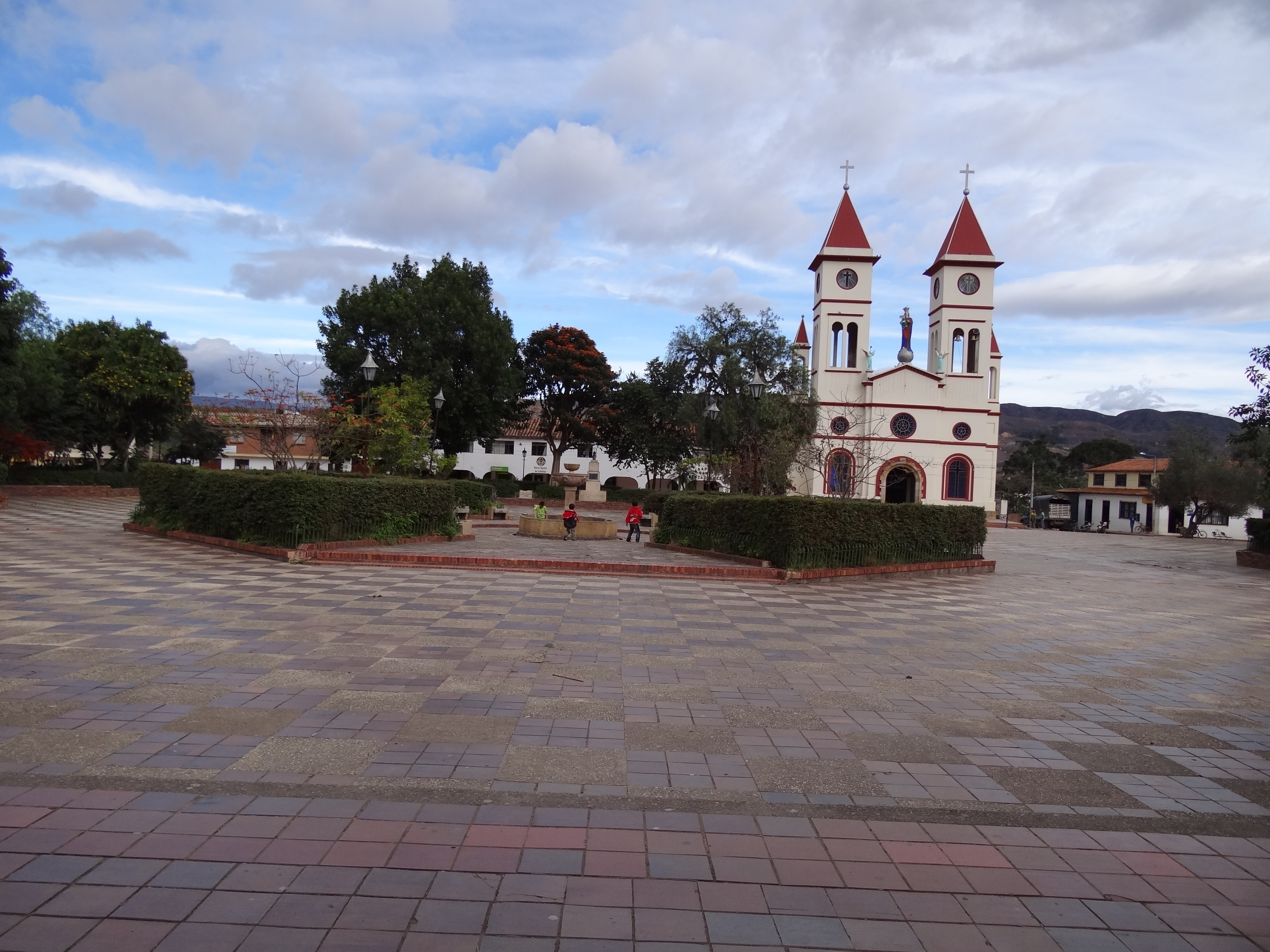
- Central square and church of Sutamarchán

- Flag

- Location of the municipality and town of Sutamarchán in the Boyacá Department of Colombia
- Country: Colombia
- Department: Boyacá Department
- Province: Ricaurte Province
- Founded: 14 December 1556
- Founder: Antonio de Santana

Government
  - Mayor: Miguel Andrés Rodríguez Saavedra (2020-2023)

Area
  - Municipality and town: 102 km^{2} (39 sq mi)
  - Urban: 8 km^{2} (3.1 sq mi)
- Elevation: 1,800 m (5,900 ft)

Population (2015)
  - Municipality and town: 5,916
  - Density: 58.0/km^{2} (150/sq mi)
  - Urban: 1,352
- Time zone: UTC-5 (Colombia Standard Time)
- Website: Official website

Sutamarchán is a town and municipality in the Ricaurte Province, part of the department of Boyacá of Colombia. Sutamarchán is situated on the Altiplano Cundiboyacense at 44 kilometres (27 mi) from the department capital Tunja. It borders Santa Sofía in the north, Sáchica and Villa de Leyva in the east, Saboyá in the west and Ráquira and Tinjacá in the south.

== Etymology ==
The name Sutamarchán is derived from the Chibcha sovereign Suta and Spanish marchán: "Merchant of the sovereign Suta". Marchán refers to Pedro Merchan de Velasco, who was an 18th-century encomendero of Suta.

== History ==
Sutamarchán in the times before the Spanish conquest was inhabited by the Muisca, organized in their loose Muisca Confederation. Sutamarchán was ruled by the zaque of Hunza.

Modern Sutamarchán was founded on December 14, 1556, by Antonio de Santana.

== Economy ==
The main economical activities of Sutamarchán are agriculture, livestock farming and tourism. Among the agricultural products potatoes, onions, tomatoes, barley, maize, grapes and the Colombian fruit curuba are cultivated. The town is famous for its longaniza sausages. Tourism is mainly religious; tourists visit the Santo Ecce Homo Convent.

Since June 15, 2004, a Tomatina festival, like the famous original in Buñol, Spain, is celebrated in Sutamarchán.

== Born in Sutamarchán ==
- Pedro González (humorist)

== Gallery ==
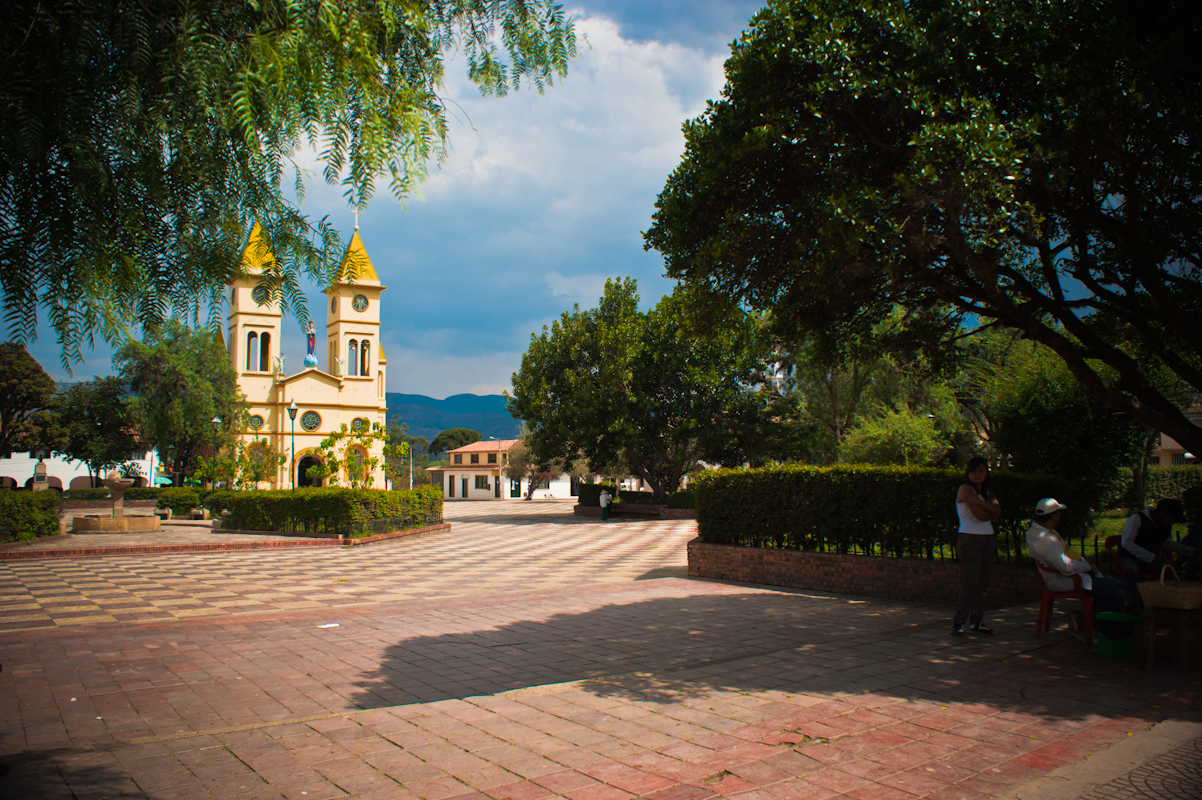
Church and central square

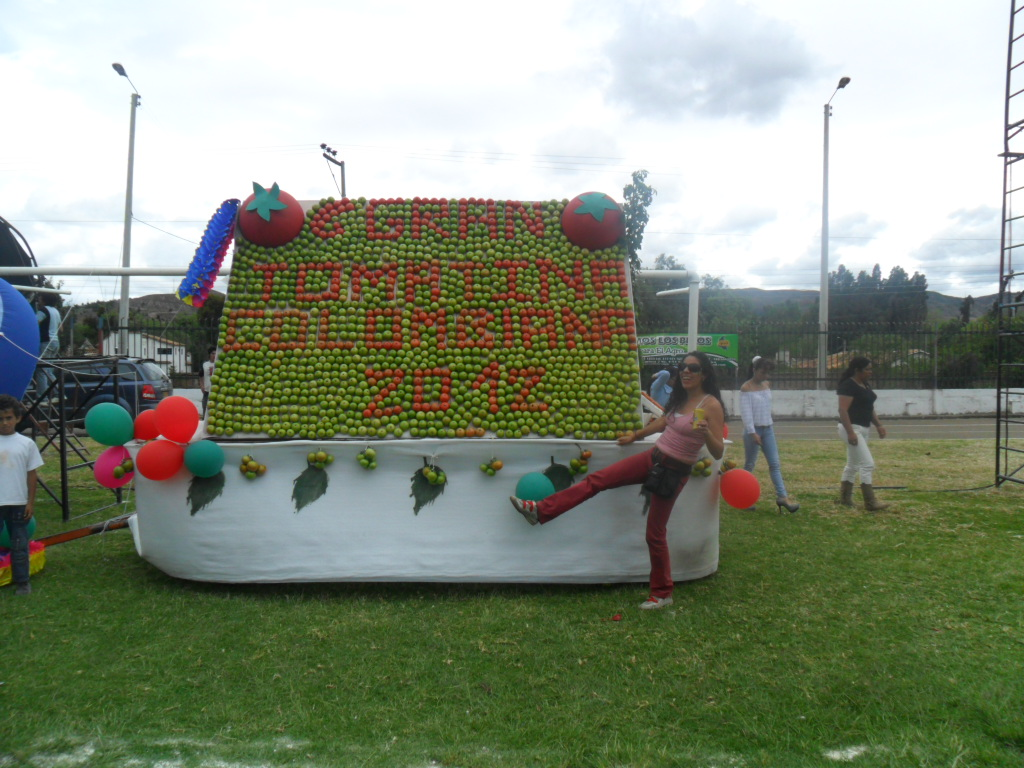
Tomatina festival Sutamarchán

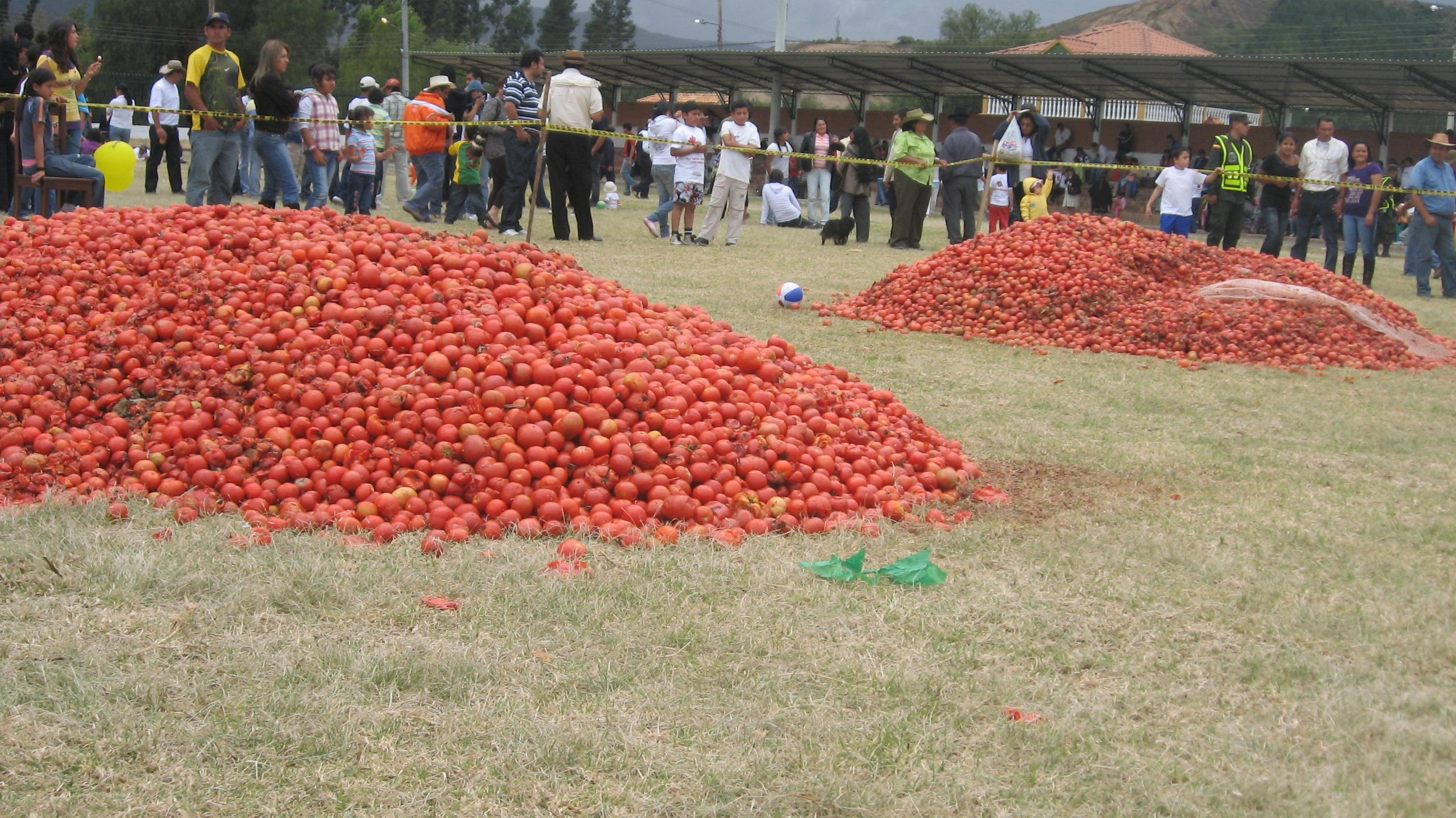
Tomatina festival

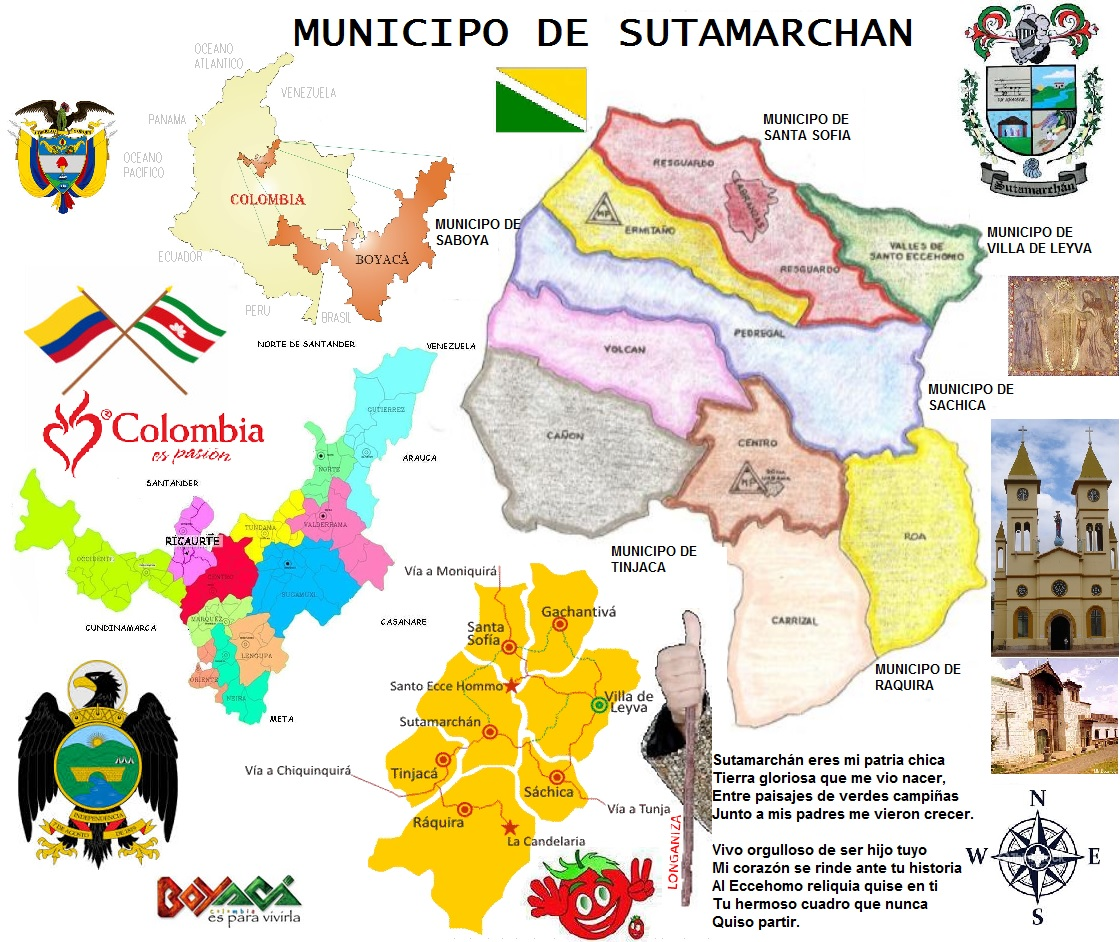
Touristic map of Sutamarchán and surroundings
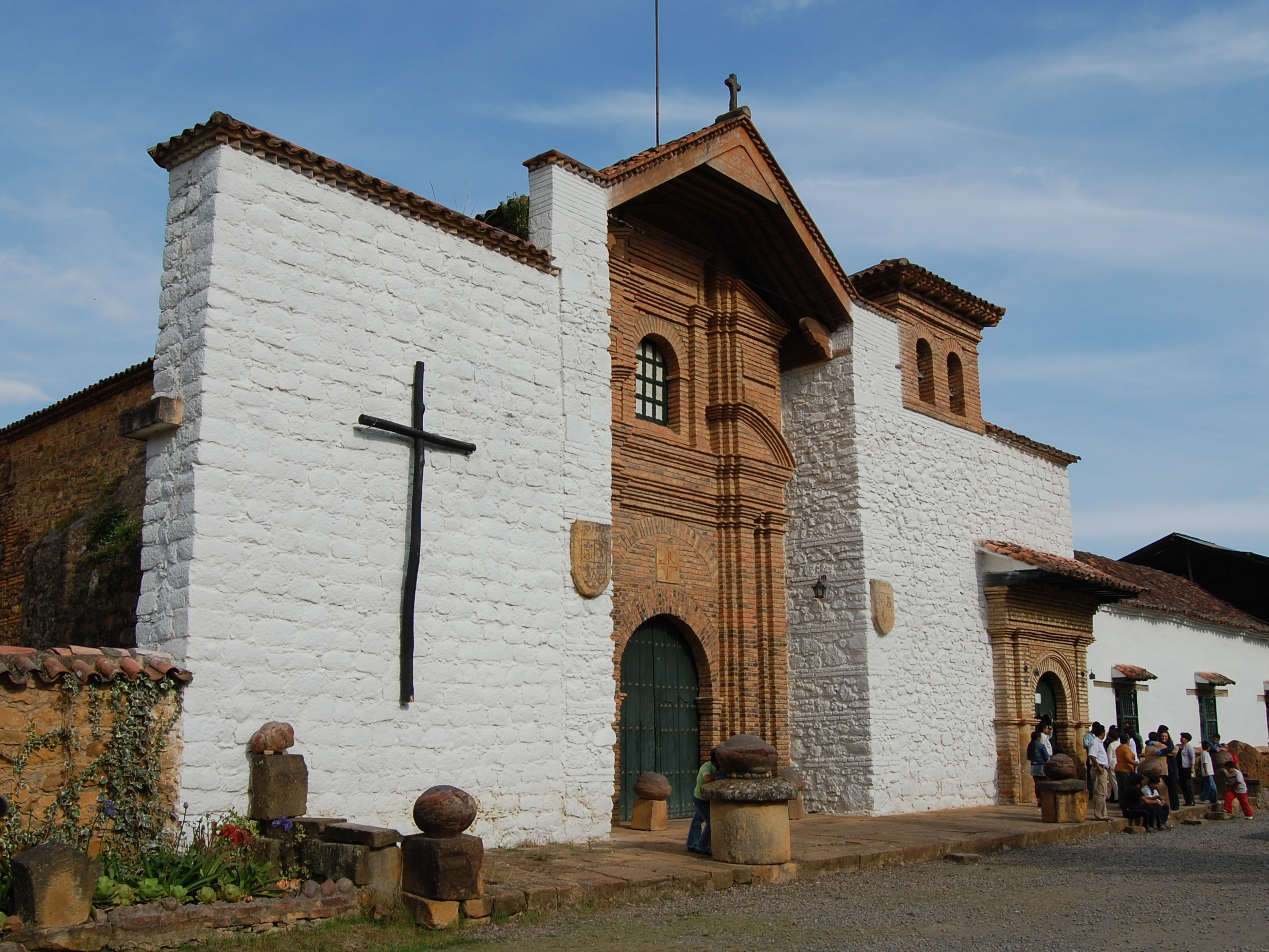
Santo Ecce Homo Convent

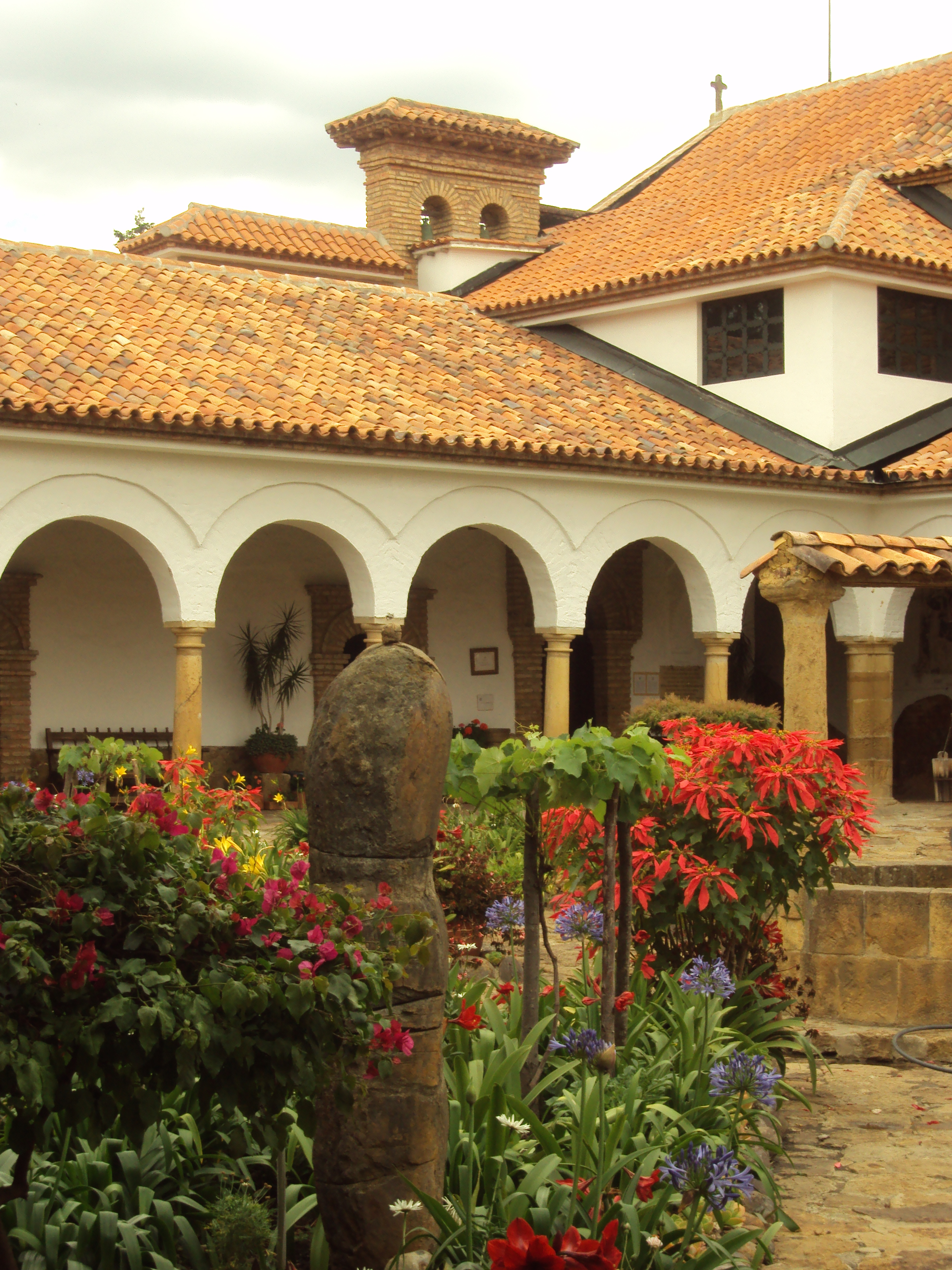
Santo Ecce Homo Convent

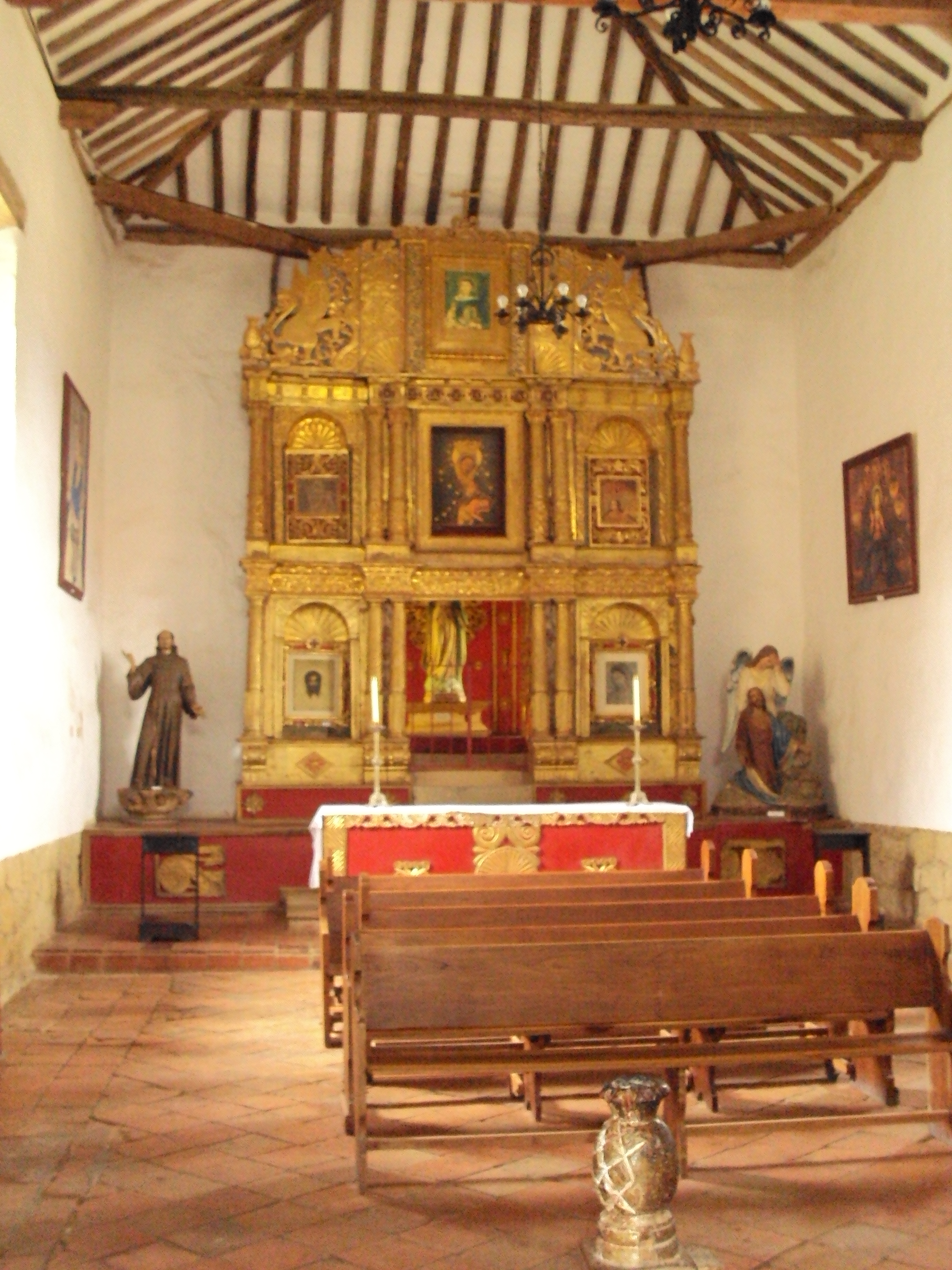
Santo Ecce Homo Convent interior

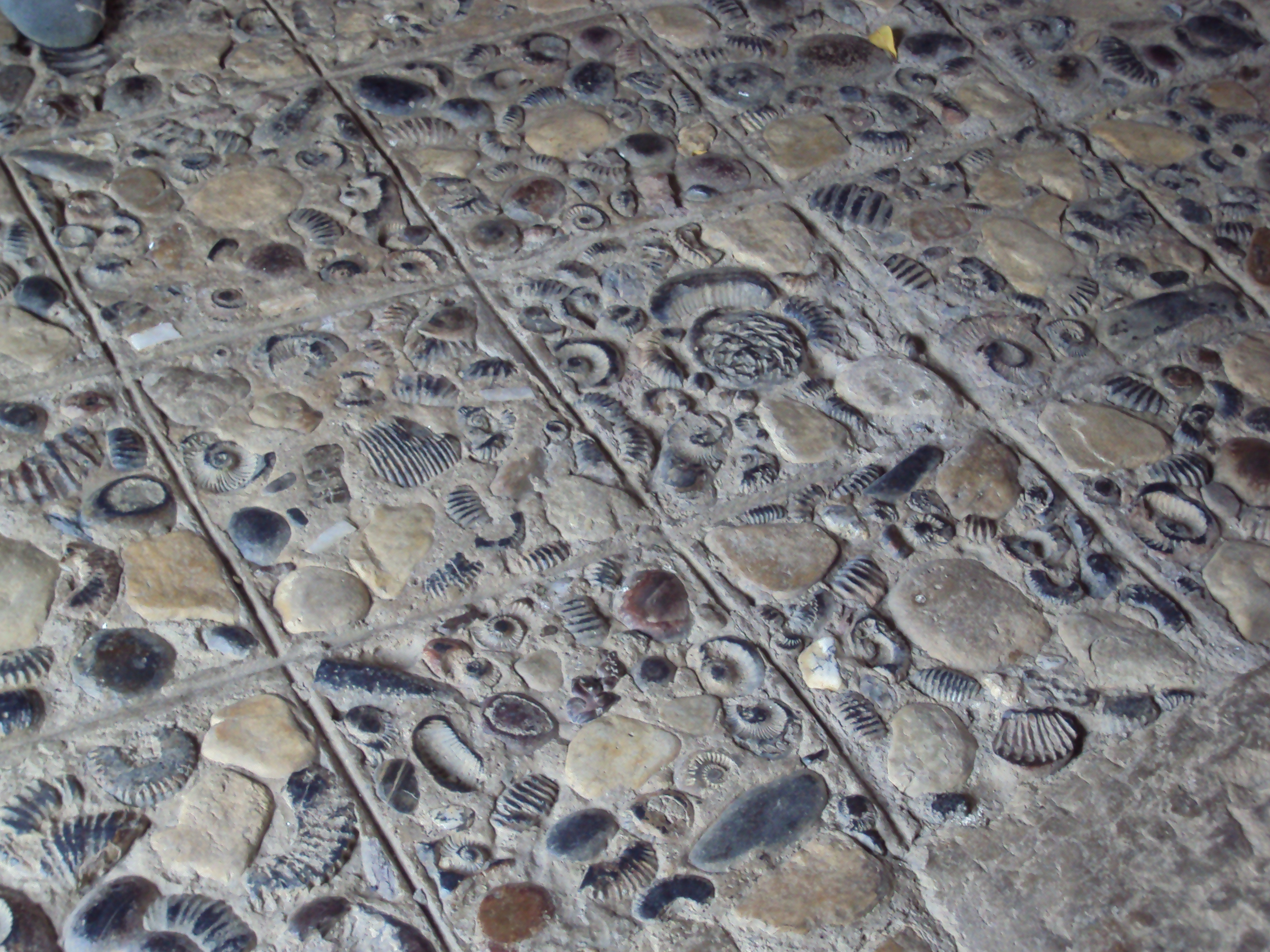
Floor with fossils in the Convent

== Panoramas ==
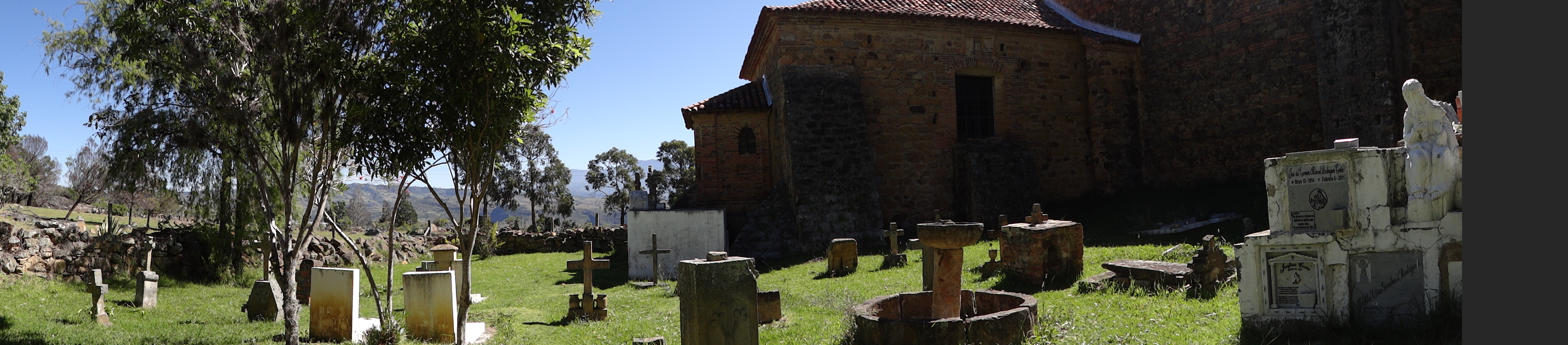
Cemetery of the Santo Ecce Homo Convent, Sutamarchán
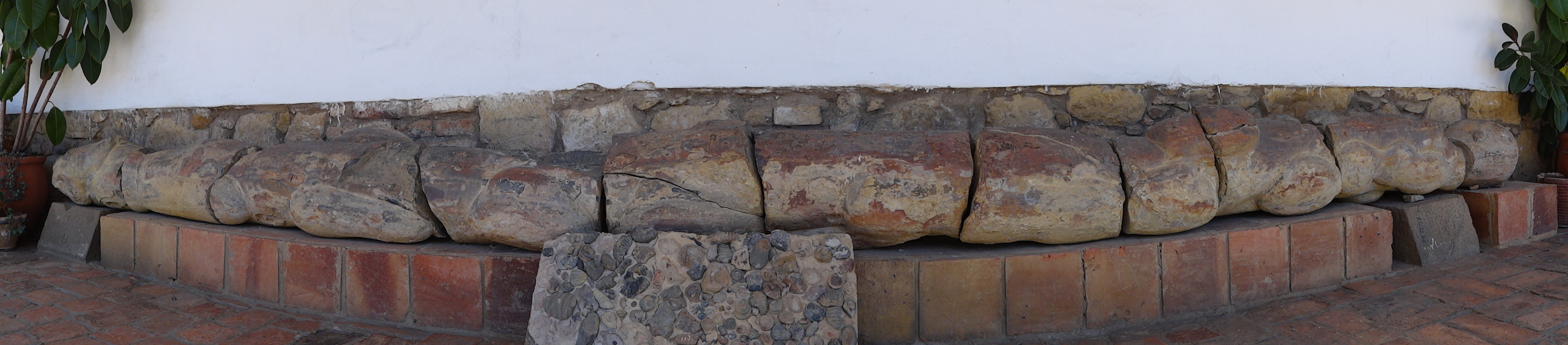
Snake fossil in the Santo Ecce Homo Convent, Sutamarchán
