= Funtasia Water Park =

Amusement park in Patna, India

Water Island Water Park
- Location: Patna, India
- Operated by: Takshila Seas & Resorts Pvt. Ltd.
- Opened: 2012
- Area: approx.5 acres
- Website: funtasiaisland.com

Funtasia Water Park is an amusement and water park located in Patna, Bihar, India. The park contains many attractions such as numerous water slides and water playgrounds. The park is the first water park in Bihar. The park is owned and administered by Mumbai-based Takshila Seas & Resorts Private Limited.

== Location ==
The water theme park is located on the New Bypass road. It is 11 km away from Patna Junction and about 16 km from Patna Airport.

== Park attractions ==
- Water slides
- Wave pool
- Swimming pools
- Kids water slides
- Two Kids wave pool
- Multi cuisine restaurant
- Coffee shops, Souvenir's shop, Banquet hall

== La tomatina Holi ==
In March 2013, the Holi festival was celebrated on the pattern of La Tomatina, a traditional Spanish festival in which participants throw tomatoes and get involved in this tomato fight purely for fun. Nearly 1000 kg of tomatoes were squashed.

== See also ==
- List of water parks
