= Poodur =

Poodur Pudur
- Village
- Location within Telangana Location within India
- Coordinates: 18.624080°N 78.955187°E
- Country: India
- State: Telangana
- District: Jagtial

Government
  - Type: Major Gram panchayat
  - Body: Government of Telangana

Area
  - Total: 12.18 km^{2} (4.70 sq mi)
- Elevation: 378 m (1,240 ft)

Population (2019)
  - Total: 6,500 (approx.)
  - Density: 530/km^{2} (1,400/sq mi)

Languages
  - Official: Telugu
- Time zone: UTC+5:30 (IST)
- PIN: 505501
- Website: www.maapallepoodur.blogspot.in

Poodur or Pudur is a village in Kodimial mandal, Jagtial district, Telangana, India.

== Demographics ==
Telugu is the Local Language here. Total population of Poodur is 5878. Males are 2,938 and females are 2,940 living in 1513 houses according to the 2011 census. Total area of Poodur is 1218 hectares. One small river flows besides the village. Lord Narasimhaswamy temple stood on BODA GUTTA (hillock), which is north side to the village. Poodur is located on NH563 Highway, and 19 km from District Headquarters and 29 km from Karimnagar.

Schools: Zilla Parishad High School with BC hostel and Vivekananda High School

Bank: Indian Bank
