= Palazzo della Credenza =

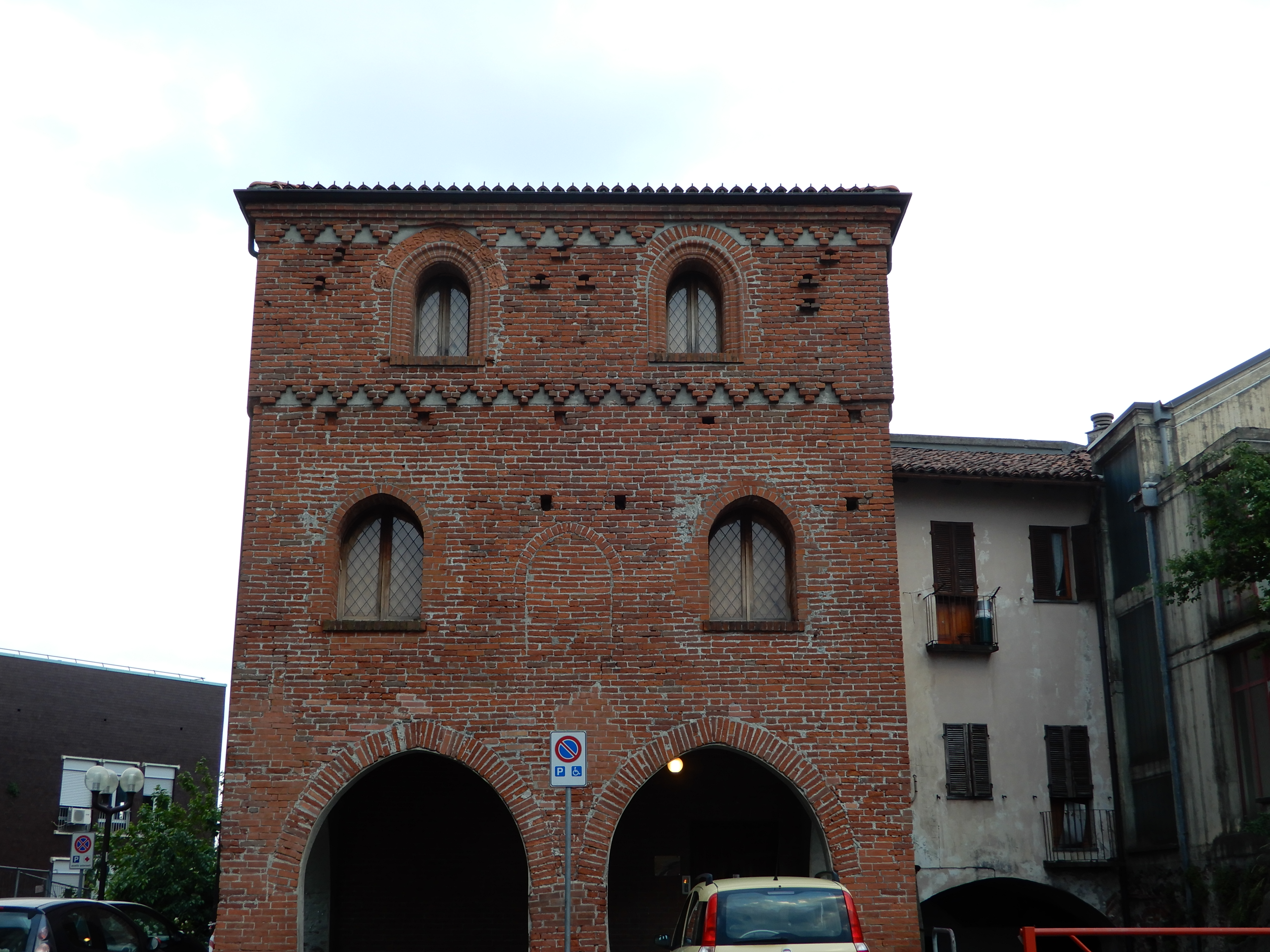
- The Palazzo della Credenza in 2020
- Click on the map for a fullscreen view

General information
- Architectural style: Gothic
- Location: Ivrea, Italy
- Coordinates: 45°28′0.5″N 7°52′21″E

The Palazzo della Credenza (Piedmontese: Palass dla Chërdensa) is a historic building located in Ivrea, Italy.

== History ==
The building was built in the early 14th century in what was then the market square in the upper town of Ivrea to house the seat of the council of the free commune of Ivrea. This institution was known as Credenza, whence the name of the building.

== Description ==
The building comprises three floors and is built with bricks. The main façade features a portico with ogival arches and pointed arch windows on the upper floors.

== Gallery ==
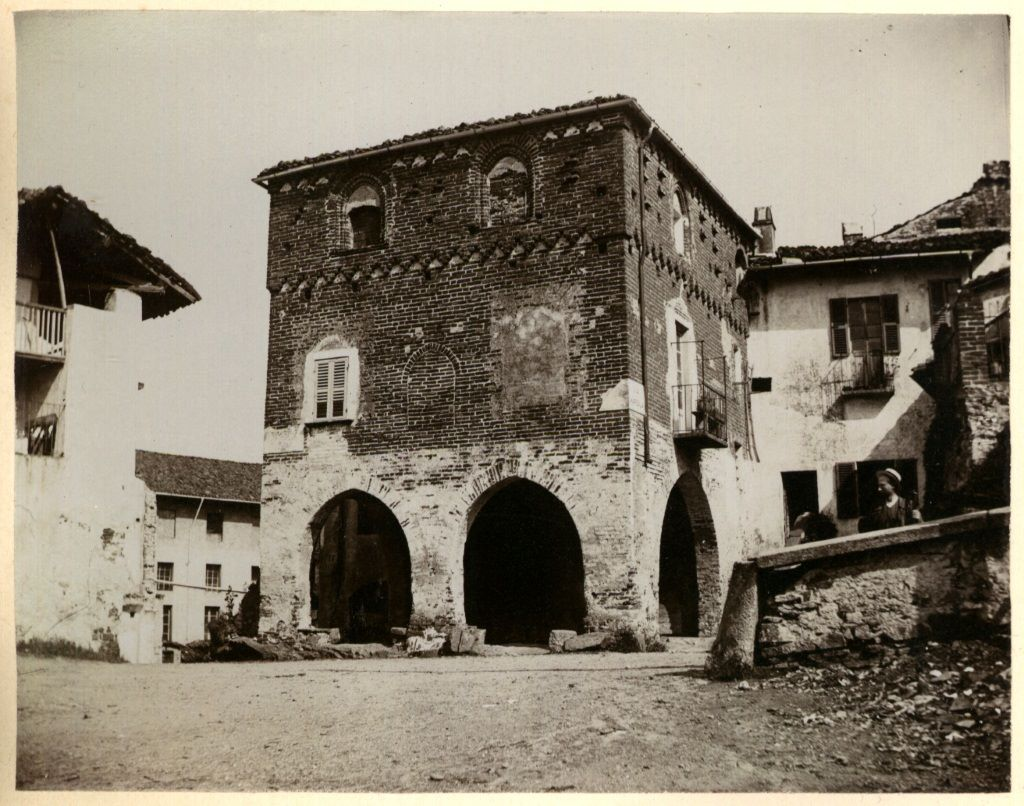

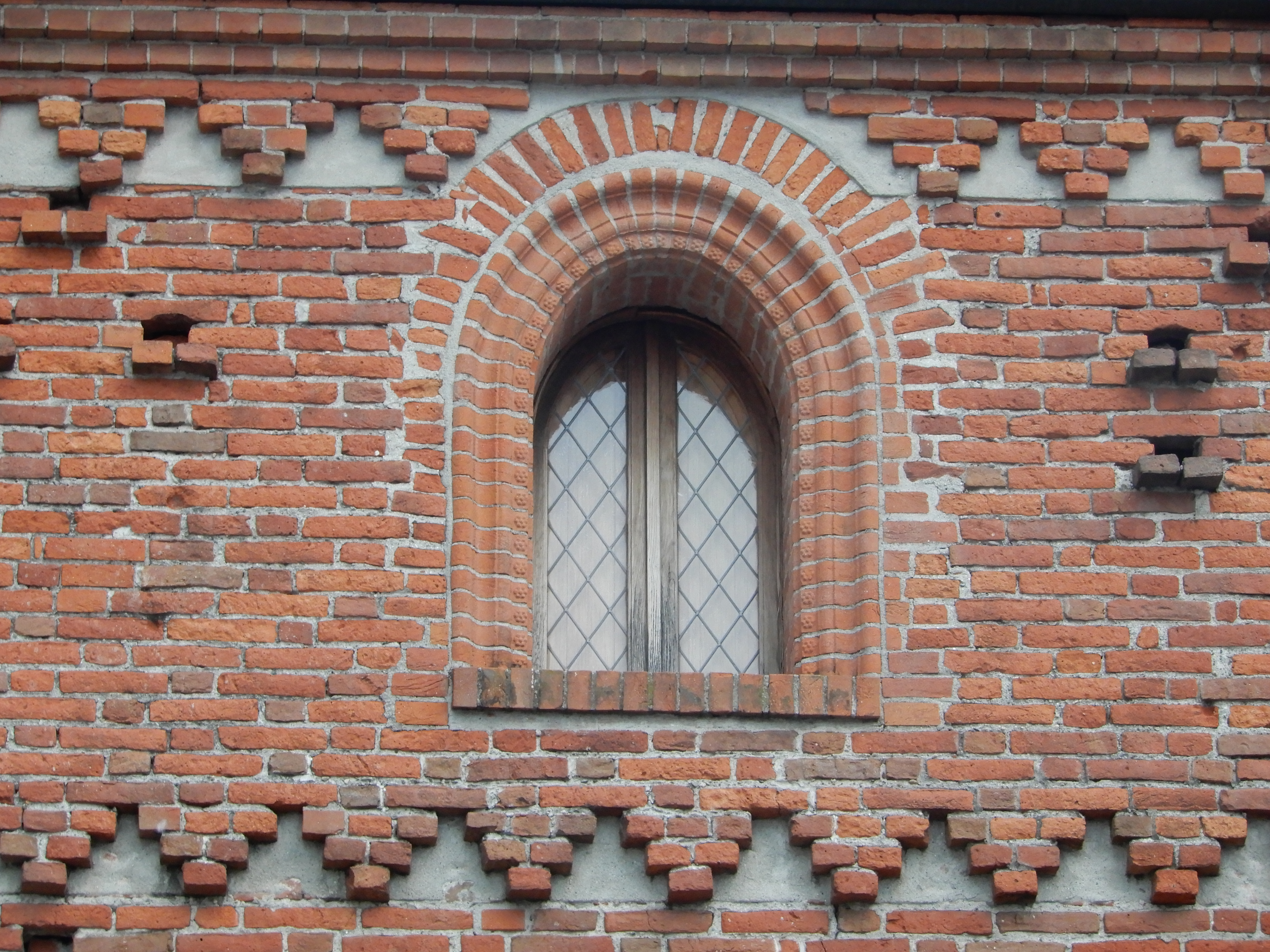

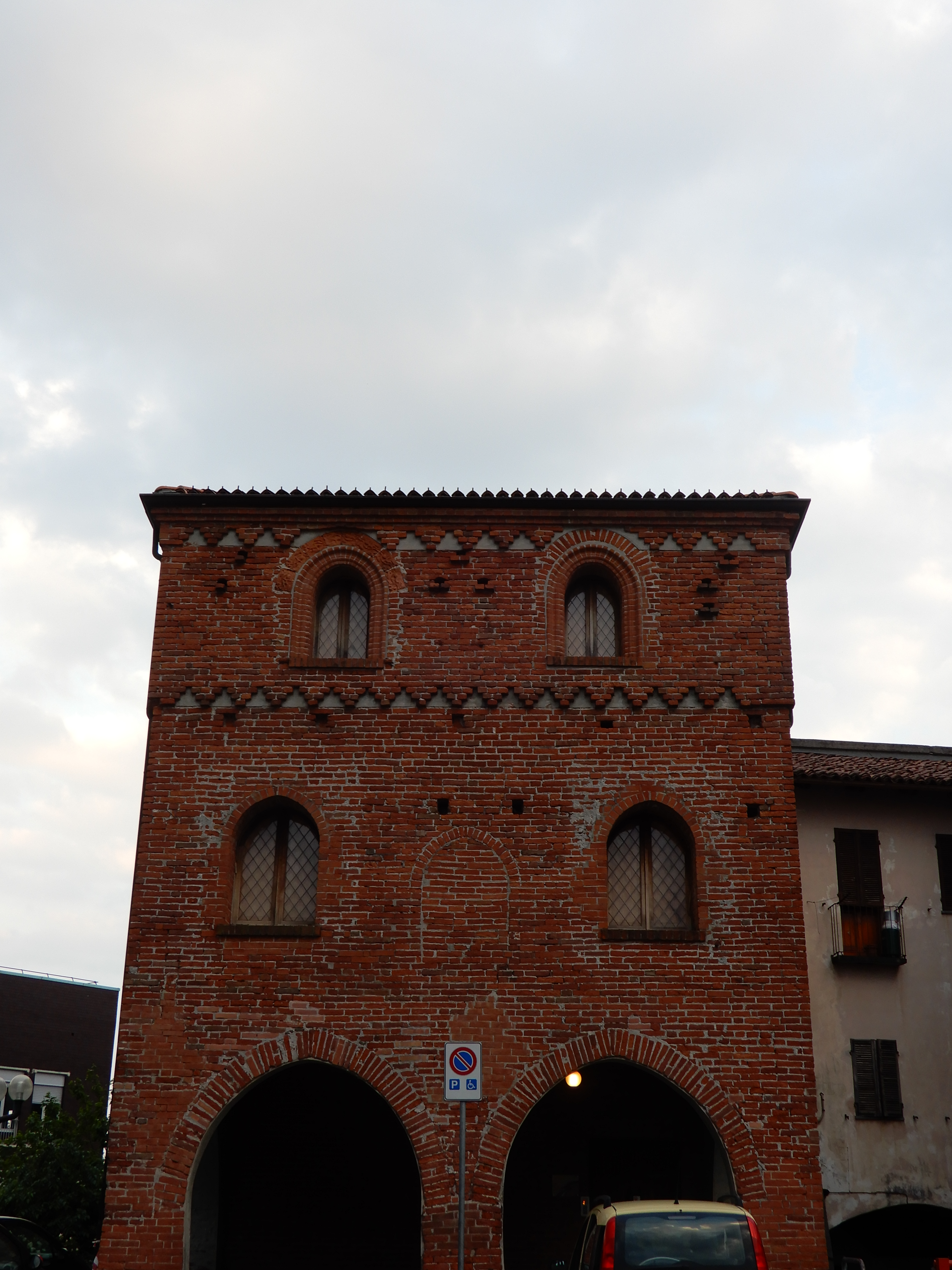
