= Food fight =

Chaotic collective behavior involving throwing food at each other

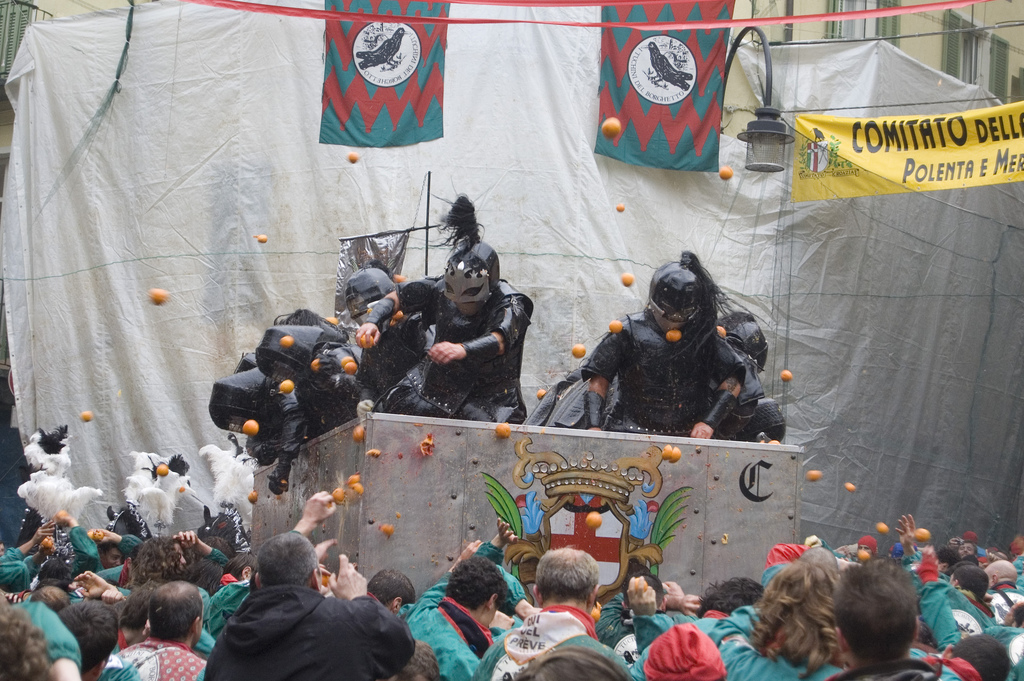
La Battaglia Delle Arance (The Battle of the Oranges) in Ivrea, Italy

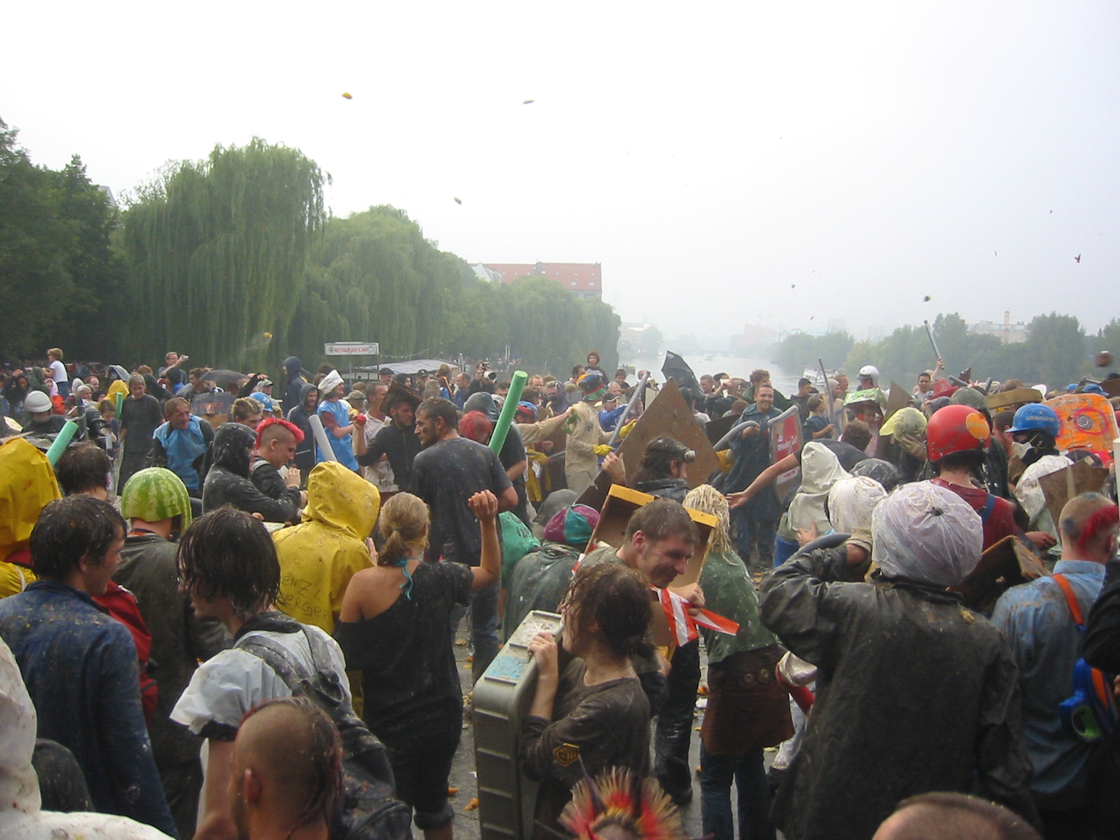
Gemüseschlacht (The Vegetable Fight) in Berlin, Germany

A food fight is a form of chaotic collective behavior, in which foods are thrown at others in the manner of projectiles. Food fights may be impromptu examples of rebellion, violence, or for amusement; however, they can also be planned events. In organized food fights, the food weapons are usually all of one kind, or of a limited variety, while in impromptu food fights (for example, in a school cafeteria), any kind of food available may be used.

Food fights have a long history throughout the world as a form of festive public entertainment or pastime. They have traditionally been popular since the early Middle Ages in Europe during seasonal festivals, especially in the summertime. For example, Spanish La Tomatina is still regularly held every August in the Valencian town of Buñol, in which participants pelt each other with tomatoes, as is the Battle of the Oranges held in the Italian town of Ivrea where, as the name would suggest, the oranges are used instead. An example from outside of Europe is the Chinese "Tofu Festival". It is held on the 13th day of the first month of the lunar calendar in Shegangxia village, Fogang County, Guangdong Province. Participants throw slabs of tofu at each other.

Food fights have occurred in the meetings of the Legislative Yuan of Taiwan.

Food fights have also become a common element in slapstick comedy, with the pie in the face gag being especially well-known. Food fights are frequently featured in children's television and books, usually as an example of childish, destructive or reckless behavior. Movies with notable food fights include The Battle of the Century (1927), The Great Race (1965), Blazing Saddles (1974), and Animal House (1978). A custard pie fight was filmed for Dr. Strangelove (1964), but was cut before the final print.

== See also ==
- Food loss and waste
