= Colorado-Texas Tomato War =

American annual tomato fight

The Colorado-Texas Tomato War is an annual event held at Twin Lakes, Lake County, Colorado. It was started in 1982 by local hotel owner Taylor Adams, ended circa 1991, and was revived in 2011. The event, held in September, pits hundreds of Coloradans and Texans throwing ripe tomatoes at one another, as Coloradans attempt (and generally succeed) in overrunning an "Alamo" built of straw bales and defended by the typically outnumbered Texans.

The combatants are identified by souvenir T-shirts sold by Ms. Adams. The event is based on the rivalry perceived by Coloradans against Texan visitors to the state. The tomato war is considered the source for the bumper sticker "Keep Colorado beautiful: put a Texan on a bus."
