= Carnival of Ivrea =

Food fight festival in Ivrea, Italy

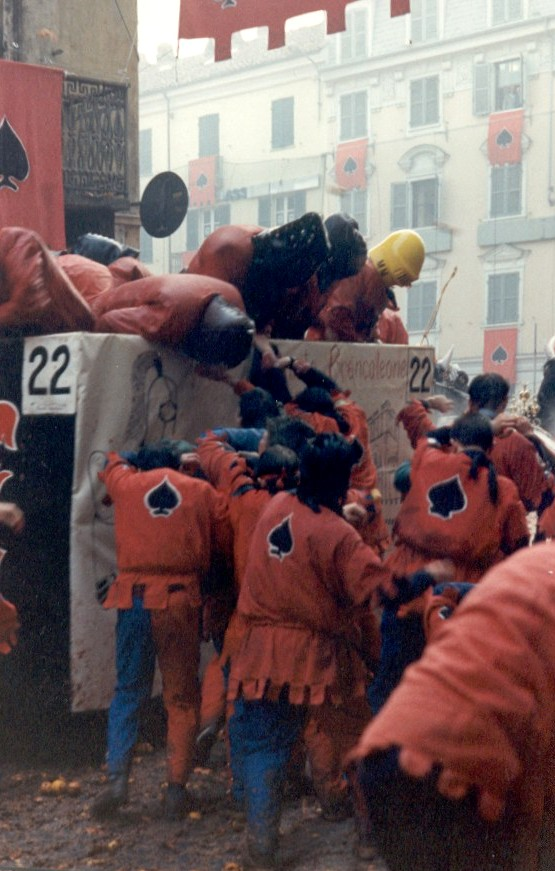
The Asso di Picche, founded in 1947 and wearing a black Ace of Spades on red, is the oldest of the nine pedestrian teams of orange throwers that partake in the Battle of the Oranges. Here they battle against one of the approximately forty Aranceri Carri da Getto – orange-throwers in carts.

The Carnival of Ivrea (Italian: Carnevale di Ivrea; Piedmontese: Carlevé d'Ivrèja) is a festival in the Northern Italian city of Ivrea that includes a tradition of throwing oranges between organized groups, known as the "Battle of the Oranges". It is the largest food fight in Italy and surrounding countries.

== History ==
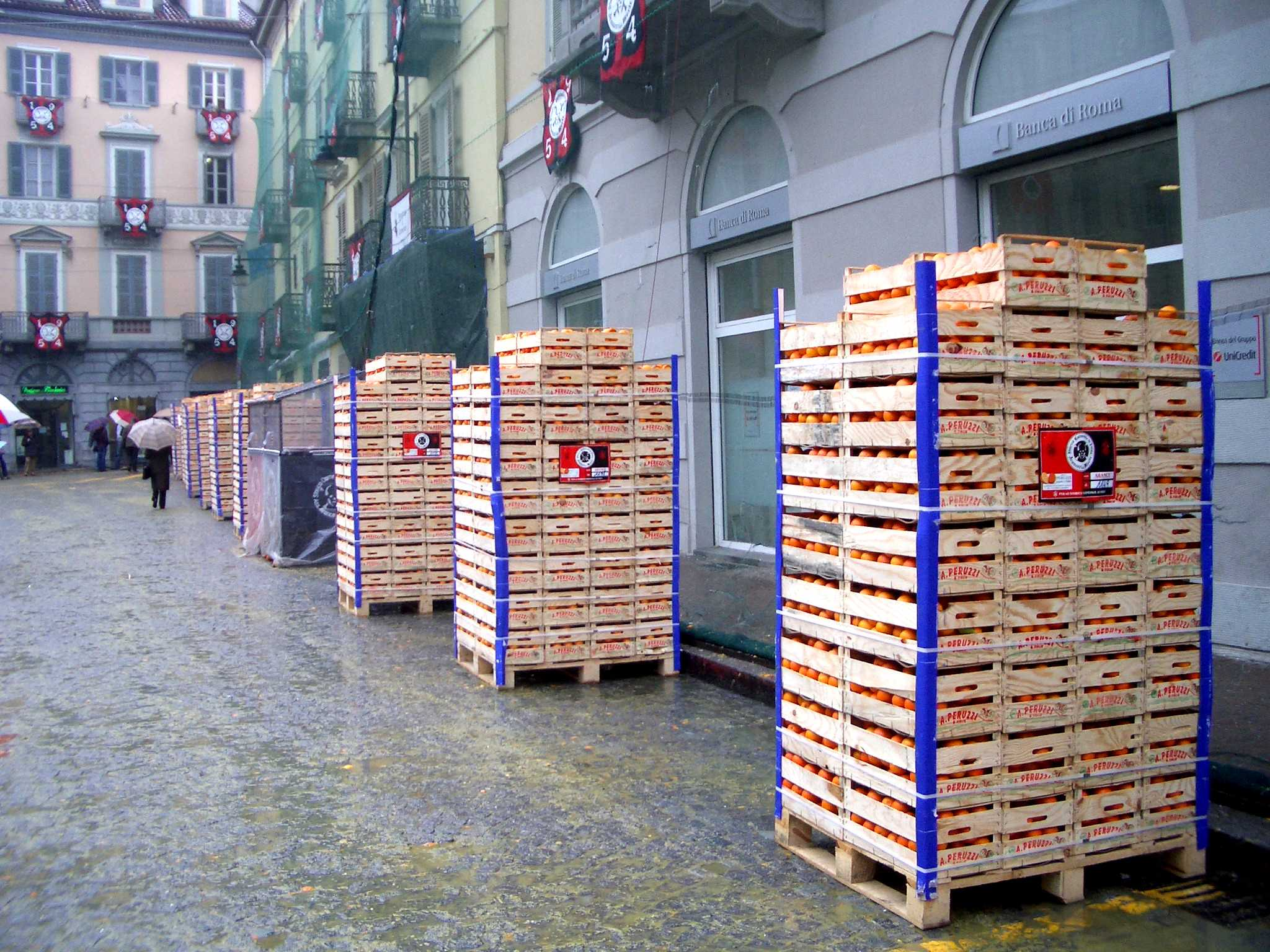
Stockpile of "ammunition" for the battle

Regarding the origins, a popular account has it that the battle commemorates the city's defiance against the city's tyrant, who is either a member of the Ranieri family or a conflation of the 12th-century Ranieri di Biandrate and the 13th-century Marquis William VII of Montferrat. This tyrant attempted to rape a young commoner (often specified as a miller's daughter) on the evening of her wedding, supposedly exercising the droit du seigneur. The tyrant's plan backfired when the young woman instead decapitated him, after which the populace stormed and burned the palace. Each year, a young girl is chosen to play the part of Violetta, the defiant young woman.

Every year the citizens remember their liberation with the "Battle of the Oranges", where teams of aranceri (orange handlers) on foot throw oranges (representing old weapons and stones) against aranceri riding in carts (representing the tyrant's ranks). During the 19th-century French occupation of Italy, the Carnival of Ivrea was modified to add representatives of the French army. Another adaptation of the story has the oranges used to symbolize the removed testicles of the tyrant.

The oldest rituals of Ivrea Carnival include a large bonfire and are similar to ancient celebrations linked to the end of winter and the rise of the new spring.

The battle was on hiatus during 2021, but returned in 2023. Other cancellations occurred in 1915–18 & 1940–45.

== Celebration ==
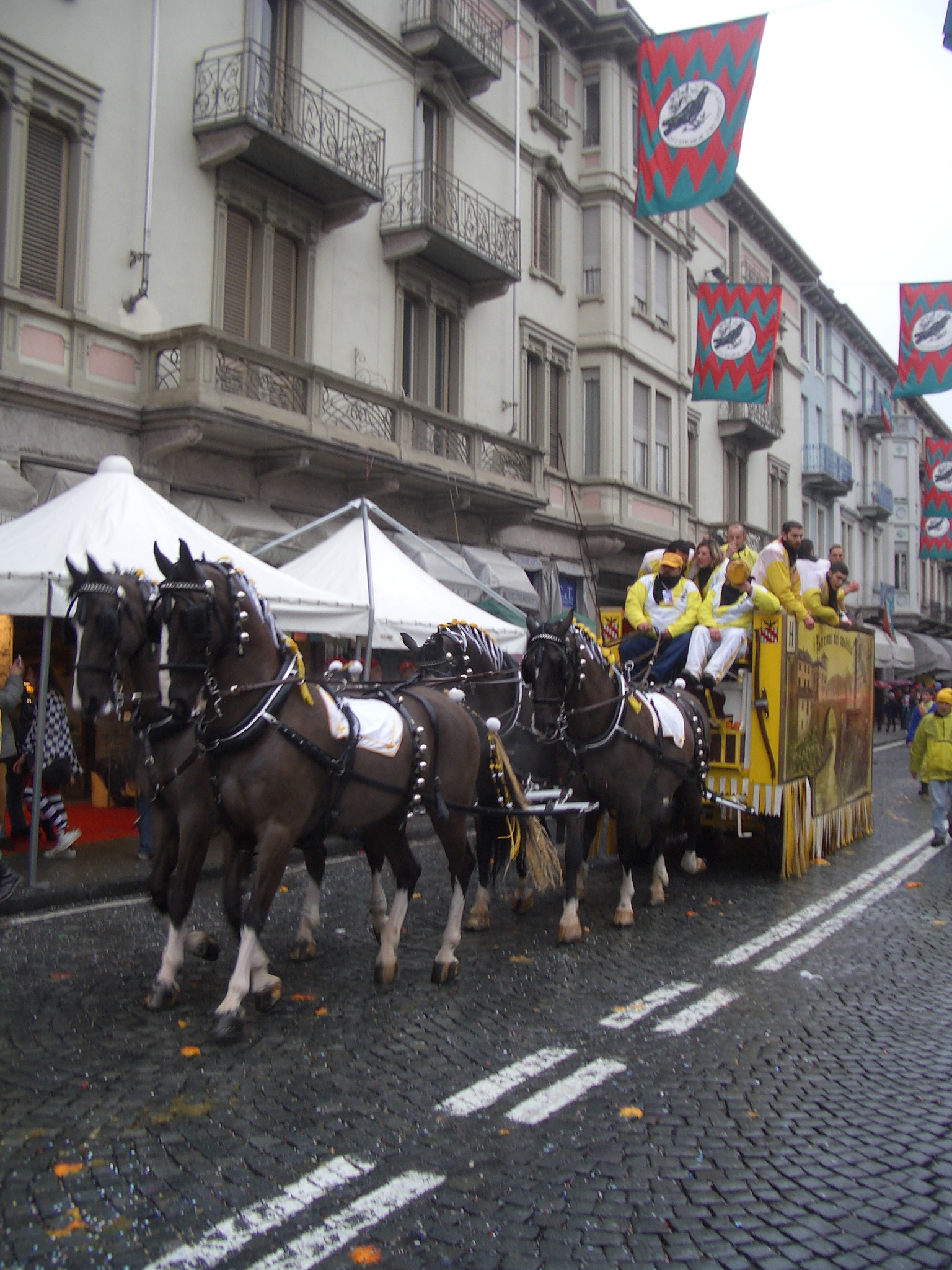
A carriage pulled by four horses that will be used in the battle

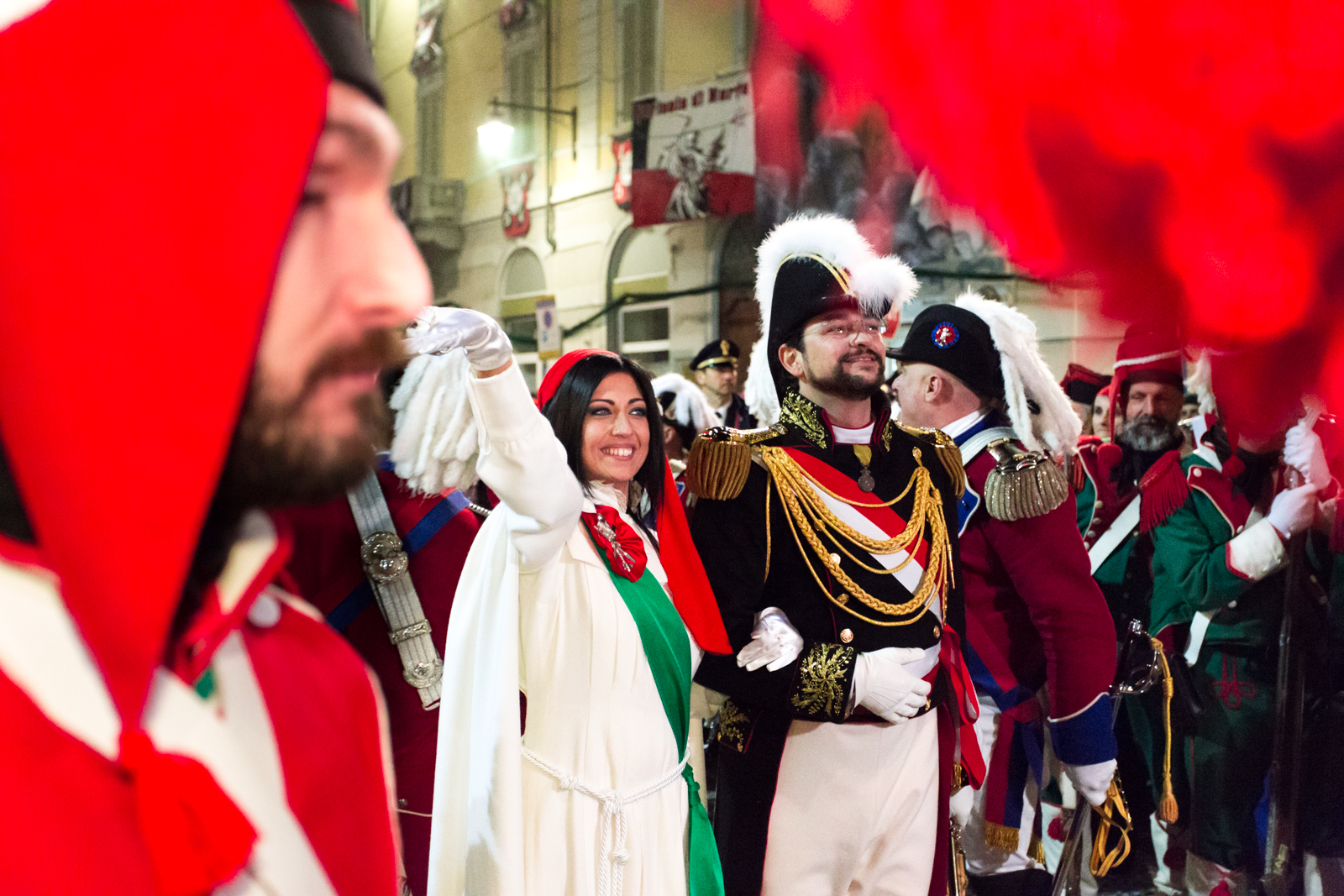
Mugnaia

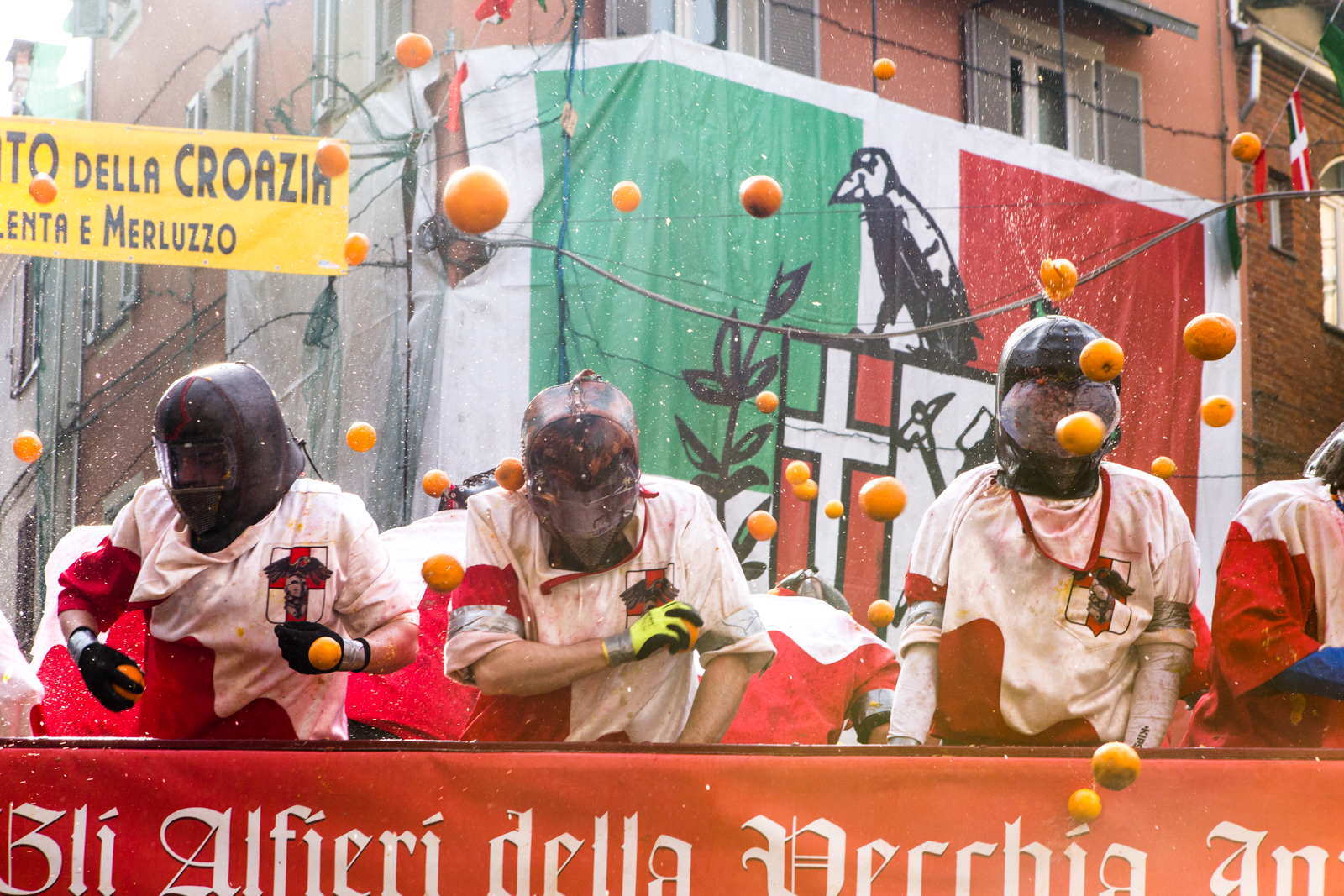
Battle

The core celebration is based on a locally famous "Battle of the Oranges" that involves some thousands of townspeople, divided into nine combat teams, who throw oranges at each other—with considerable violence—during the traditional carnival days: Sunday, Monday and Tuesday. The Carnival takes place in February (occasionally in March); it ends on the night of Shrove Tuesday with a solemn funeral. Traditionally, at the end of the silent march that closes the Carnival, the "General" says goodbye to everyone with the classical phrase in dialect "arvedse a giobia a 'n bot", translated as "we'll see each other on Thursday at one", referring to the Thursday on which the Carnival will start the next year.

== Miller's daughter ==
One of the citizens is elected Mugnaia (miller's daughter). Legend has it that Ivrea was once ruled by an evil duke (identified by historians with Guido III, against whom the population really rose, demolishing his castle, in 1194). After the miller's daughter (la Mugnaia) Violetta got married, the duke claimed his droit du seigneur, the right to spend a night with each newly wed woman, and forced her into his castle. Once in the duke's rooms, Violetta used the opportunity to cut his head off, starting a revolution that eventually brought about the destruction of the castle. Today the carriages are said to represent the duke's army and the orange throwers the revolutionaries.

Originally beans were thrown, then apples. Later, in the 19th century, oranges came to represent the stones thrown at the king's castle in order to demolish it. The origin of the tradition of throwing oranges is not well understood, particularly as oranges do not grow in the foothills of the Italian Alps and must be imported from Sicily. In 1994, an estimated 265,000 kilograms (584,000 lb) of oranges were brought to the city, mainly coming from the leftovers of the winter crop in southern Italy.

== The teams ==
The historical foot "aranceri" teams that participate in the defense of Ivrea against the Tyrant's carted henchmen are 9:

- Aranceri Asso di Picche: red and blue jersey with black neck scarf. Their symbol is a single spade and their home ground is the main town square, which they share with the second oldest throwing team. Created in 1947.
- Aranceri della Morte: black jersey, red pants. Their symbol is a white skull. Created in 1954.
- Aranceri Tuchini del Borghetto: green jersey, red pants and a black crow in a white field on the back. Created in 1964.
- Aranceri degli Scacchi: chequered black and white jersey with an orange tower as their symbol. Created in 1964.
- Aranceri Pantera Nera: black jersey with a black panther on a yellow field on the back. Created in 1965.
- Aranceri Scorpioni d'Arduino: yellow jersey, green pants and a black scorpion as their symbol. Created in 1966.
- Aranceri Diavoli: red and yellow jersey with a red devil. Created in 1973.
- Aranceri Mercenari: maroon jersey, yellow pants. Their symbol is a yellow star with maroon swords. Created in 1974.
- Aranceri Credendari: blue jersey and yellow pants, the Palazzo della Credenza and the town arms as their symbol. Created in 1985.

== See also ==
- La Tomatina – a tomato fight in Spain
- Songkran – during which water fights are held in Thailand
