= Aspari =

- Mandal
- Interactive map of Aspari
- Location in Andhra Pradesh, India Aspari (India)
- Coordinates: 15.4833°N 77.3833°E
- Country: India
- State: Andhra Pradesh
- District: Kurnool

Government
  - Type: Sarpanch

Population (2001)
  - Total: 7,263

Languages
  - Official: Telugu
- Time zone: UTC+5:30 (IST)
- Postal code: 518437
- Vehicle registration: AP 21

Aspari is a village and mandal under the Adoni revenue division in Kurnool district of Andhra Pradesh, India.

== Etymology ==
The original name of Aspari is found in historical records as Ashwapuri. During Vijayanagara empire they used to rest horses in this place. So the name Ashwapuri in detail Ashwa in Sanskrit called as horse and puri means City.

== Demographics ==
Aspari is a large village located in Aspari of Kurnool district, Andhra Pradesh with a total 1410 families residing. The Aspari village has population of 7263 of which 3624 are males while 3639 are females as per Population Census 2011.

In Aspari village population of children ages 0–6 is 910 which makes up 12.53% of the total population of the village. Average Sex Ratio of Aspari village is 1004 which is higher than Andhra Pradesh state average of 993. Child Sex Ratio for the Aspari as per census is 912, lower than Andhra Pradesh average of 939.

Aspari village has a lower literacy rate compared to Andhra Pradesh. In 2011, the literacy rate of Aspari village was 56.63% compared to 67.02% of Andhra Pradesh. In Aspari male literacy stands at 69.03% while the female literacy rate was 44.46%.

In December 2023, GSI discovered additional gold mine in Aspari mandal.

=== Religion ===
As per the data of census 2011, the majority of the population of Aspari follows Hinduism followed by Islam and Christianity.

== Transport ==
=== Roads ===
Aspari is well connected by road with cities like Kurnool, Adoni, Bellary, Hyderabad and Bengaluru. The SH 33 connects to Adoni, Pattikonda, Bengaluru, Mantralayam. The SH 27 connects to Alur, Bellary, Kurnool and Hyderabad. Aspari contains a four road junction leads to these cities.

Aspari have two APSRTC bus stands one in four roads junction (Chowrasta) and other one is New bus stand. Another major road transport is private auto rickshaw's.

=== Railways ===
Aspari railway station (ASP) is 6 km away from village. The nearest railway stations from Aspari are Adoni (AD) 20 km and Guntakal Junction (GTL) 32 km.

There is a stream in Pappula Doddi village in Aspari mandal.

== Temples ==
- Lord Varasiddhi Vinayaka Temple
- Lord Bheemalingeswar Temple
- Janardhana Swamy Temple
- Ramatheertham Temple
- Lord Shiva Temple
- Gayathri Devi Temple
- Sai Baba Temple
- Maremma avva Temple
- Nagendra swamy Temple
- Kanyaka Parameshwari Temple
