= Kuruba =

Hindu caste

Kuruba (IPA: [kurubɐ]) is a Hindu caste native to the Indian states of Karnataka, Andhra Pradesh and Telangana. They are the third-largest caste group in Karnataka. Traditionally, these are shepherds who used to do the work of sheep/goat and animal husbandry and agriculture, in which they especially raised mixed herds of sheep and goats and cattle.

== Etymology ==
The term kuruba, meaning shepherd, is derived from kuri, meaning sheep in Kannada. Shepherding was traditionally their primary occupation and still is for many, who lead a nomadic lifestyle.

== History ==
Oral traditions of the Kurubas or Kuruma indicate their descent from Neolithic farming villages in South India which also kept cattle. Oral traditions indicate some of these original cattle-keeping agriculturalists branched off into new habitats and quickly came to rely on sheep pastoralism, absorbing Mesolithic hunter-gatherers. Rituals associated with hunting presumably came from the integration of these hunter-gatherers into the Neolithic pastoralists. These pastoralists later became almost totally separated from their villager antecedents and interacted with them only based on initial conflict and acculturation. For pastoralists such as the Kurubas, the horse became an important pack animal after the Iron Age and an animal for fighting. Nanjundaiah claimed the Kurubas were the descendants of the Pallavas. Groups of soldiers from the Kuruba community became important in the armies of Deccan powers in the Medieval era. It is believed that Kurubas are ethnically related to the Kuruvars of Sangam literature. This is also supported by the fact that Kuruvars worshiped Murukan and his Kuruvar wife, Valli whereas Kurubas worship Mailara/Mallanna, who represents Murukan, and his Kuruba wife, Kurubattyavva.

There are over 200 evidences saying that the Kurumas or Kurubas founded the Sangama dynasty, the founding dynasty of the Vijayanagara Empire. According to Ramchandra Chintaman Dhere, a scholar of the religious traditions of Maharashtra:

The history of South India shows clearly that all the southern royal dynasties who arose from pastoralist, cowherd groups gained Kshatriya status by claiming to be Moon lineage Kshatriyas, by taking Yadu as their ancestor, and by continually keeping alive their pride in being 'Yadavas'. Many dynasties in South India, from the Pallavas to the Yadavarayas, were originally members of pastoralist, cowherd groups and belonged to Kuruba lineages.

. The Holkars of Indore belong to this caste which is called as Dhangars in Maharastra.

== Subdivisions ==
They have three divisions, namely Unnikankan, Hattikankan and Hande. Those who subsist on the wool economy wear a Unnikankan (wool bracelet), while those in agriculture wear a Hattikankan (cotton bracelet). These bracelets are tied during the marriage ceremony. Hande Kurubas claims a higher position than the other two and prefers to be called Nayakas. They were an important part of the armies of Hyder Ali and Ankusagari Poligars. Nayakas were military leaders who often became Inamdars.

The priestly class of Kurubas is called Oderu Kuruba. They don't eat meat and wear the lingam, and to that extent they resemble the Lingayats' Jangamas.

In Maharashtra, they are a sub-caste of Dhangar community. Kurubas and Dhangars have the same religious ideas and practices. The Kannada speaking Dhangars of southern Maharashtra can easily be called Kurubas. They are divided into Unnikankan and Hattikankan Dhangars, which are subdivisions of Kurubas. Dhangars' priestly class is called Vadad, derived from Oderu, which is the priestly class of Kurubas. They differ from Kurubas only in name and language.

== Varna status ==
By the 1920s, some of the Kurubas had begun to call themselves Prathama Sudra ('first Sudra') or Indra Sudra ('chief Sudra'). In Karnataka, the Kurubas are classified as Other Backward Class in the Indian system of reservation. Since the community is more dispersed, the Kurubas have been called a non-dominant minority community. The Kuruba community's population in Karnataka is around fifty lakh (five million), which is 8-9% of the total 6.5 crore (65 million) population of the state.

== Current situation ==
The Kuruba community mainly inhabits the eastern parts of Karnataka. The region is mainly plateau broken up by hills, rivers and tanks. The soil in this region is mainly red soils, and red sandy loams, unsuitable for agriculture. The low hills and plains have scrub and rocky country, ideal for pastoral lifestyles.

The Kurubas traditionally practiced transhumance pastoralism: moving with large flocks of sheep from one pasture to the other. A secondary source of livelihood was once weaving kamblis, but that had mostly disappeared by the 20th century. With the disappearance of pastureland, they have been settling down to agriculture, some as landlords and other as tenants. Today, the majority of Hattikankan Kurubas practice farming and cattle-breeding, and many Unnikankan Kurubas are also farmers. But some also sell sheep and goats, as well as cow dung, in a symbiotic relationship with local farmers.

== Culture ==
Although the Kurubas are traditionally Saivites, they worship a variety of deities. Mailara, Mallanna, Mallikarjuna, Vitthal (in his original Shiva form) and Beerappa, and Arivamma [Aluvelu mangamma] who all are forms of Shiva, and Yellamma are some of the important gods of Kurubas. They consider Vitthal and Beerappa as brothers, however, Beerappa has traditionally been their exclusive deity. Other deities they worship include Batyappa, Irachikappa, Kallu Kambhadappa, Budalappa, Settipalleppa, Karakuappa and Lakshmi Devi. They worship all gramadevatas and sacrifice sheep and goats.

Previously, the Kurubas celebrated parashe where the group of Kurubas throughout a region celebrated the festival of their gods. During this time Goravas, an order of saints dedicated to Mailari Devaru, are initiated. During the parashe, the idol of the temple where the parashe takes place is washed in a river, and decorated with hoovu-vibhuti. The worship is conducted by a Kuruba pujari and the Goravas sing songs dedicated to the deity. However, these celebrations were largely gone by the 1920s. The Kurubas also worship Iragaru, men who die unmarried, by building temples and setting up stones for them. They bury their dead.
