= Geography of Piedmont =

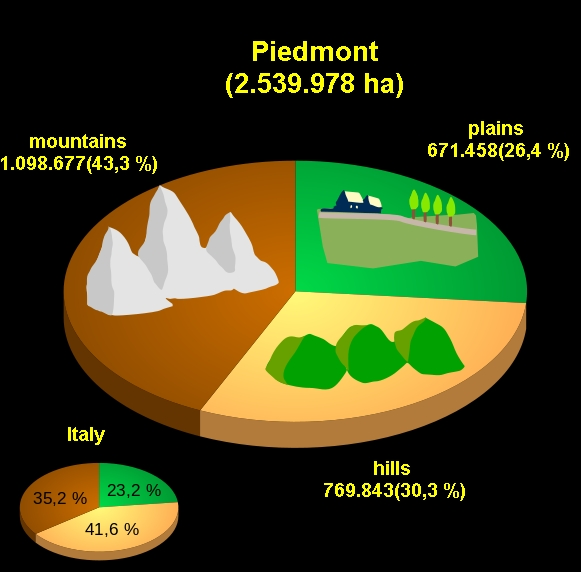

The Geography of Piedmont is that of a territory predominantly mountainous, 43.3%, but with extensive areas of hills which represent 30.3% of the territory, and of plains (26.4%).

To the north and to the west Piedmont is surrounded by the Alps, to the south by the Apennines, and to the east by the Po plain.

To the west Piedmont borders with France, to the north with Valle d'Aosta and Switzerland, to the east with Lombardy and Emilia-Romagna, and to the south with Liguria.

Piedmont is the second largest of the 20 administrative regions of Italy, after Sicily. It is broadly contiguous with the upper part of the drainage basin of the Po which rises from the slopes of Monviso in the west of the region and is Italy’s largest river. The Po collects all the waters provided within the semicircle of mountains (Alps and Apennines) which surround the region on three sides.

From the highest peaks the land slopes down to hilly areas (not always, though, sometimes there is a brusque transition from the mountains to the plains), and then to the upper, and then the lower Pianura Padana. The boundary between the first and the second is characterised by risorgive, springs typical of the pianura padana which supply fresh water both to the rivers and to a dense network of irrigation canals.

Lago Maggiore and the line of the rivers Ticino and Sesia separate Piedmont from Lombardy.

The countryside, then, is very varied: one passes from the rugged peaks of the massifs of Monte Rosa and of Gran Paradiso (national park), to the damp rice paddies of the Vercellese and Novarese; from the gentle hillsides of the Langhe and of Monferrato to the plains, often polluted and studded with a mixture of farms and industrial concerns.

== Orography ==
=== Mountains ===
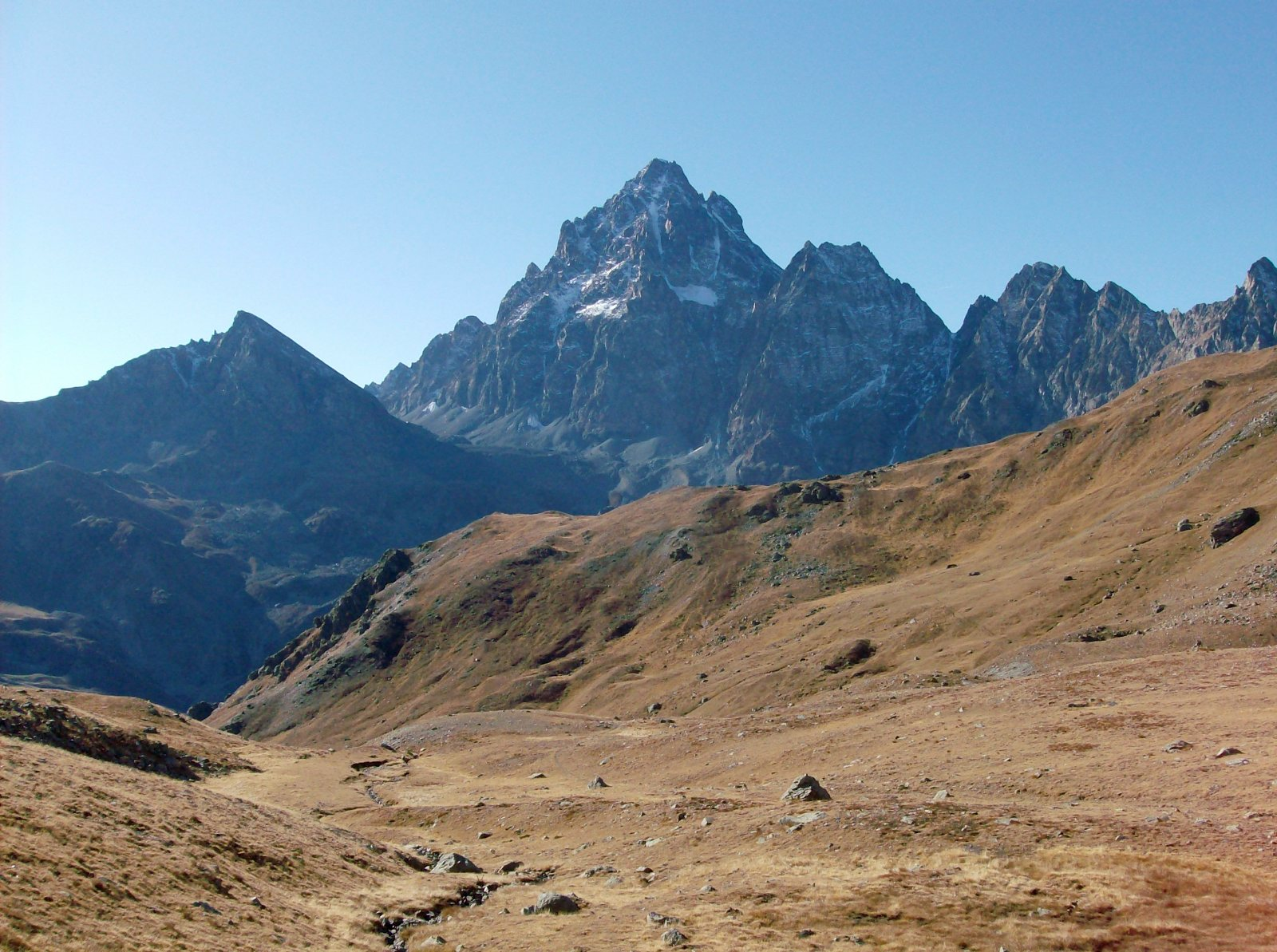
Monviso, an emblematic mountain of Piedmont

Principal mountains:

- Monte Rosa 4634 m
- Gran Paradiso 4061 m
- Monviso 3841 m
- Uia di Ciamarella 3676 m
- Monte Leone 3552 m
- Rocciamelone 3538 m
- Pierre Menue 3505 m
- Corno Bianco 3320 m
- Punta Ramiere 3303 m
- Bric Bouchet 3216 m
- Monte Matto 3097 m
- Monte Albergian 3041 m
- Rocca la Meia 2831 m
- Monte Giavino 2766 m
- Punta Marguareis 2651 m
- Monte Bram 2357 m
- Monte Barone 2044 m
- Monte Antola 1597 m
- Mottarone 1492 m
- Monte Musinè 1150 m

=== Valleys ===
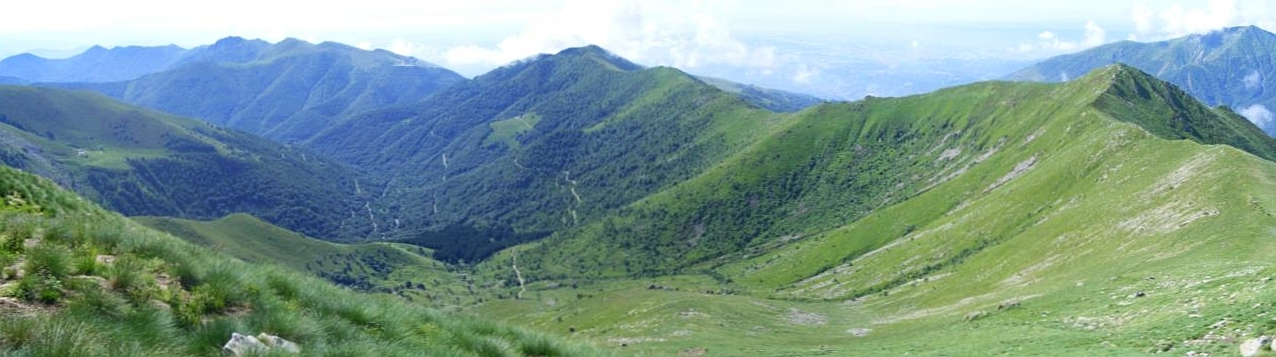
Valsessera from Cima delle Guardie

As Piedmont is bounded to the north and to the west by the Alps, and to the south by the Apennines it is rich in valleys of very varied dimensions. There follows a list of some of the valleys of the region starting at the north of the boundary with Lombardy and proceeding anti-clockwise:

- Val d'Ossola
  - Valle Anzasca
  - Valle Antrona
  - Val Bognanco
  - Val Divedro
  - Valle Antigorio
  - Val Formazza
  - Val Vigezzo
- Valsesia
  - Val Mastallone
  - Val d'Otro
  - Val Vogna
- Val Sessera
- Valle Strona di Mosso
- Valle Cervo
- Valchiusella
- Valle dell'Orco
- Valli di Lanzo
  - Val grande di Lanzo
  - Val d'Ala
  - Valle di Viù
- Val Ceronda
- Val di Susa
- Val Sangone
- Val Chisone
  - Val Germanasca
- Val Pellice
- Valle Po
- Valle Maira
- Val Varaita
- Valle Stura di Demonte
- Valle Gesso
- Val Bormida
- Val Curone
- Valle Scrivia
- Val Borbera

== Hydrography ==
=== Rivers ===
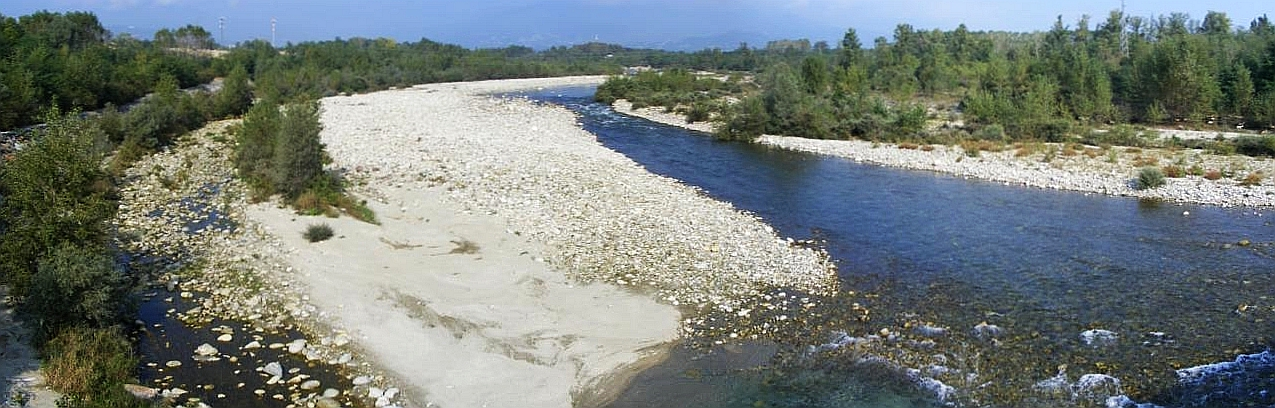
The Orco near Rivarolo - October 2009

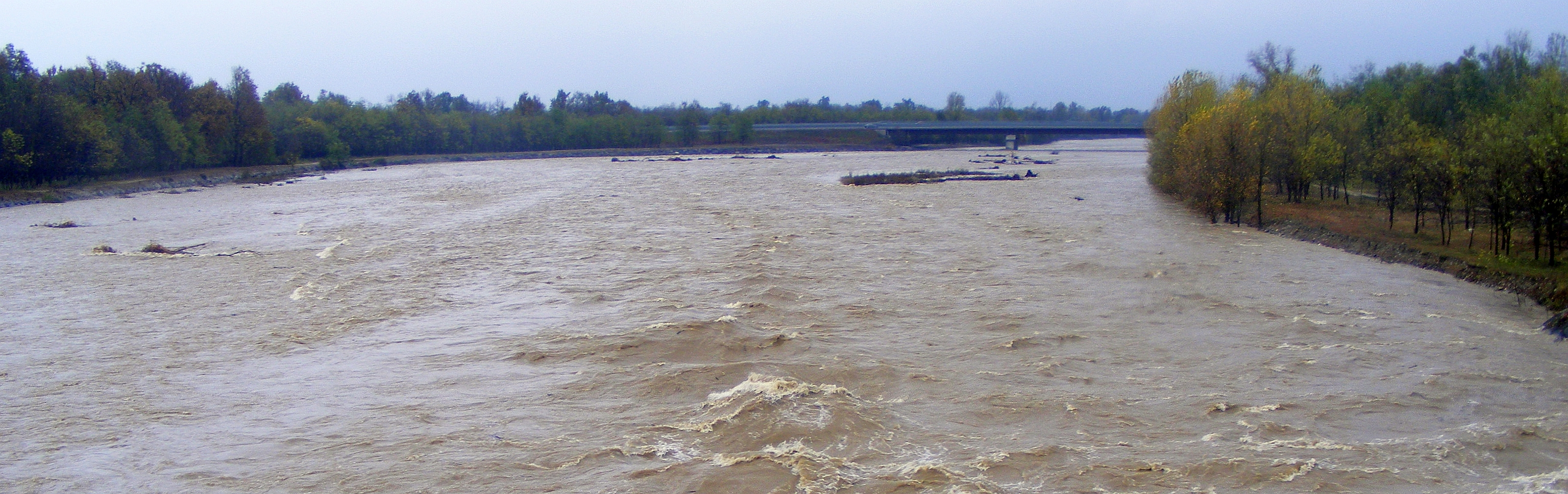
The same river near Foglizzo - November 2011

The largest river in Piedmont is the Po. Other important rivers, in order of their mean rate of discharge, include:

Name	Length	Mean discharge
Ticino	280 km	350 m^{3}/s
Tanaro	276 km	123 m^{3}/s
Dora Baltea	160 km	110 m^{3}/s
Sesia	138 km	70 m^{3}/s
Toce	84 km	69.9 m^{3}/s
Stura di Demonte	111 km	47 m^{3}/s
Bormida	154 km	40 m^{3}/s
Orco	100 km	28 m^{3}/s
Stura di Lanzo	68.8 km	26.1 m^{3}/s
Dora Riparia	125 km	25 m^{3}/s
Cervo	65 km	21.9 m^{3}/s
Pellice	53 km	21.3 m^{3}/s
Agogna	140 km	16 m^{3}/s
Bormida di Spigno	80 km	9 m^{3}/s
Malone	40 km	8.8 m^{3}/s
Sessera	35 km	7.5m³/s
Soana	24 km	7.1 m^{3}/s
Belbo	86 km	6m³/s
Sangone	47 km	3.9m³/s

=== Lakes ===
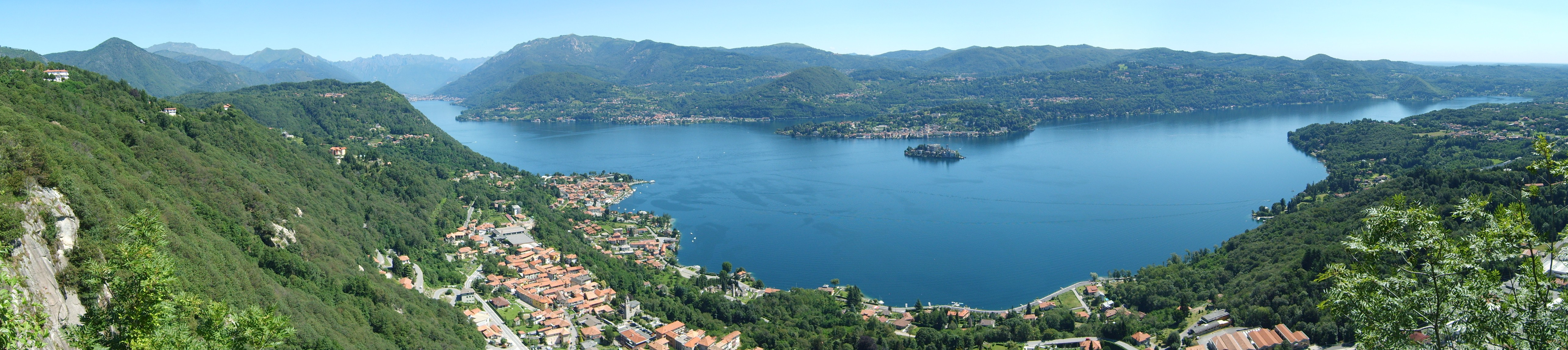
Lake Orta from Madonna del Sasso

The principal lakes of Piedmont are:

- Lago Maggiore 212 km^{2}
- Lago d'Orta 18.2 km^{2}
- Lago di Viverone 5.8 km^{2}
- Lago di Mergozzo 1.85 km^{2}
- Lago di Candia 1.52 km^{2}
- The five lakes of the Serra di Ivrea
  - Lake Sirio 1.4 km^{2}
  - Lake San Michele
  - Lake Nero
  - Lake Pistono
  - Lake Campagna
