= Soana =

Soana may refer to

- Sovana, a town in Tuscany
- Soana (stream) a torrent in Piedmont, Italy
