= Lake Campagna =

Lake of Piedmont, Northern Italy

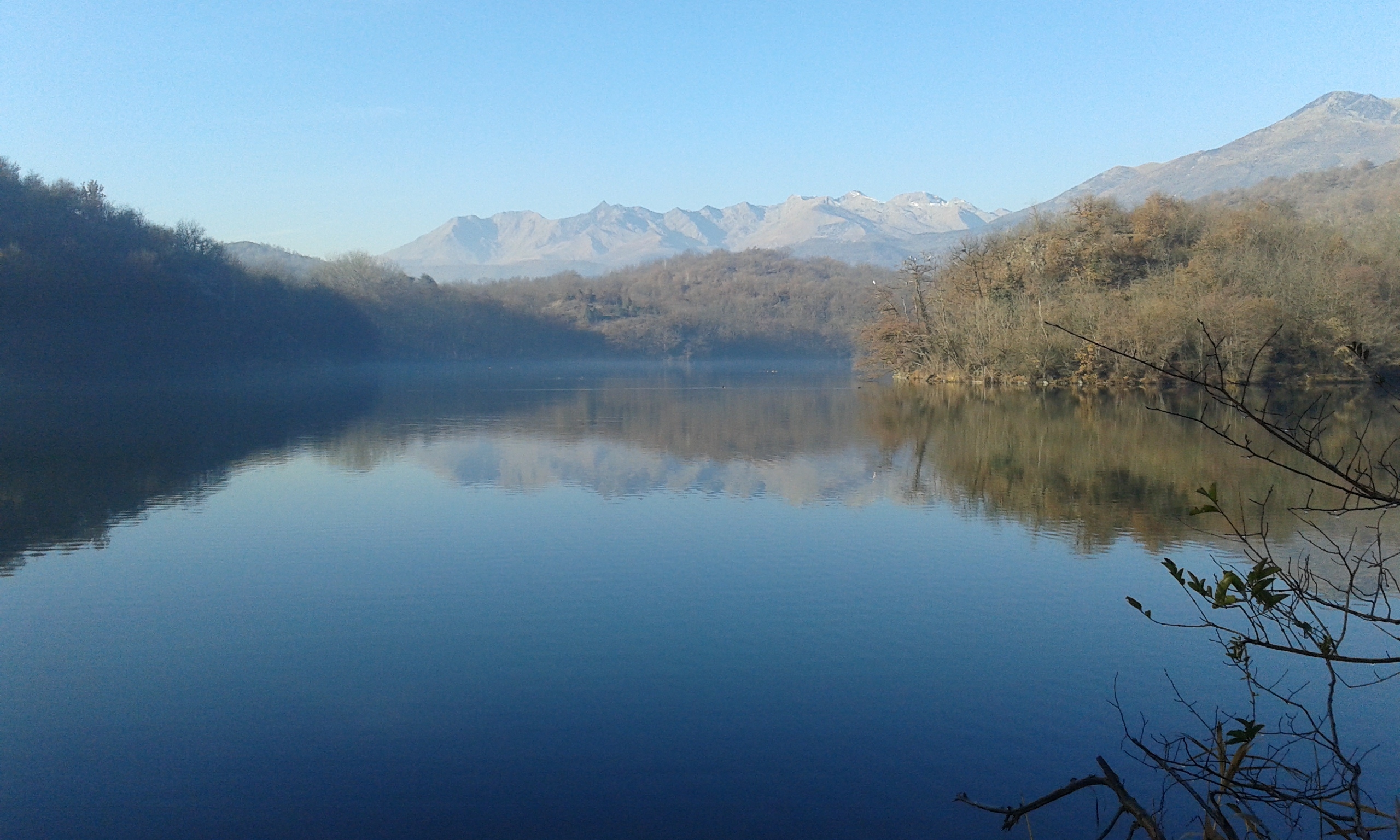
- Lake Campagna in 2015

- Location within Piedmont
- Location: Metropolitan City of Turin, Piedmont
- Coordinates: 45°29′3.50″N 7°53′56.58″E
- Catchment area: 4.1 km^{2} (1.6 sq mi)
- Basin countries: Italy
- Max. length: 0.62 km (0.39 mi)
- Max. width: 0.33 km (0.21 mi)
- Surface area: 0.109 km^{2} (0.042 sq mi)
- Max. depth: 5 m (16 ft)
- Surface elevation: 238 m (781 ft)

Lake Campagna (Italian: Lago Campagna), also known as Lake Cascinette (Italian: Lago di Cascinette), is a lake located in Piedmont, Italy.

== Description ==
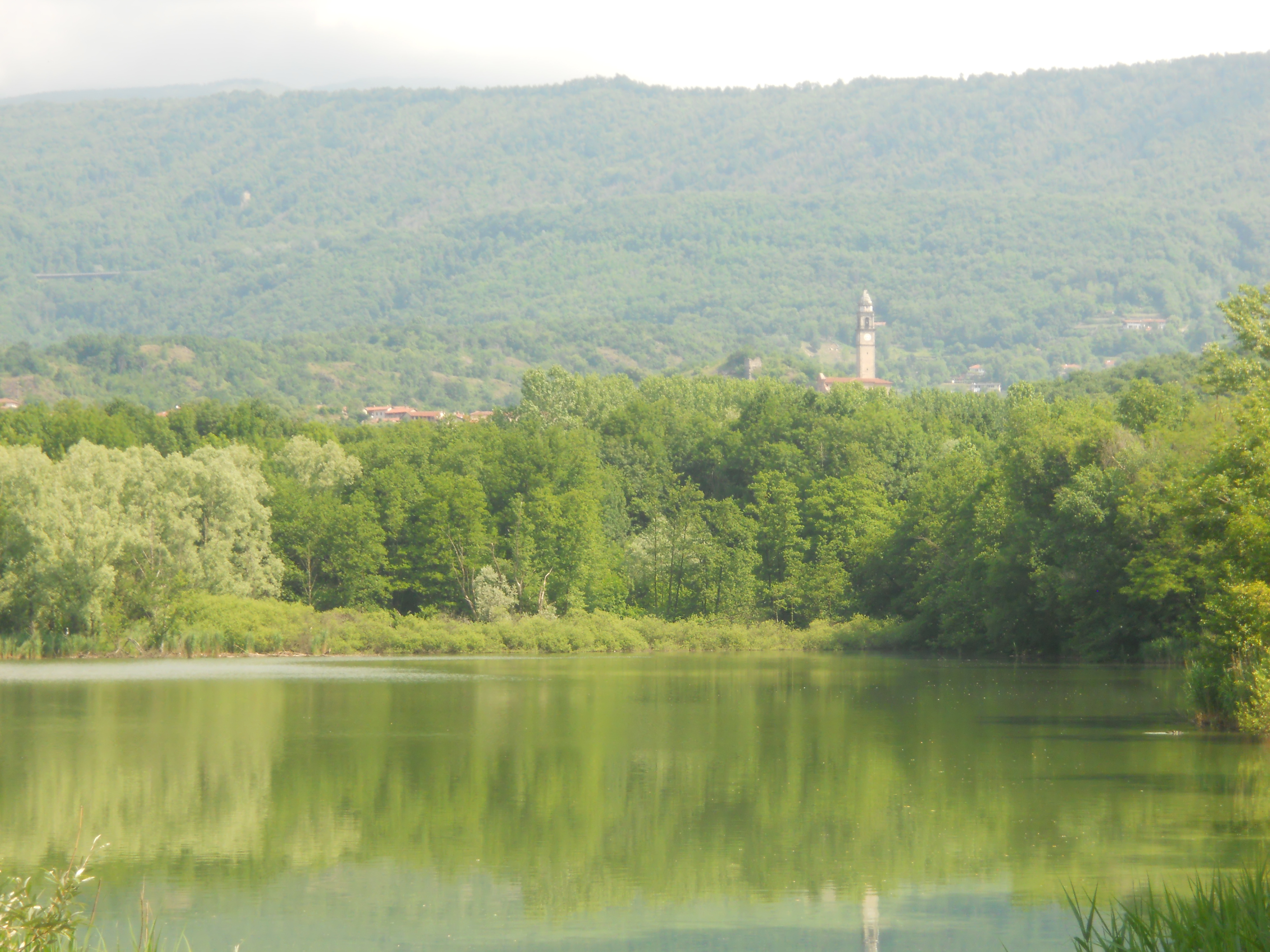
Lake Campagna with the belltower of the Church of San Silvestro in the background

The lake, which is shared by the comuni of Cascinette d'Ivrea and Chiaverano, has a water surface area of 0.109 km², a basin area of 4.1 km², and is located at an altitude of 238 meters above sea level. It is part of a group of five lakes of glacial origin, which also include Lake Sirio, Lake Nero, Lake Pistono, and Lake San Michele.

The entire lake is surrounded by a trail.

== Nature protection ==
The lake is part of the Site of Community Importance known as Laghi di Ivrea (code IT1110021), established under Directive 92/43/EEC (Habitats Directive) and designated as a Special Area of Conservation.
