= Società Canottieri Sirio =

Country club in Ivrea, Italy

The Società Canottieri Sirio is a lakeside country club located on the shores of Lake Sirio in Ivrea, Piedmont, Italy. Founded in 1887 by local rowing enthusiasts, the club gradually developed into a private sports and leisure club.

== History ==
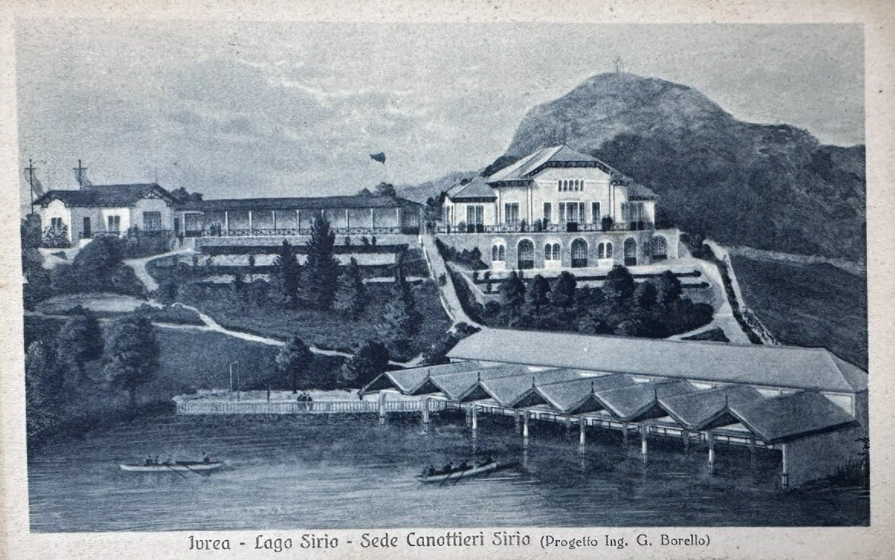
The Società Canottieri Sirio in the early 1930s

The club was established in 1887, when several residents of nearby Ivrea, passionate about rowing and keen to have a base by Lake Sirio to store their boats, rented a small house, later known as the Chalet, connected to the lakeshore by a short path. Within just four years, Canottieri Sirio had grown enough to become a legally recognized association. It went on to purchase the building it was housed by on 26 May 1911.

Over the following years, the club's popularity steadily increased, and its growing membership allowed it to expand both its facilities and its range of services. A restaurant with a full kitchen was opened for members, and a boathouse was built to accommodate an increasing number of boats. An elegant ballroom, built between 1928 and 1929, further enhanced the club's social life. By 1930, membership had surpassed 600, a notable figure given the size of Ivrea's population, from which most members were drawn.

After the Second World War, the club continued to grow, further enhancing its outdoor amenities. Activities expanded beyond rowing to include general recreation and swimming. A second lakeside building, the Casetta Jona, along with changing cabins, was added. Special care was also devoted to landscaped green spaces, where parking areas and facilities for tennis, five-a-side football, bocce, beach volleyball, basketball, and padel were developed.

== Description ==
The club features an Art Nouveau style building that houses its administrative offices and restaurant, complete with a spacious terrace overlooking the lake. The boathouse is distinguished by its finely wrought iron gates and fence, and by its decorative trim.

== Gallery ==
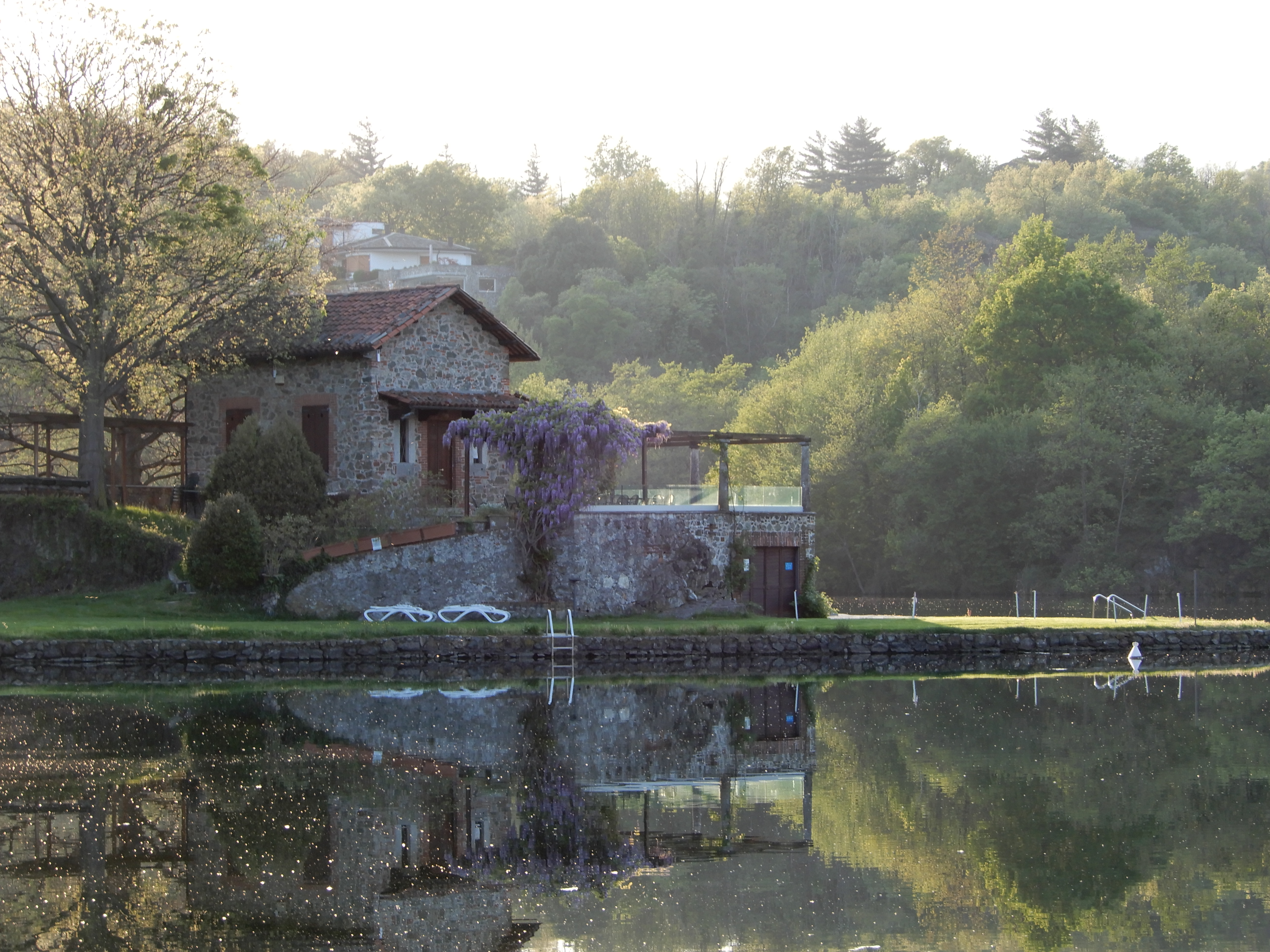

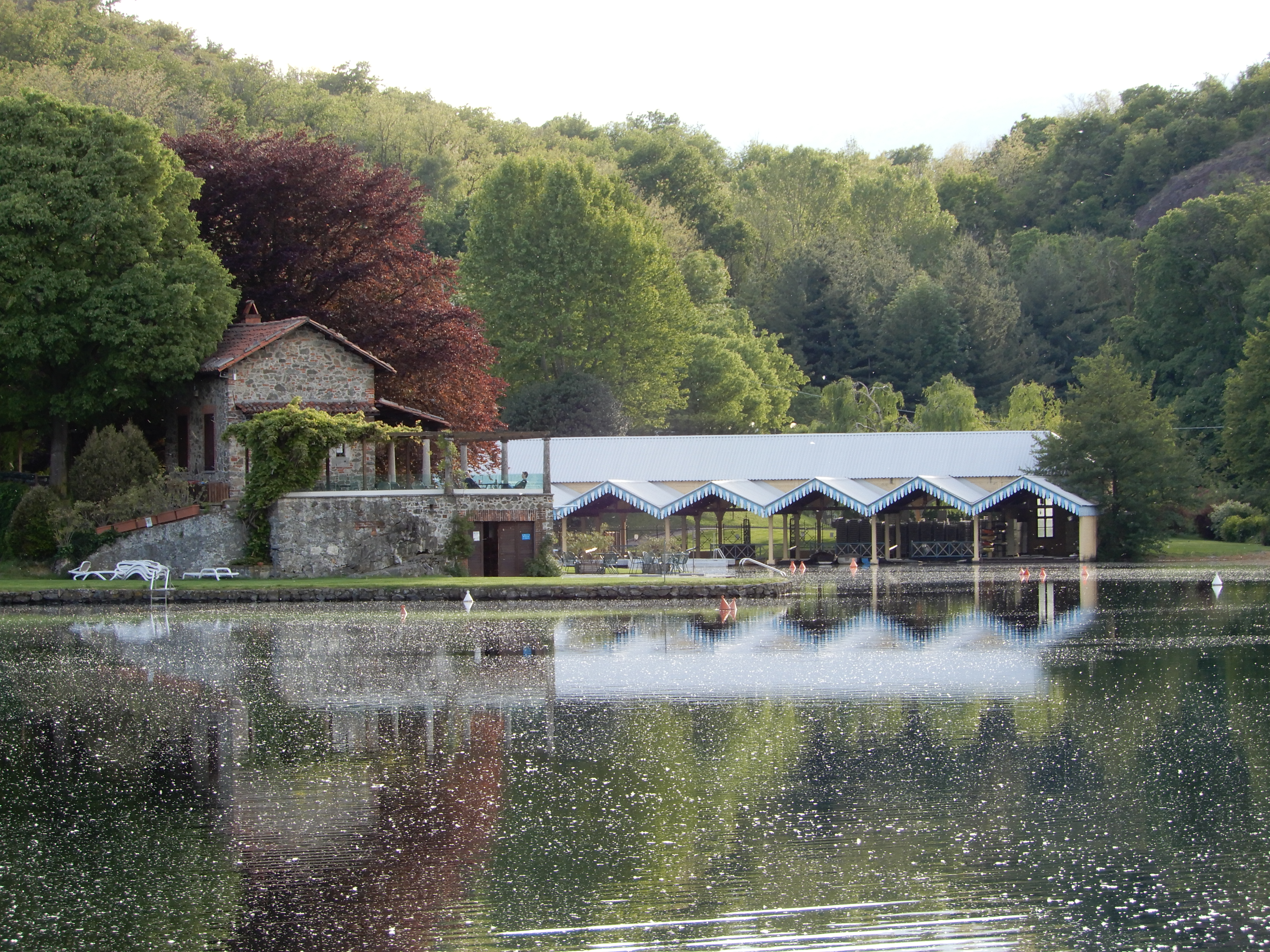

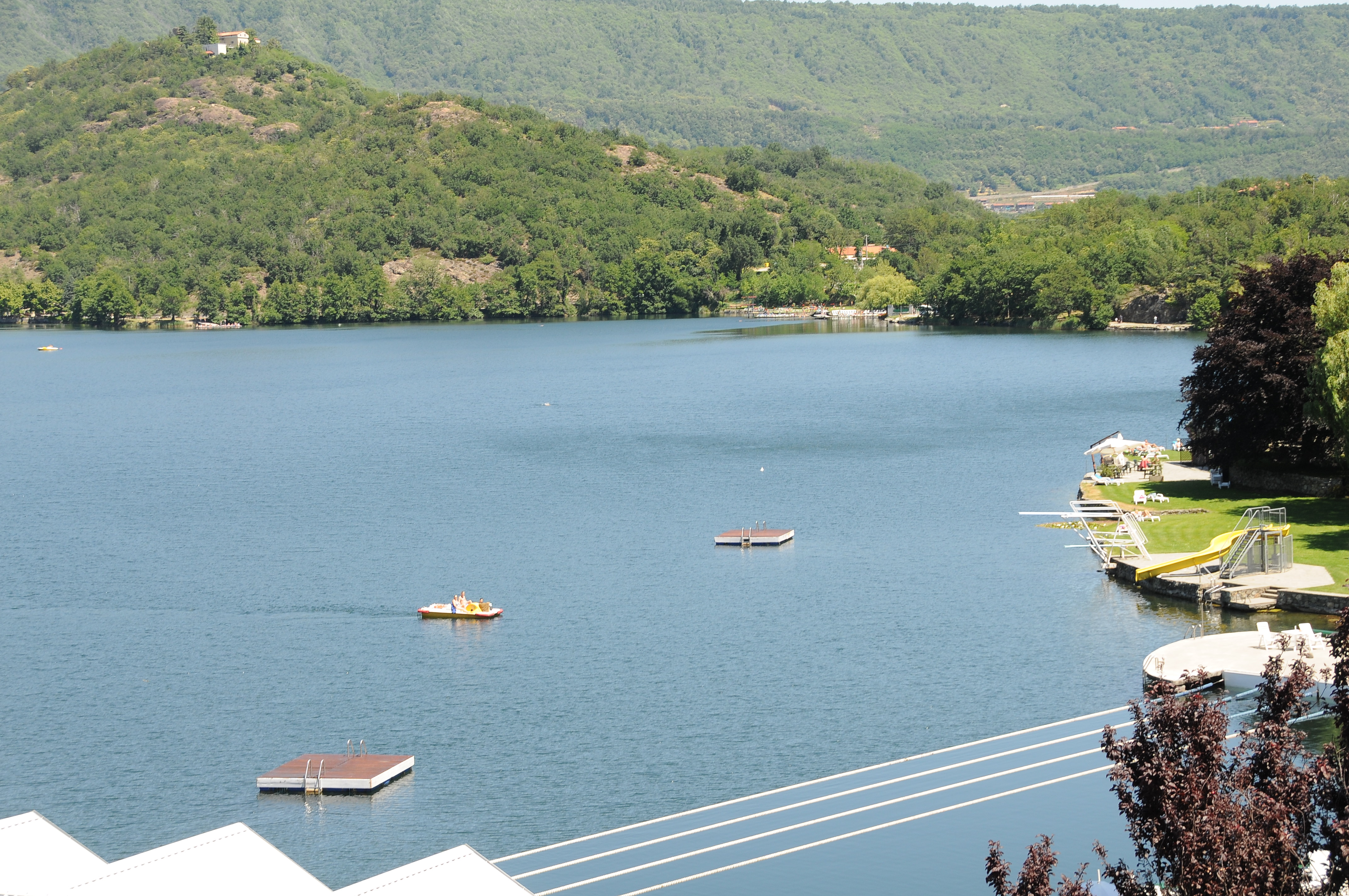
