= Montalto Dora =

- Comune
- Comune di Montalto Dora
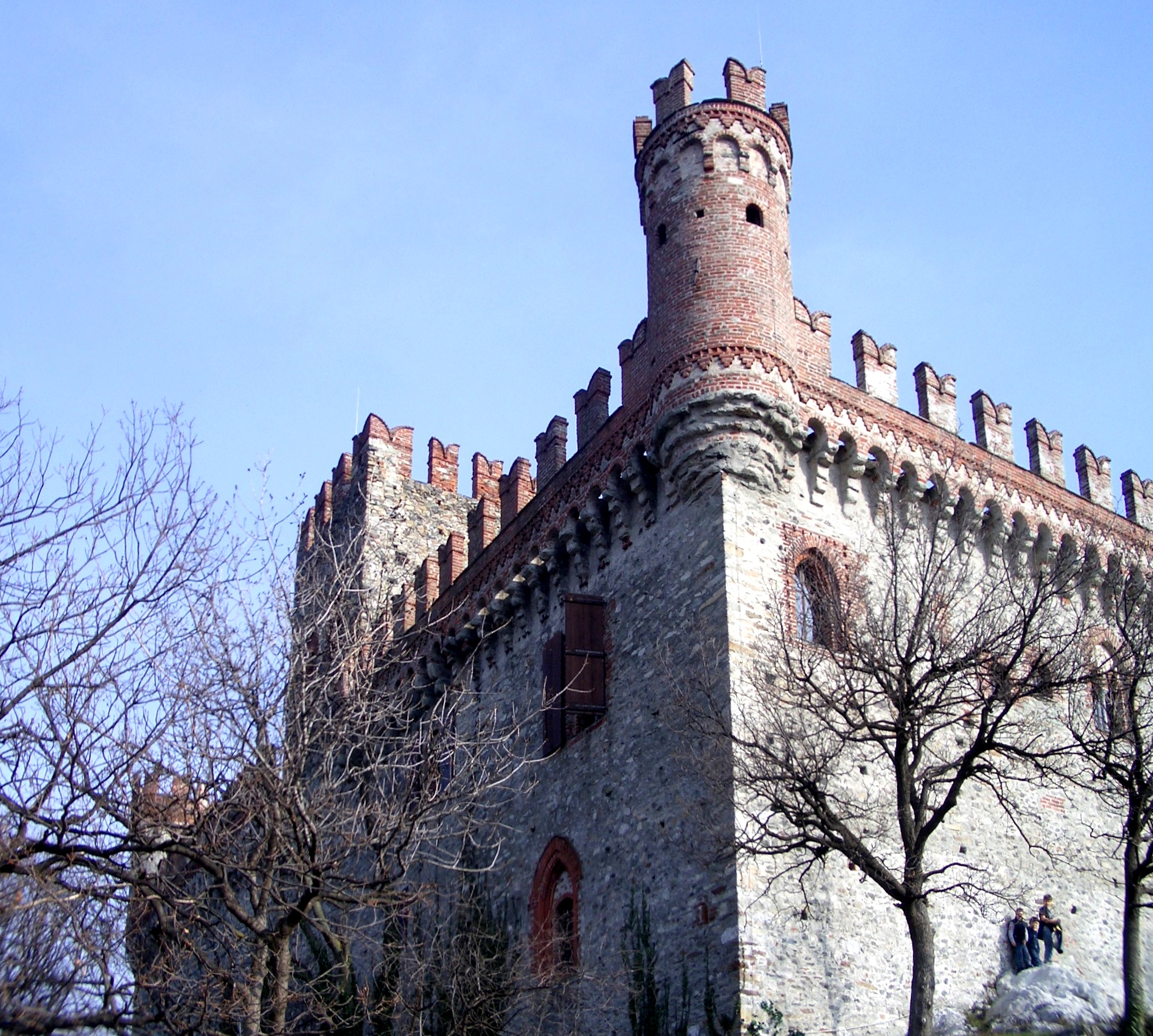
- The castle of Montalto

- Coat of arms

- Location within Italy Location within Piedmont
- Coordinates: 45°29′N 7°52′E
- Country: Italy
- Region: Piedmont
- Metropolitan city: Turin (TO)

Government
  - Mayor: Renzo Galletto

Area
  - Total: 7.5 km^{2} (2.9 sq mi)
- Elevation: 252 m (827 ft)

Population (31 December 2012)
  - Total: 3,439
  - Density: 460/km^{2} (1,200/sq mi)
- Demonym: Montaltesi
- Time zone: UTC+1 (CET)
  - Summer (DST): UTC+2 (CEST)
- Postal code: 10016
- Dialing code: 0125
- Website: Official website

Montalto Dora is a comune (municipality) in the Metropolitan City of Turin in the Italian region Piedmont, located about 50 kilometres (31 mi) northeast of Turin.

== Main sights ==
- Montalto Dora Castle, known from the mid-12th century but rebuilt in the 18th-20th centuries. It has a massive mastio and a chapel with 15th-century frescoes. The castle was owned by the bishopric of Ivrea, from which it went to the Duchy of Savoy in the 14th century.
- Parish church of Sant'Eusebio
- Church of San Rocco (c. early 16th century), with Mannerist frescoes inside
- Villa Casana, dating to the late 16th century but enlarged around 1918.
- Lake Pistono and Lake Nero, two lakes of glacial origin.

== Twin towns ==
- Cannara, Italy
