= Lake Sirio =

Lake of Piedmont, Northern Italy

- Lago Sirio (Italian)
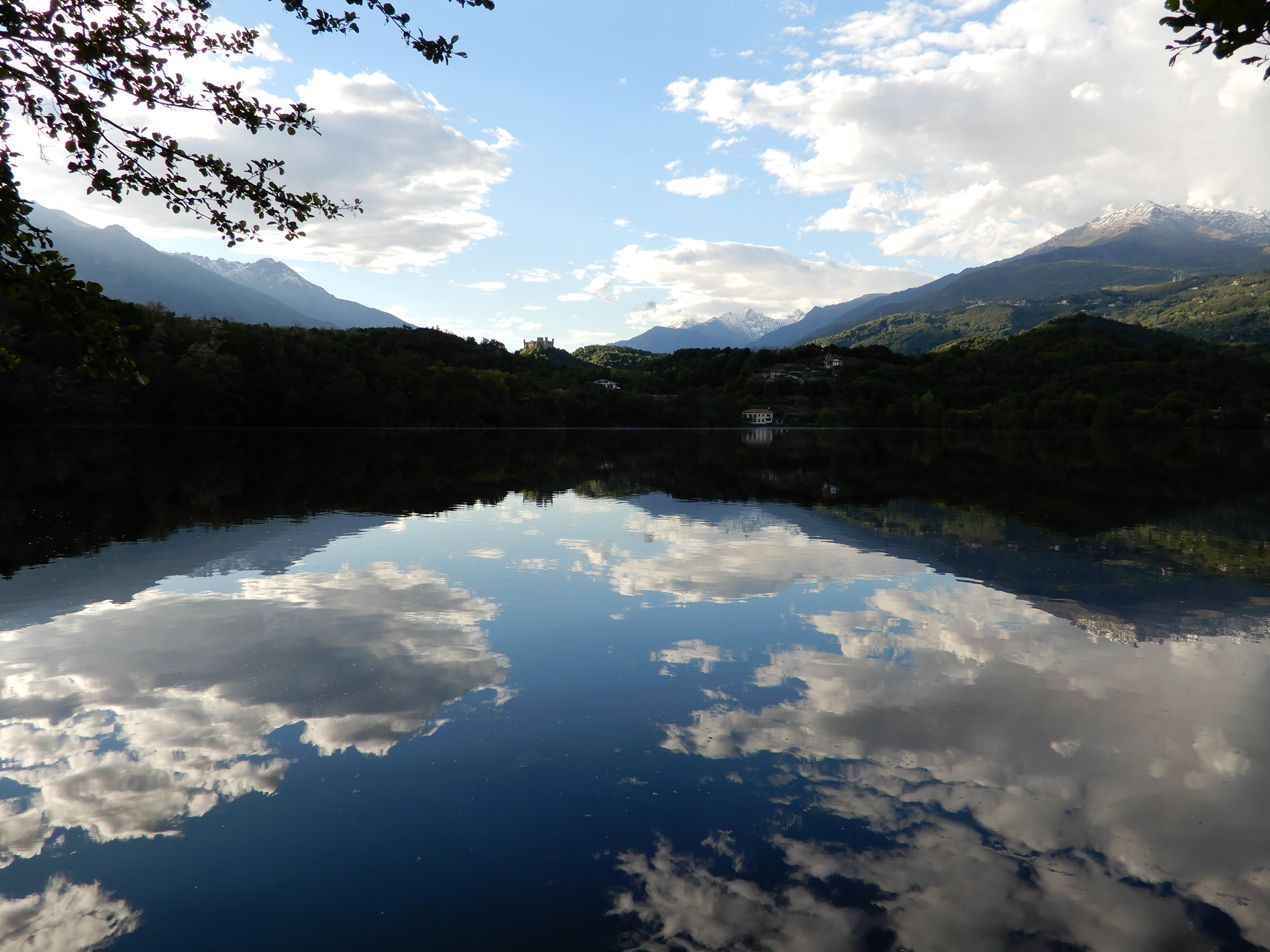
- Lake Sirio in 2016

- Location within Piedmont
- Location: Metropolitan City of Turin, Piedmont
- Coordinates: 45°29′13″N 7°53′02″E
- Primary inflows: underwater springs
- Catchment area: 1.4 km^{2} (0.54 sq mi)
- Basin countries: Italy
- Max. length: 0.9 km (0.56 mi)
- Max. width: 0.45 km (0.28 mi)
- Surface area: 0.29 km^{2} (0.11 sq mi)
- Max. depth: 43.5 m (143 ft)
- Shore length^{1}: 3.33 km (2.07 mi)
- Surface elevation: 266 m (873 ft)
- ^{1} Shore length is not a well-defined measure.

Lake Sirio (Italian: Lago Sirio) is a lake in northern Italy.

== Description ==
Located between the comunes of Ivrea and Chiaverano, it is the largest of a group of five lakes of glacial origin known as Laghi di Ivrea which also includes Lake Pistono, Lake Nero, Lake Campagna, and Lake San Michele. The lake, which was formerly known as Lake San Giuseppe due to the presence of the nearby convent of the same name, is the only one that is fed by a spring.

The lake's waterfront offers views on Montalto Dora Castle and the Aosta Valley.

The historic Società Canottieri Sirio country club, founded in 1887, is located on the lake's southern shore.

== Nature protection ==
The lake is part of the Site of Community Importance known as Laghi di Ivrea (code IT1110021), established under Directive 92/43/EEC (Habitats Directive) and designated as a Special Area of Conservation.

== Gallery ==
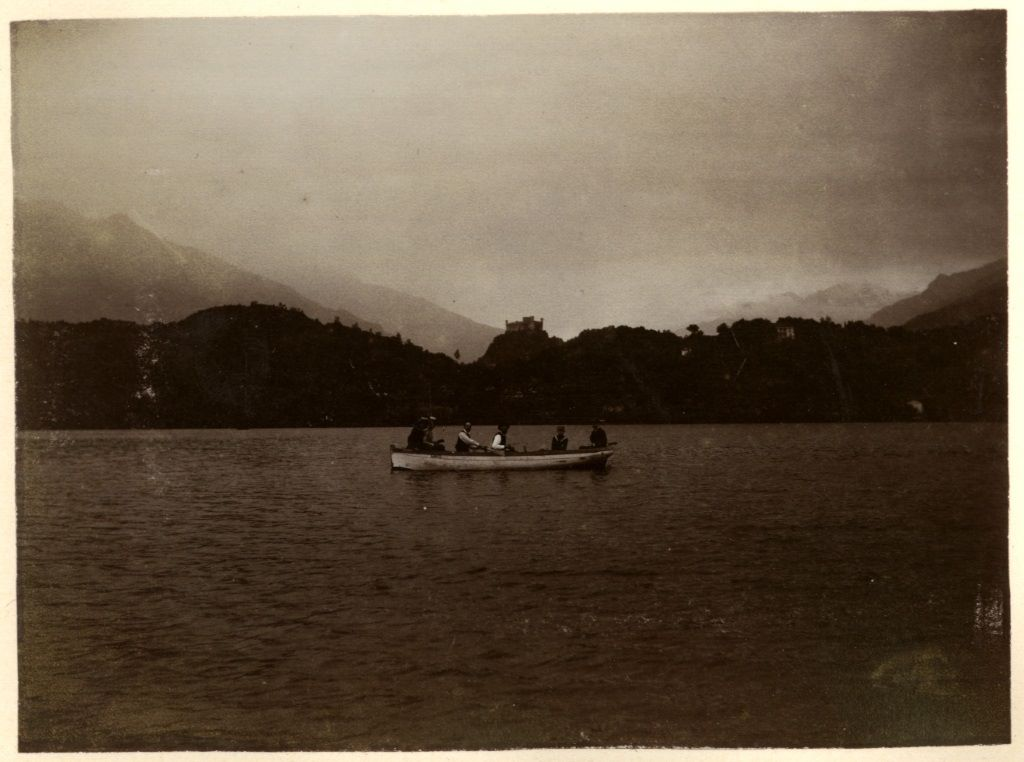

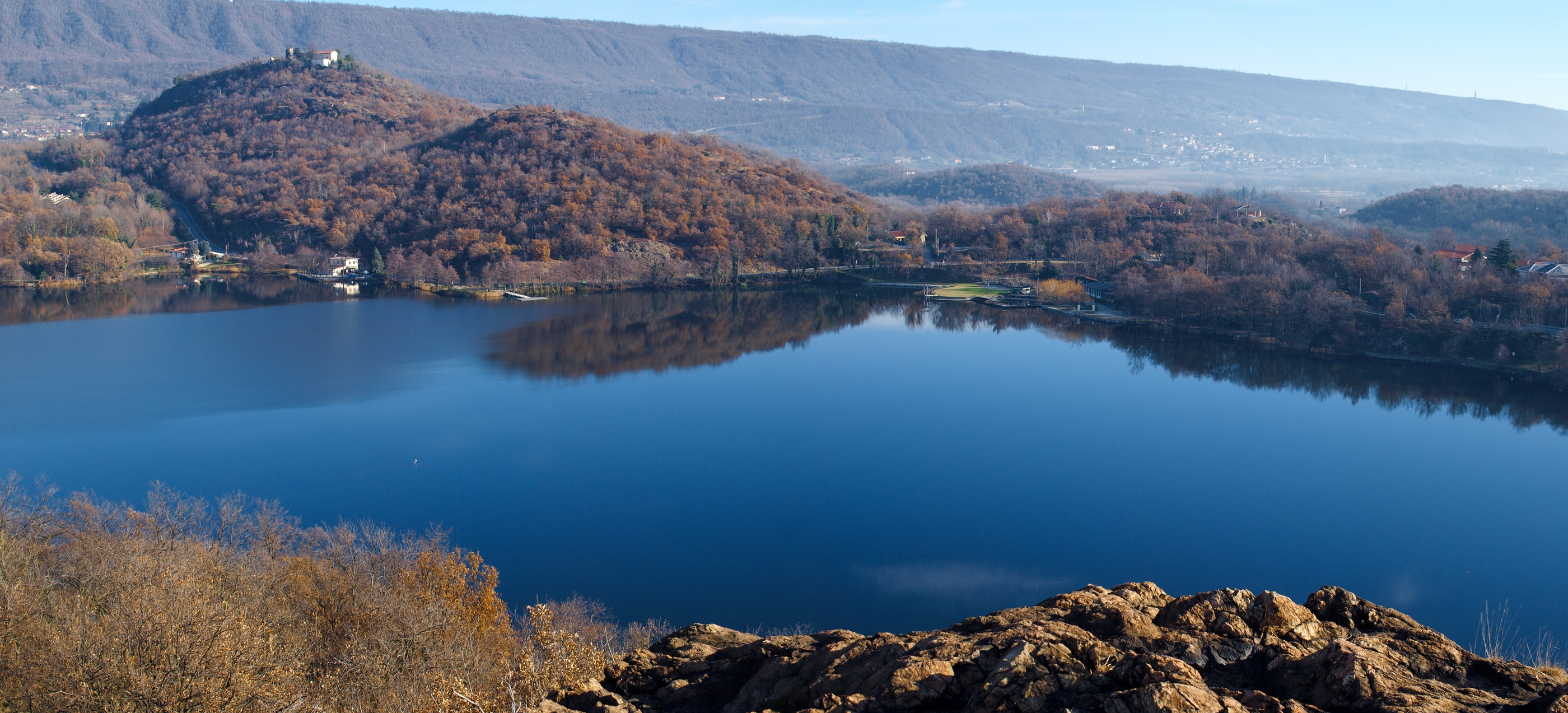

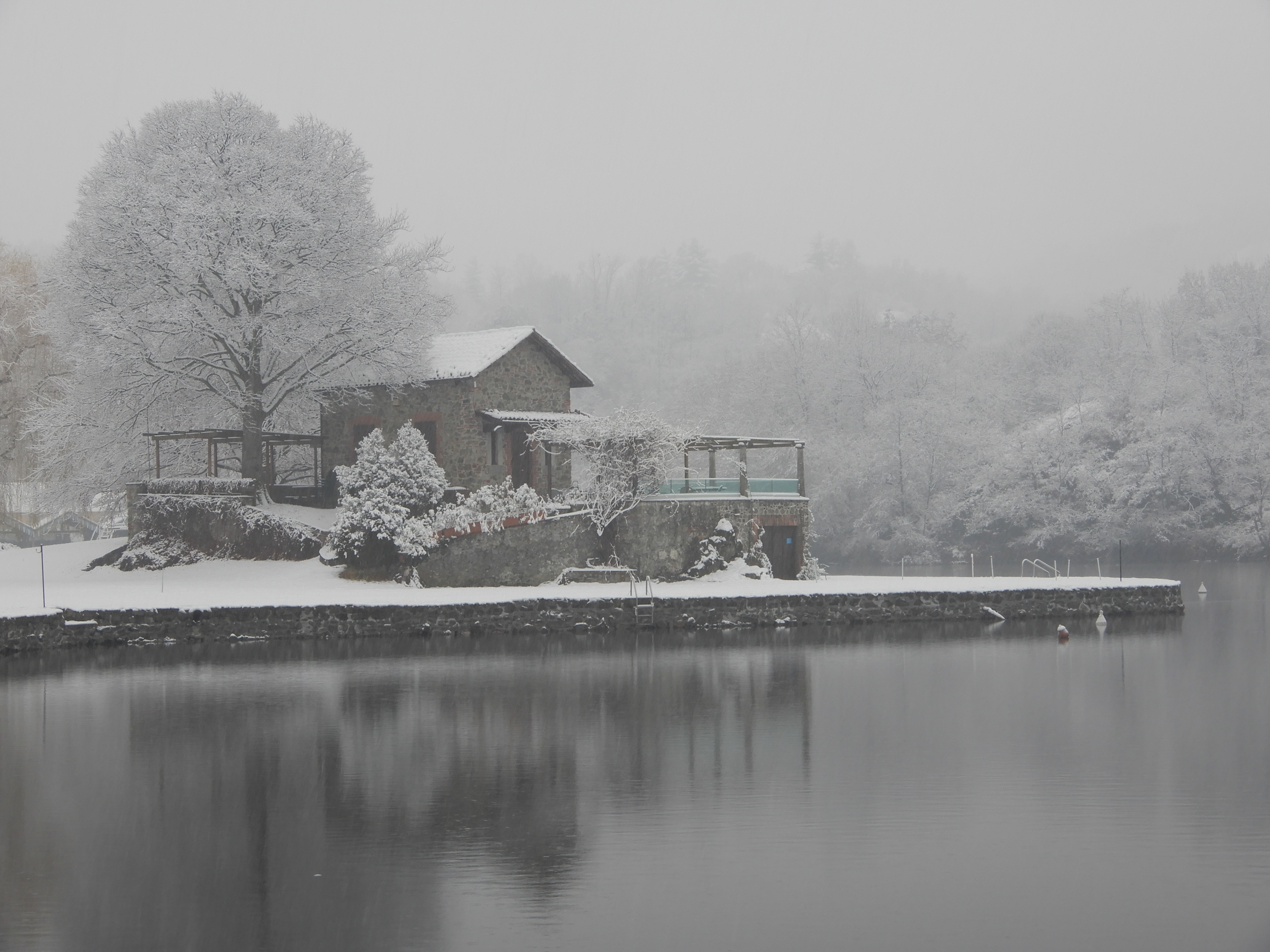
