= Lake Nero (Canavese) =

Lake of Piedmont, Northern Italy

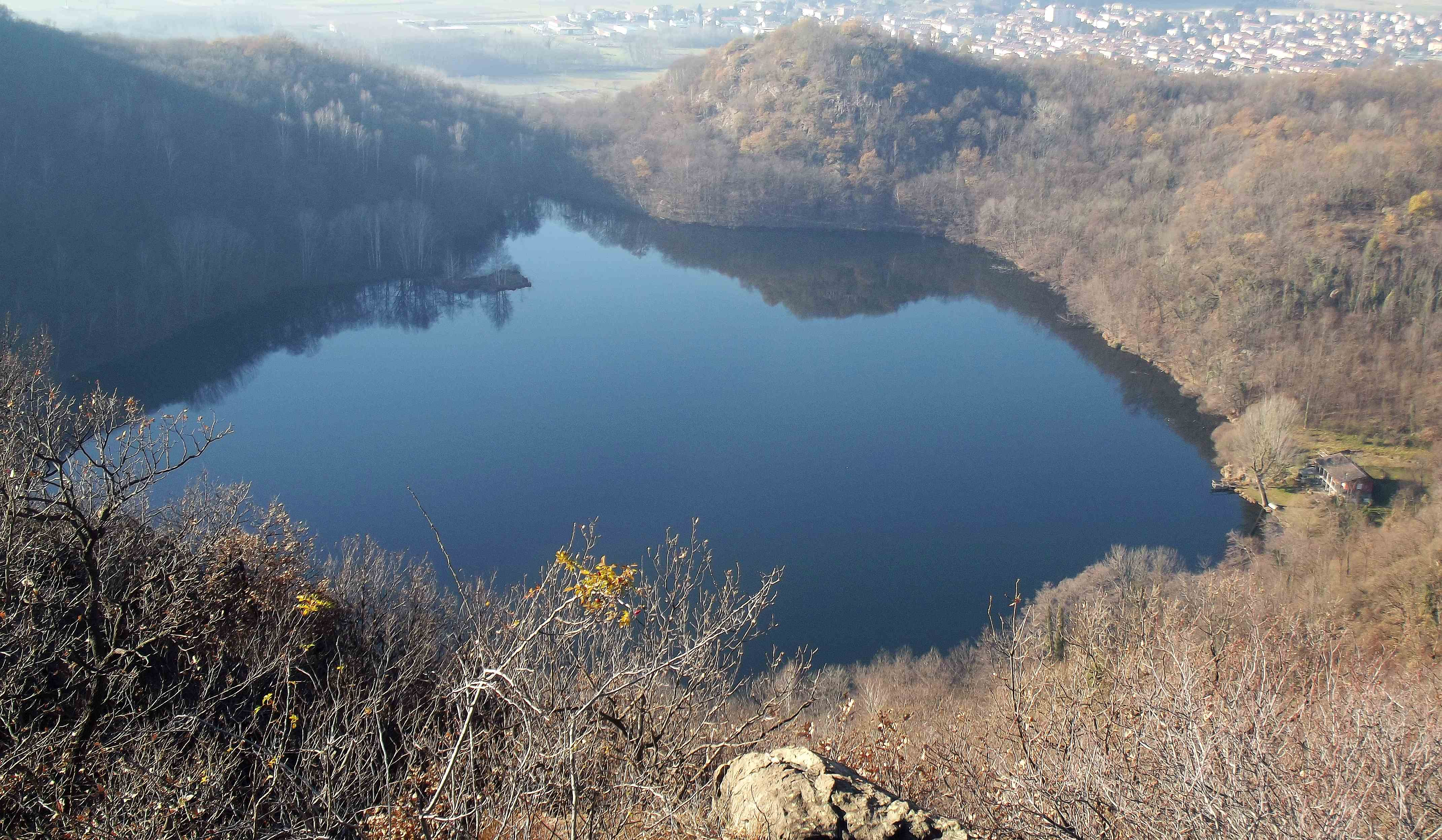
- Lake Nero in 2015

- Location within Piedmont
- Location: Metropolitan City of Turin, Piedmont
- Coordinates: 45°30′17.43″N 7°52′24″E
- Catchment area: 1.3 km^{2} (0.50 sq mi)
- Basin countries: Italy
- Max. length: 0.51 km (0.32 mi)
- Max. width: 0.31 km (0.19 mi)
- Surface area: 0.109 km^{2} (0.042 sq mi)
- Max. depth: 27 m (89 ft)
- Surface elevation: 299 m (981 ft)

Lake Nero (Italian: Lago Nero) is a lake located in Montalto Dora, Piedmont, Italy.

== Description ==
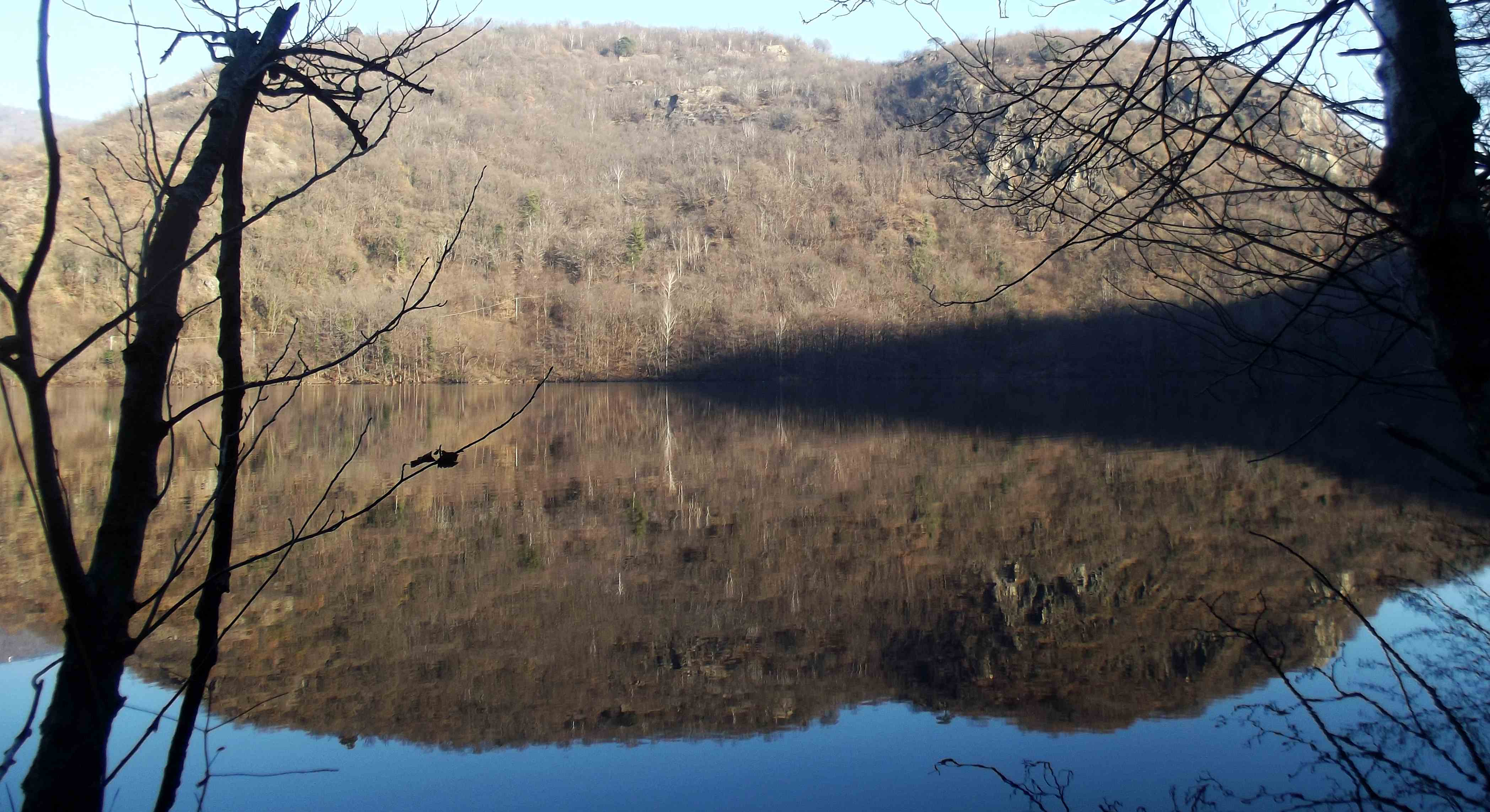
Lake Nero in the winter season

The lake, which lies in the comune of Montalto Dora, has a water surface area of 0.109 km², a basin area of 1.3 km², and is located at an altitude of 299 meters above sea level. It is part of a group of five lakes of glacial origin, which also include Lake Sirio, Lake Pistono, Lake Campagna and Lake San Michele.

The entire lake is surrounded by a trail.

== Nature protection ==
The lake is part of the Site of Community Importance known as Laghi di Ivrea (code IT1110021), established under Directive 92/43/EEC (Habitats Directive) and designated as a Special Area of Conservation.
