= Montalto Dora Castle =

Castle in Montalto Dora, Piedmont, Italy

- Castello di Montalto Dora
- Montalto Dora, Piedmont, Italy
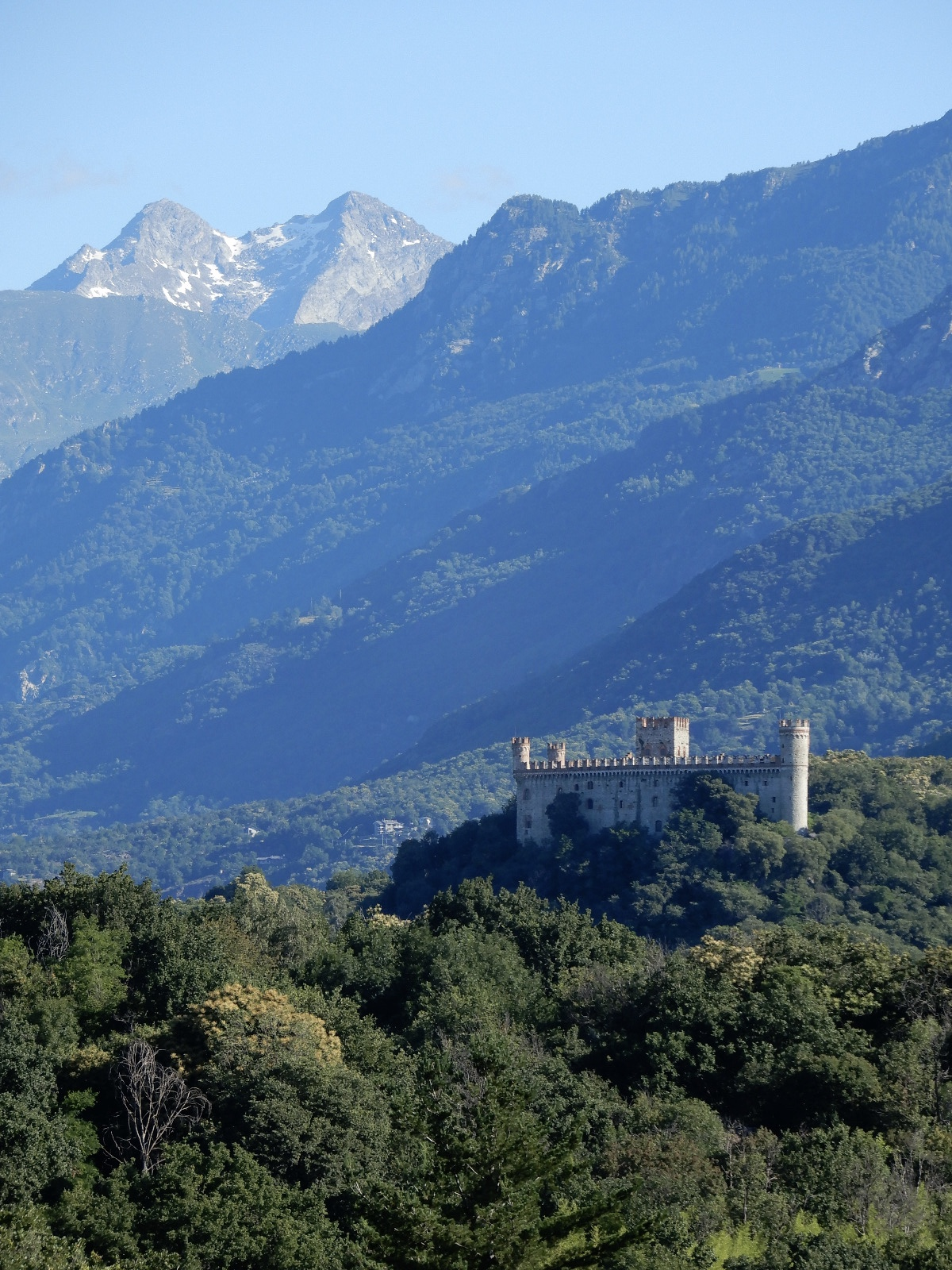
- Montalto Dora Castle

Site information
- Type: Castle

Location
- Coordinates: 45°29′52″N 7°52′15″E

Montalto Dora Castle (Italian: Castello di Montalto Dora) is a castle located in Montalto Dora, Piedmont, Italy.

== History ==
The castle dates back to between the 10th and 11th centuries. Initially, it consisted of a tower, a connecting wall, and a chapel dedicated to Saints Efisio, Mark, and Eusebius. A document from around 1141 mentions the castle under the name castrum montsalti, testifying how the fortress was under the jurisdiction of the Bishop of Ivrea. The castle’s location was of great military importance, as it allowed control over the access route to the Aosta Valley and the Via Francigena.

During the 14th and 15th century, the castle was modified and enlarged to better serve from a defensive viewpoint.

The castle endured multiple attacks throughout its history. Notably, during the siege of Ivrea in 1641 during the Piedmontese Civil War, it was assaulted by the French troops led by Marquis d'Harcourt, who were at war with the Duchy of Savoy. On that occasion, the interior of the building was dismantled but the external structures remained largely intact.

In the 19th century, the castle was renovated under the direction of architects Carlo Nigra and Alfredo d'Andrade, who also used it as a model and source of inspiration when designing the Borgo Medioevale in Turin.

The castle served as filming location for Dario Argento's 2012 film Dracula 3D.

In April 2024, it was rumored that American actor Johnny Depp was interested in acquiring the property, which was for sale.

== Description ==
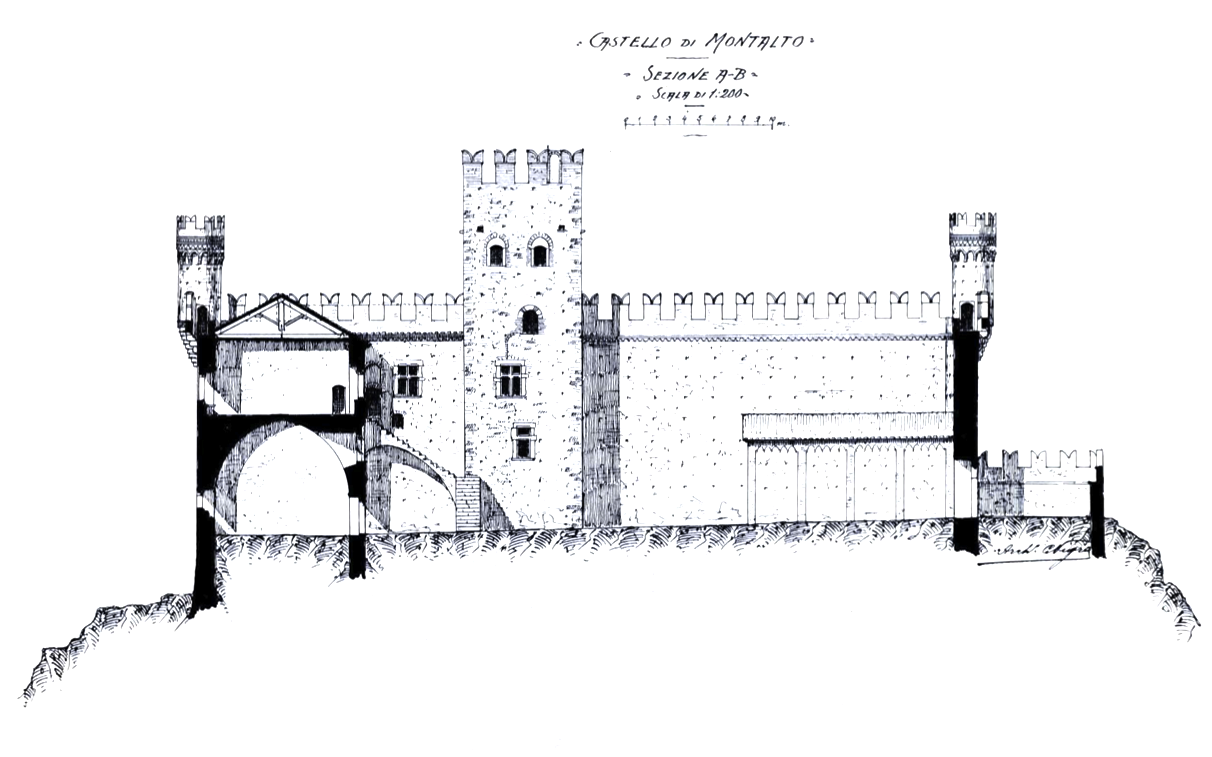
Vertical section, by Carlo Nigra

The castle is located on top of Mount Crovero and is reflected by the underlying waters of Lake Pistono. It has an irregular quadrangular layout with a double defensive wall. Only a few traces remain of the outer wall, while the inner one, approximately 14 meters high, extends for a perimeter of over 150 meters. The high crenellated walls, consisting of 142 merlons, feature a 160-meter-long patrol walkway.

The castle's square keep, which served as its main defensive stronghold, is integrated in the walls on the northern side of the structure, which is further reinforced by four round corner turrets.

In the castle courtyard, there is a low building that was presumably a guard post and a chapel dedicated to Our Lady of Grace. The chapel is a small structure, with its southern façade featuring remnants of 15th-century frescoes, including an image of Saint Christopher, attributed to Giacomino da Ivrea, and a depiction of the Madonna nursing the Child. Inside, the single-room space with a presbytery contains numerous painted fragments. On the southern wall, there is a fresco depicting female saints, including Saint Margaret, Saint Liberata with the infant saints Gervasius and Protasius, and Saint Lucy. Between these two structures stands a well that once provided water to the castle’s inhabitants.

== Gallery ==
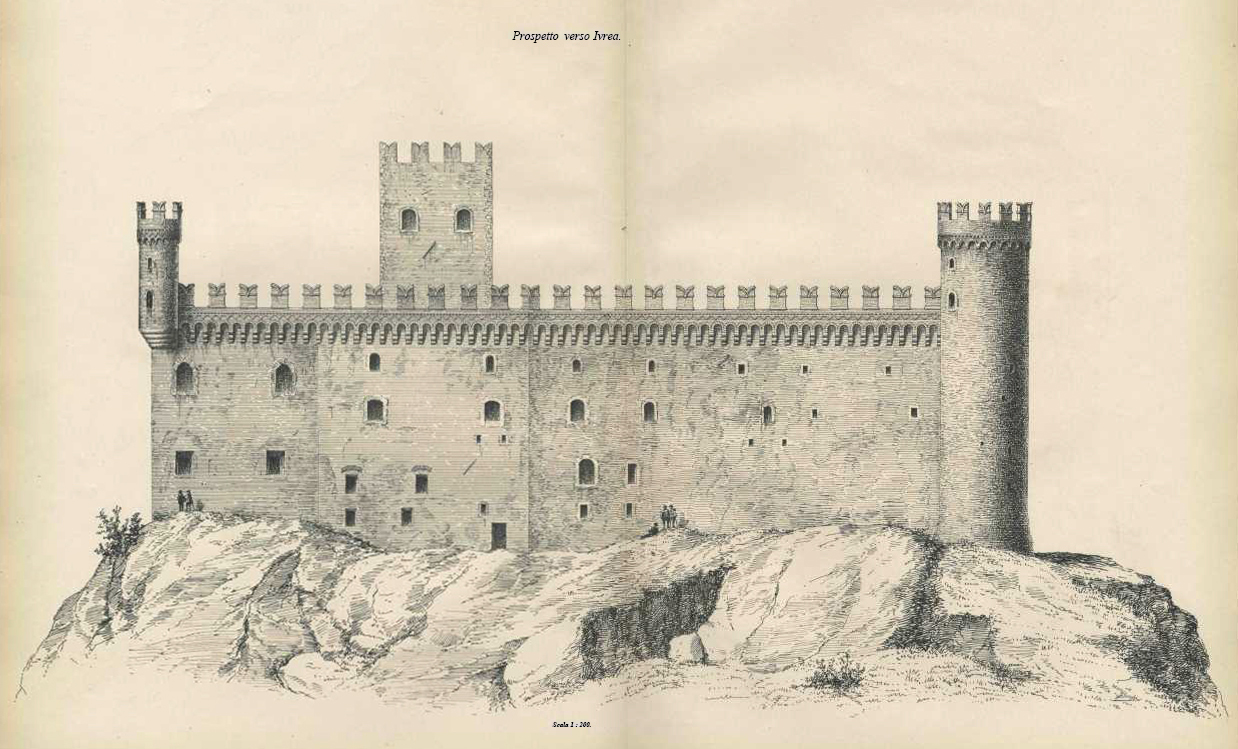

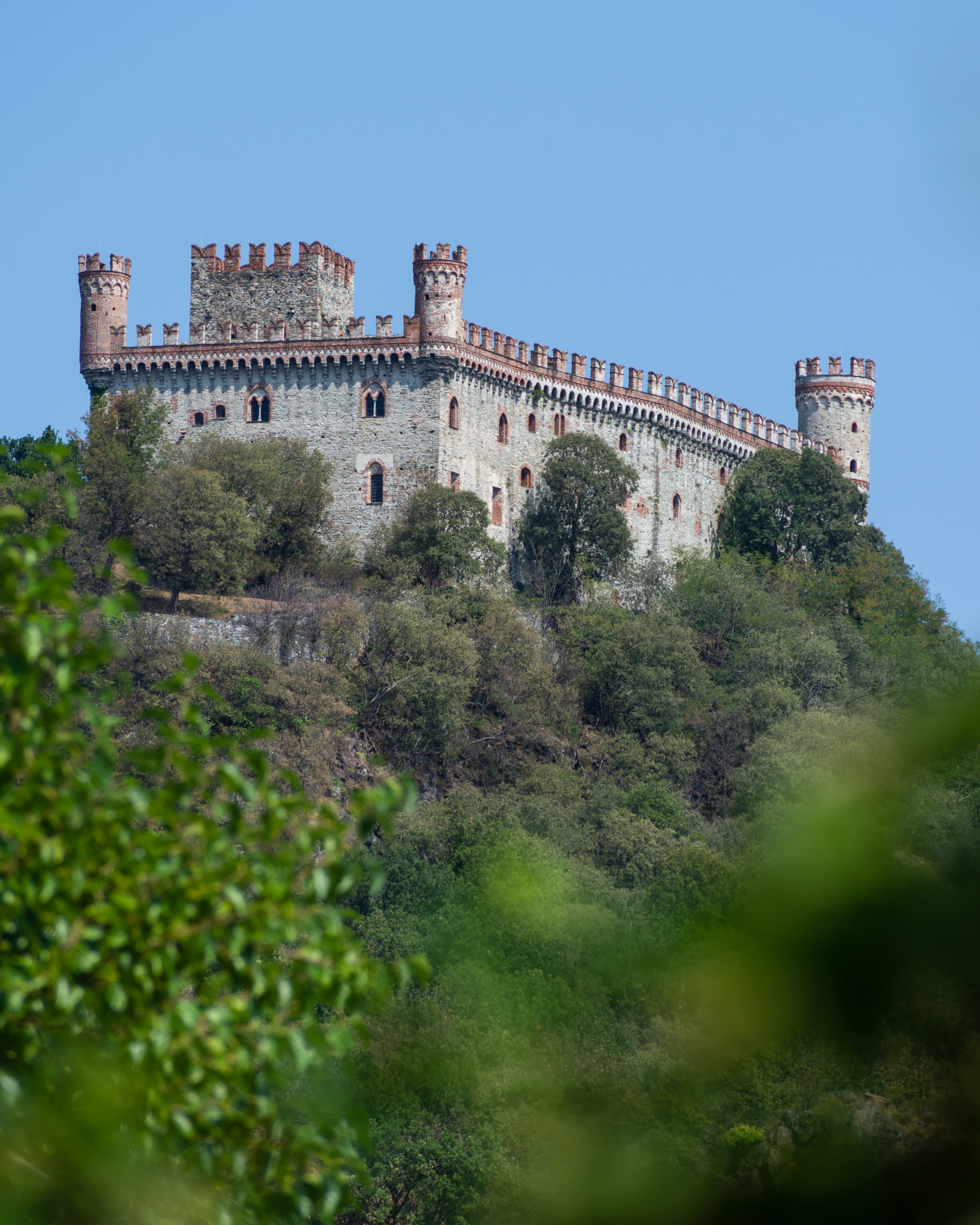

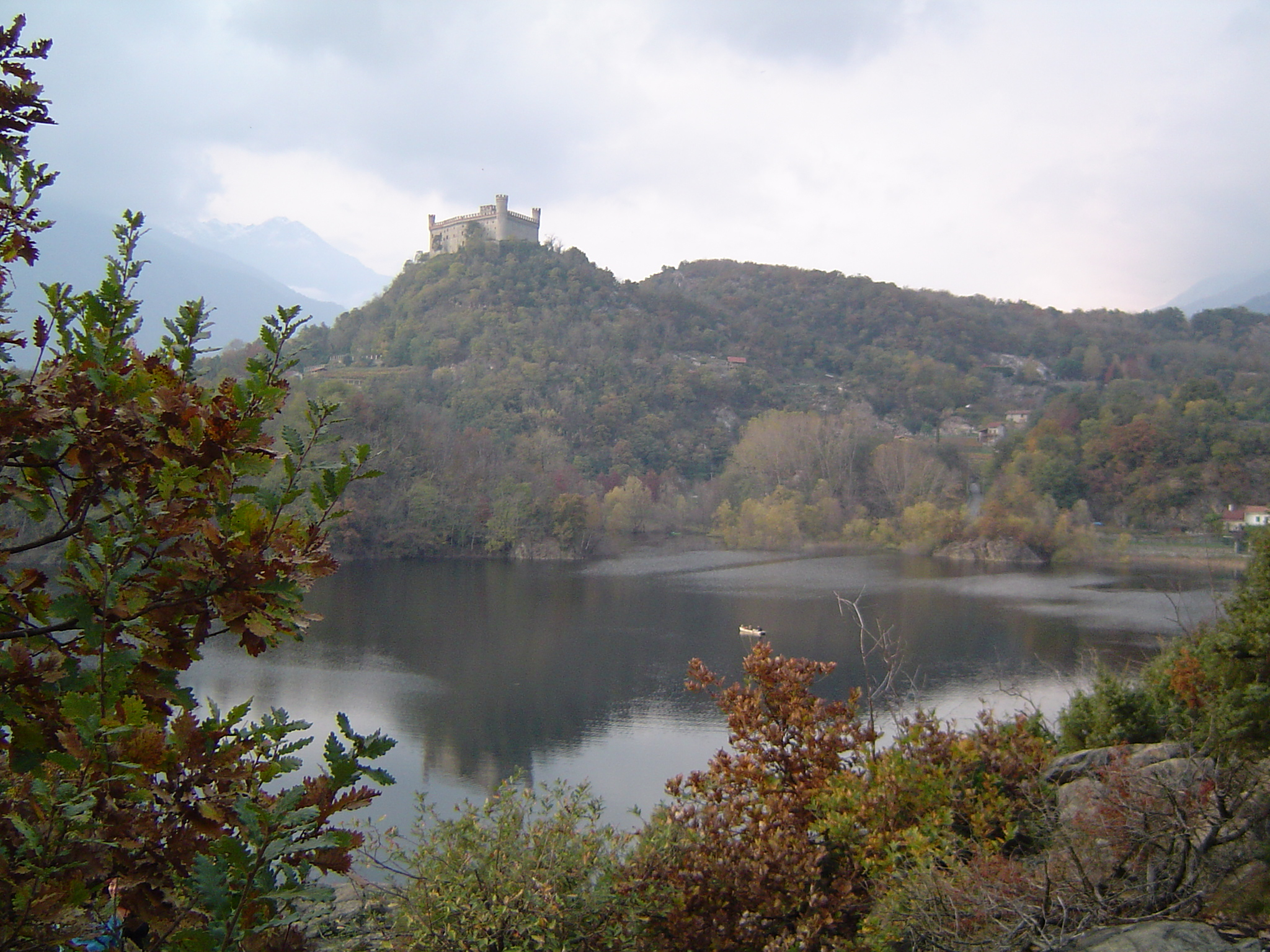
