= Orco =

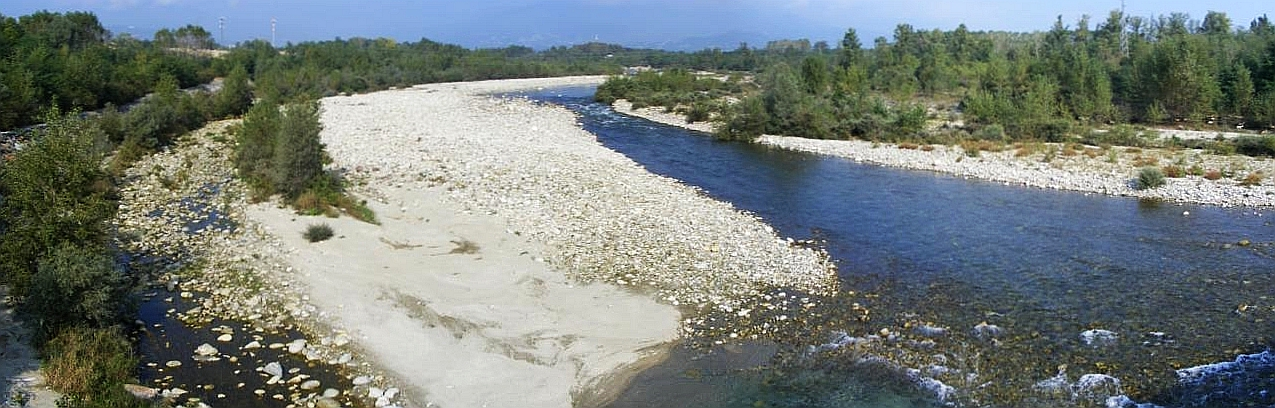
- The Orco near Rivarolo Canavese

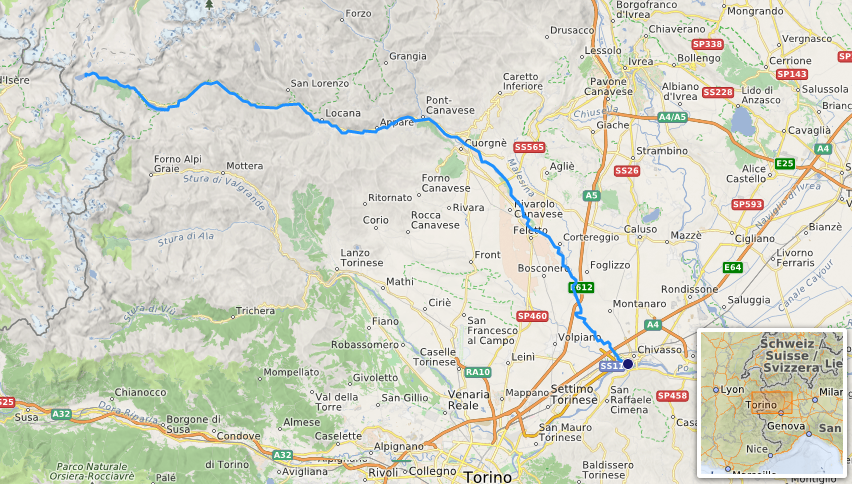
- Orco location

Location
- Country: Italy

Physical characteristics
- Source
  - location: Gran Paradiso
  - elevation: about 2,600 m (8,500 ft)
- Mouth
  - location: Po at Chivasso
  - coordinates: 45°11′00″N 7°52′30″E
- Length: 89.568 km (55.655 mi)
- Basin size: 889.4 km^{2} (343.4 mi^{2})
- Discharge
  - average: 23.9 m^{3}/s (840 cu ft/s)

Basin features
- Progression: Po→ Adriatic Sea
- Tributaries
  - left: Piantonetto, Eugio, Ribordone, Soana, Piova, Malesina
  - right: Gallenca

The Orco (Piedmontese: Eva d'òr, that is lit. Water of gold; Latin: Orgus) is an Italian river. It originates on the Piedmontese slopes of Gran Paradiso and after about 90 kilometres (56 mi) reaches the Po river near Chivasso, in the Metropolitan City of Turin. Its drainage basin is home to the most important complex of hydropower in Piedmont, consisting of six major dams (Agnel, Serrù, Ceresole Reale, Teleccio, Piantonetto, Valsoera), many smaller reservoirs and numerous turbines and power stations.

The Orco is known also for its gold-bearing sand, extracted already in antiquity. Even today there is a certain activity, on an amateur level, searching for grains of gold.

== See also ==
- Orco Valley
