= Sangone (disambiguation) =

Sangone may refer to:

- Sangone, the name of a turtle of divine origin featuring in Tongan myths
- Sangone (torrent), a river in Piedmont, Italy
- Val Sangone, a valley in Piedmont, Italy, see Franco-Provençal
