= Lake San Michele =

Lake of Piedmont, Northern Italy

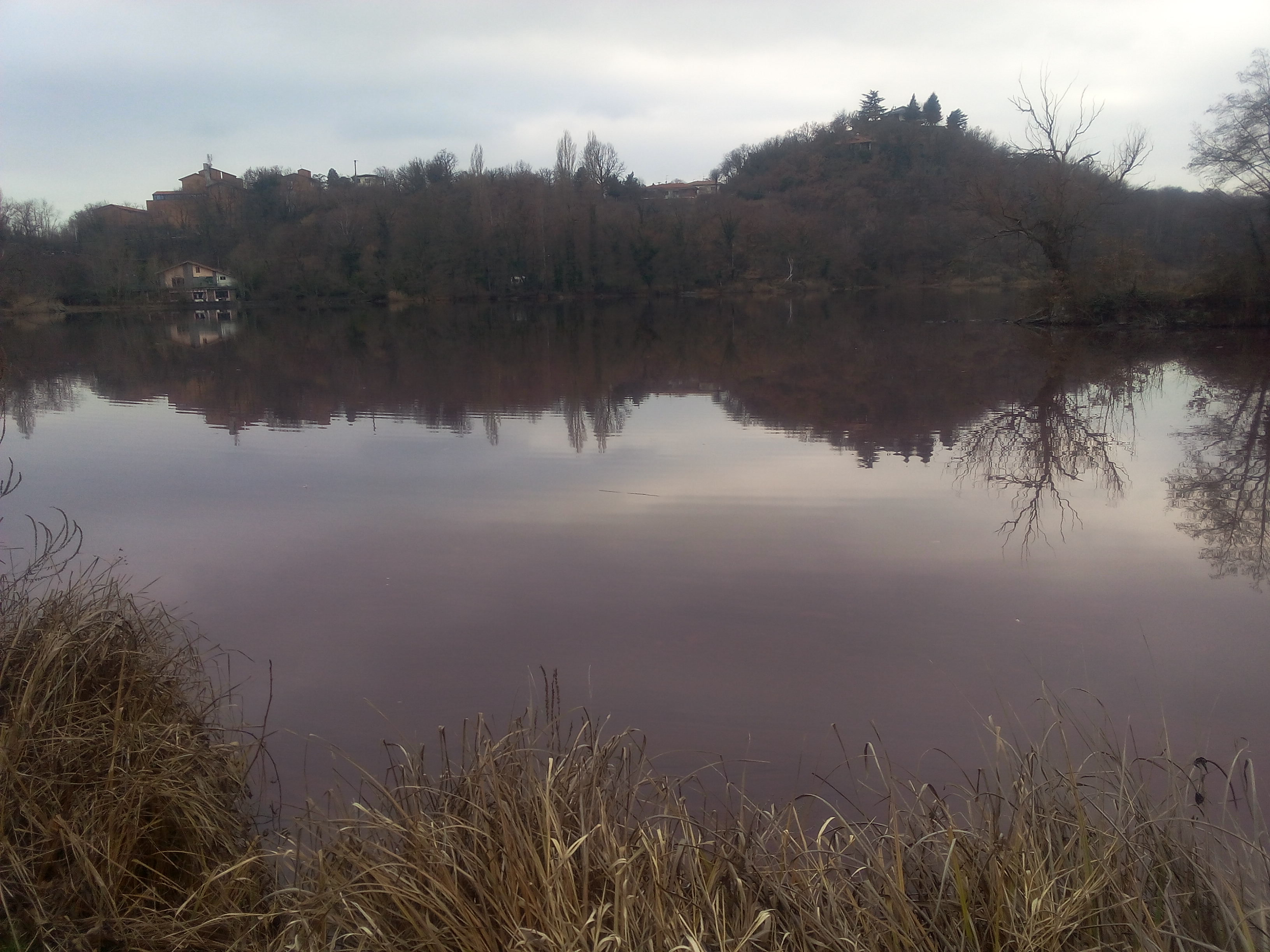

- Location within Piedmont
- Location: Ivrea, Piedmont
- Coordinates: 45°28′37″N 7°53′16″E
- Catchment area: 0.7 km^{2} (0.27 sq mi)
- Basin countries: Italy
- Surface area: 0.07 km^{2} (0.027 sq mi)
- Surface elevation: 238 m (781 ft)

Lake San Michele (Italian: Lago San Michele) is a lake located in Ivrea, Piedmont, Italy.

== Description ==
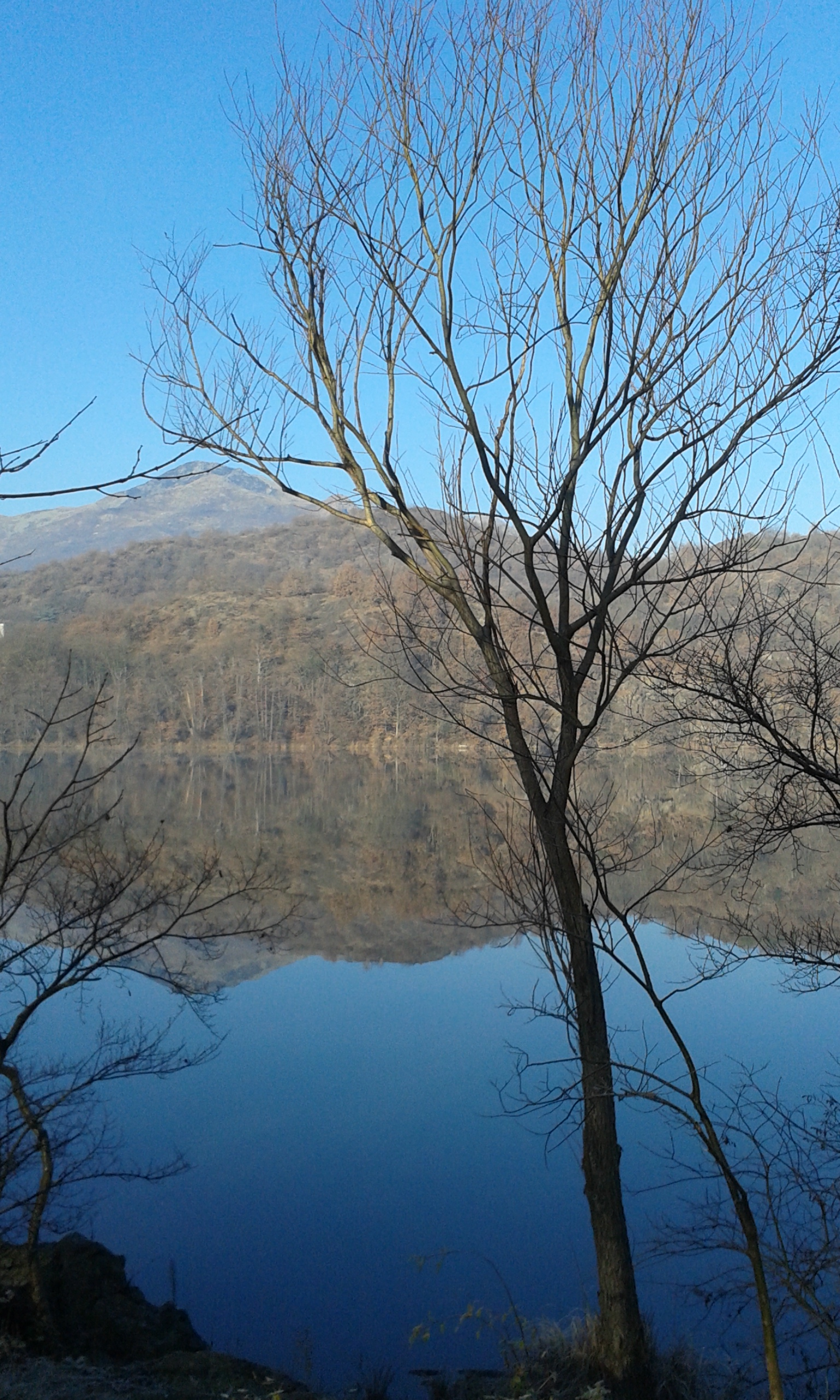
Lake San Michele in December 2015

The lake forms part of the group of the Five Lakes of Ivrea, along with lakes Sirio, Nero, Pistono, and Campagna. It has a water surface area of 0.07 km², a basin area of 0.7 km², and is located at an altitude of 238 meters above sea level. It is an area of interest from zoological, geological, and botanical perspectives.

The lake is overlooked to the south by the hill where the Monte Stella Sanctuary is located. Part of the area around the lake is included in the Polveriera Park of the municipality of Ivrea.

As with other bodies of water in the area, it is a glacial lake formed by the retreat of the Balteo Glacier.

== Nature protection ==
The lake partly falls within the Site of Community Importance known as Laghi di Ivrea (code IT1110021), established under Directive 92/43/EEC (Habitats Directive) and designated as a Special Area of Conservation.
