= Lake Pistono =

Lake of Piedmont, Northern Italy

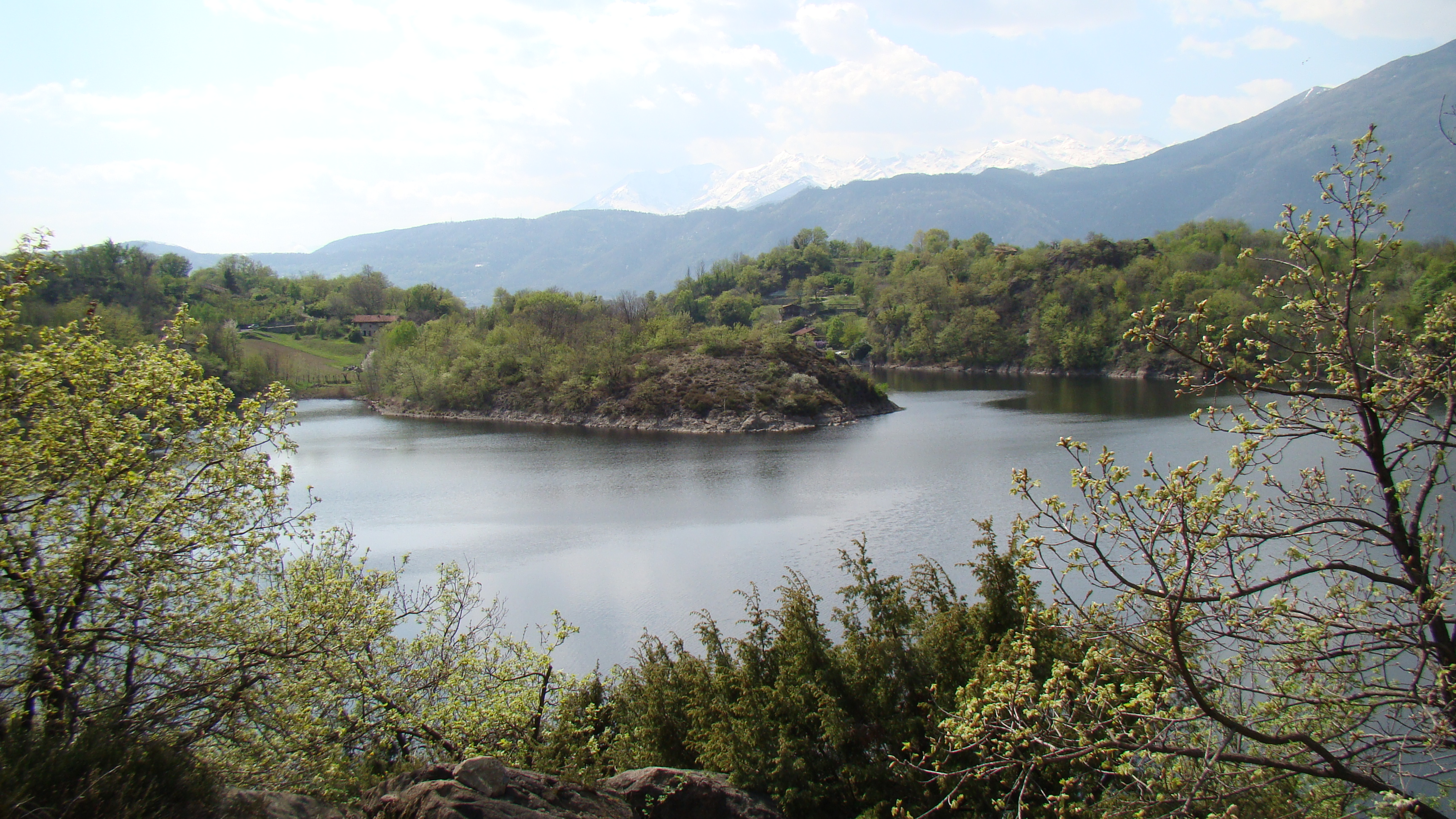
- Lake Pistono in 2009

- Location within Piedmont
- Location: Montalto Dora, Piedmont
- Coordinates: 45°29′34″N 7°52′28″E
- Catchment area: 2.8 km^{2} (1.1 sq mi)
- Basin countries: Italy
- Max. length: 0.53 km (0.33 mi)
- Max. width: 0.37 km (0.23 mi)
- Surface area: 0.12 km^{2} (0.046 sq mi)
- Max. depth: 16 m (52 ft)
- Surface elevation: 280 m (920 ft)

Lake Pistono (Italian: Lago Pistono), also known as Lake Montalto (Italian: Lago di Montalto), is a lake located in Montalto Dora, Piedmont, Italy.

== Description ==
The lake has a water surface area of 0.12 km², a basin area of 2.8 km², and is located at an altitude of 280 meters above sea level. It is part of a group of five lakes of glacial origin, which also include Lake Sirio, Lake Nero, Lake Campagna, and Lake San Michele. It is fed by the Rio Montesino stream, which collects water descending from Punta Montesino, while at the western end, there is an artificial canal that once supplied a mill. The outflow of water is regulated by a small dam.

The entire lake is surrounded by a trail. On the northern side, at the top of Mount Crovero, stands the imposing Montalto Dora Castle, which is reflected in the waters of the lake below.

== Archaeological park ==
Thanks to an archaeological excavation campaign conducted by the Superintendence of Archaeology, Fine Arts, and Landscape of Turin, traces of a lakeside village dating back to the Neolithic were uncovered on the shores of the lake in June 2003.

In 2005, a cultural and tourist project was launched, culminating in 2012 with the inauguration of an exhibition space showcasing the artifacts discovered during the excavations. This was followed, in 2017, by the opening of an archaeological park on the lakeshore, where Neolithic structures have been reconstructed at full scale.

== Nature protection ==
The lake is part of the Site of Community Importance known as Laghi di Ivrea (code IT1110021), established under Directive 92/43/EEC (Habitats Directive) and designated as a Special Area of Conservation.

== Gallery ==
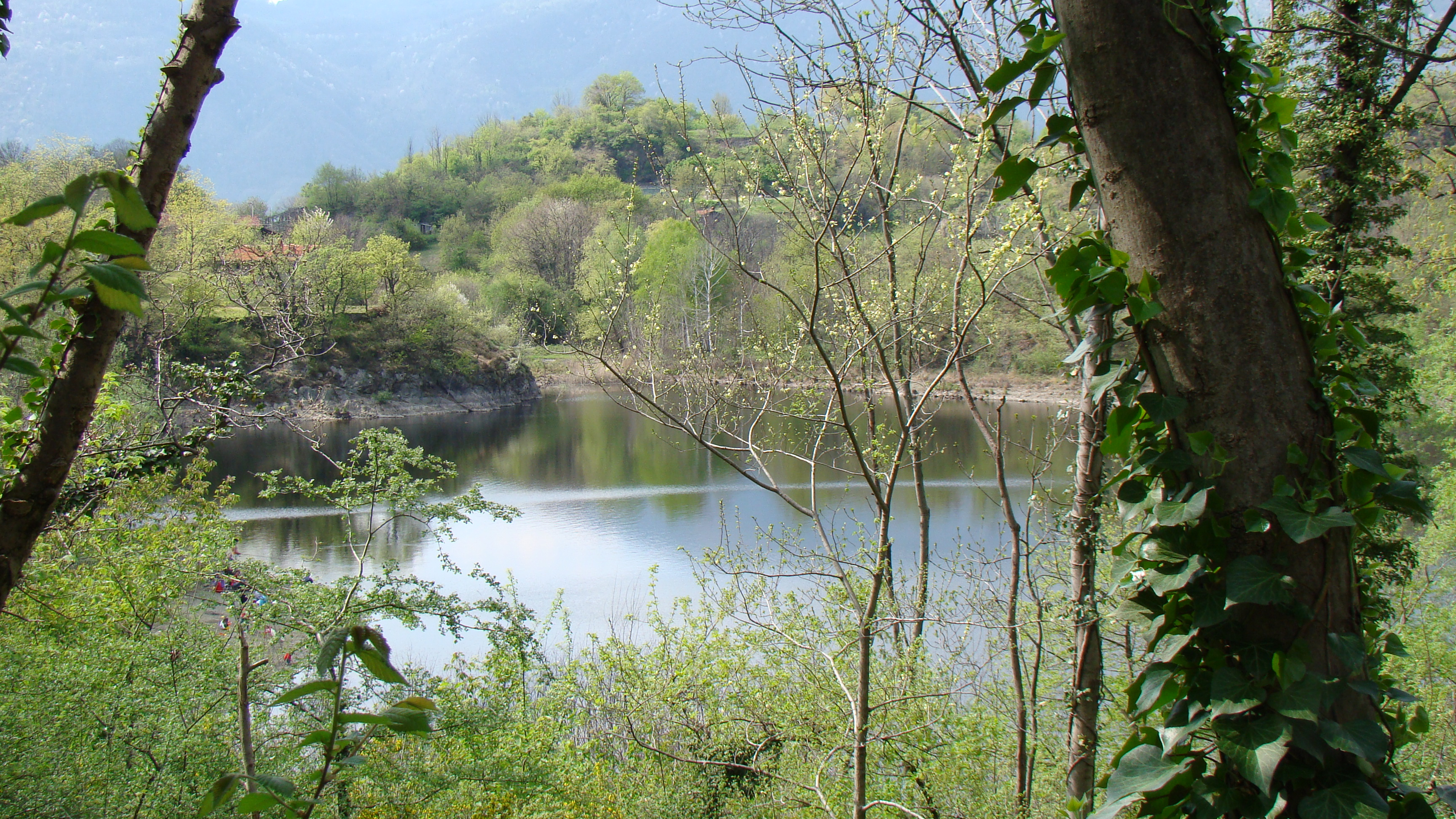

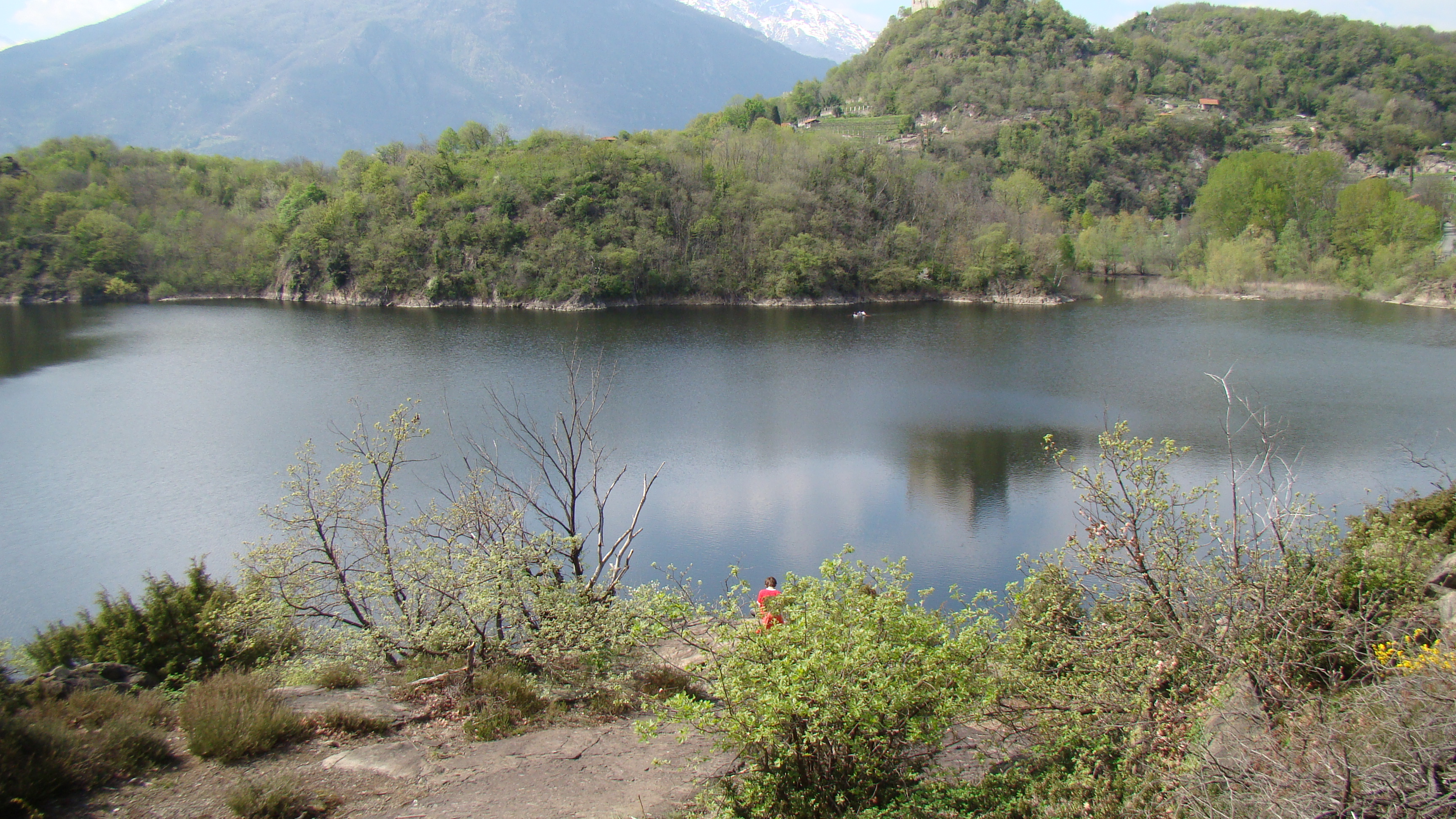

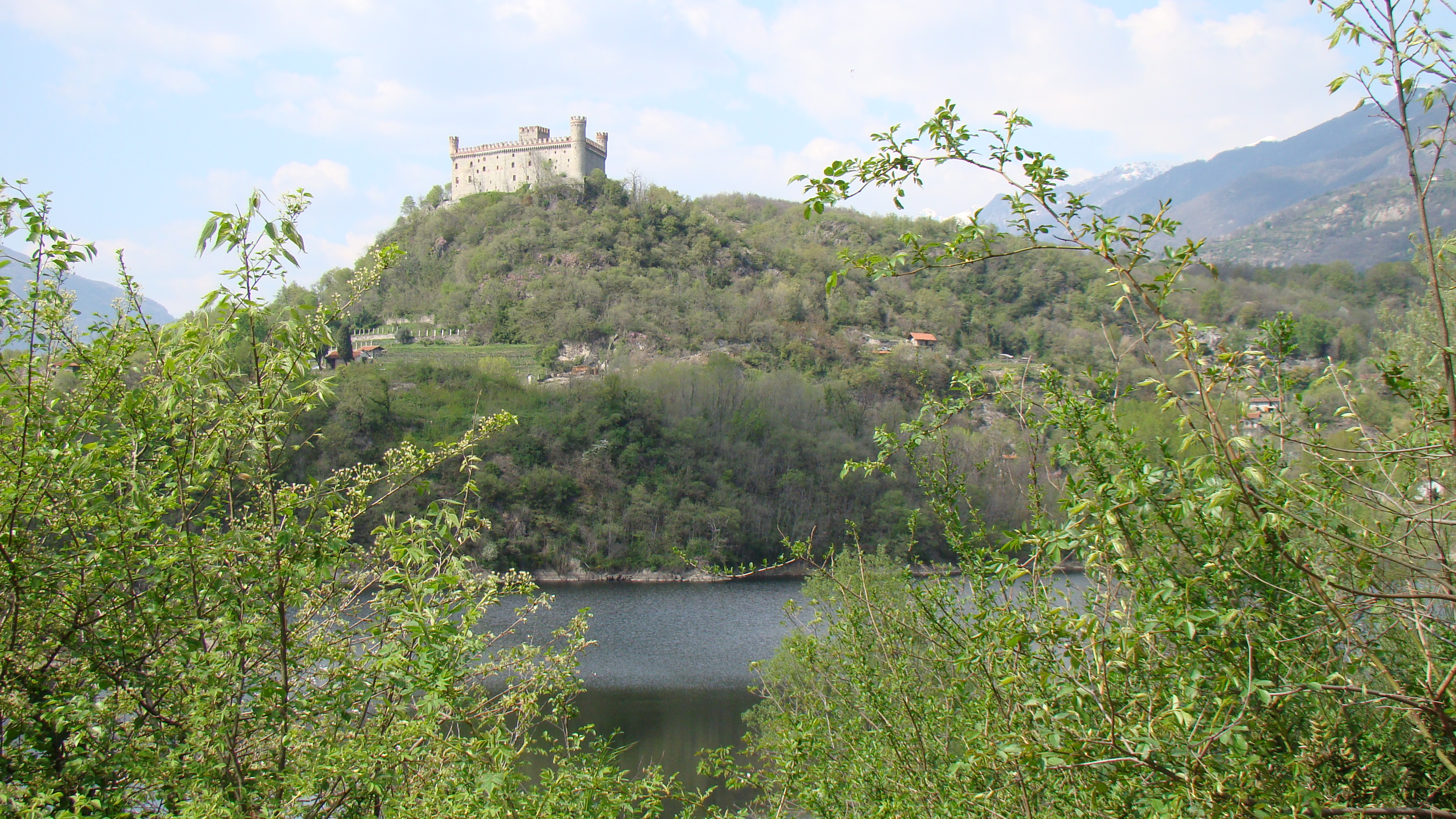
