= San Silvestro, Chiaverano =

San Silvestro
- Chiesa di San Silvestro (Italian)
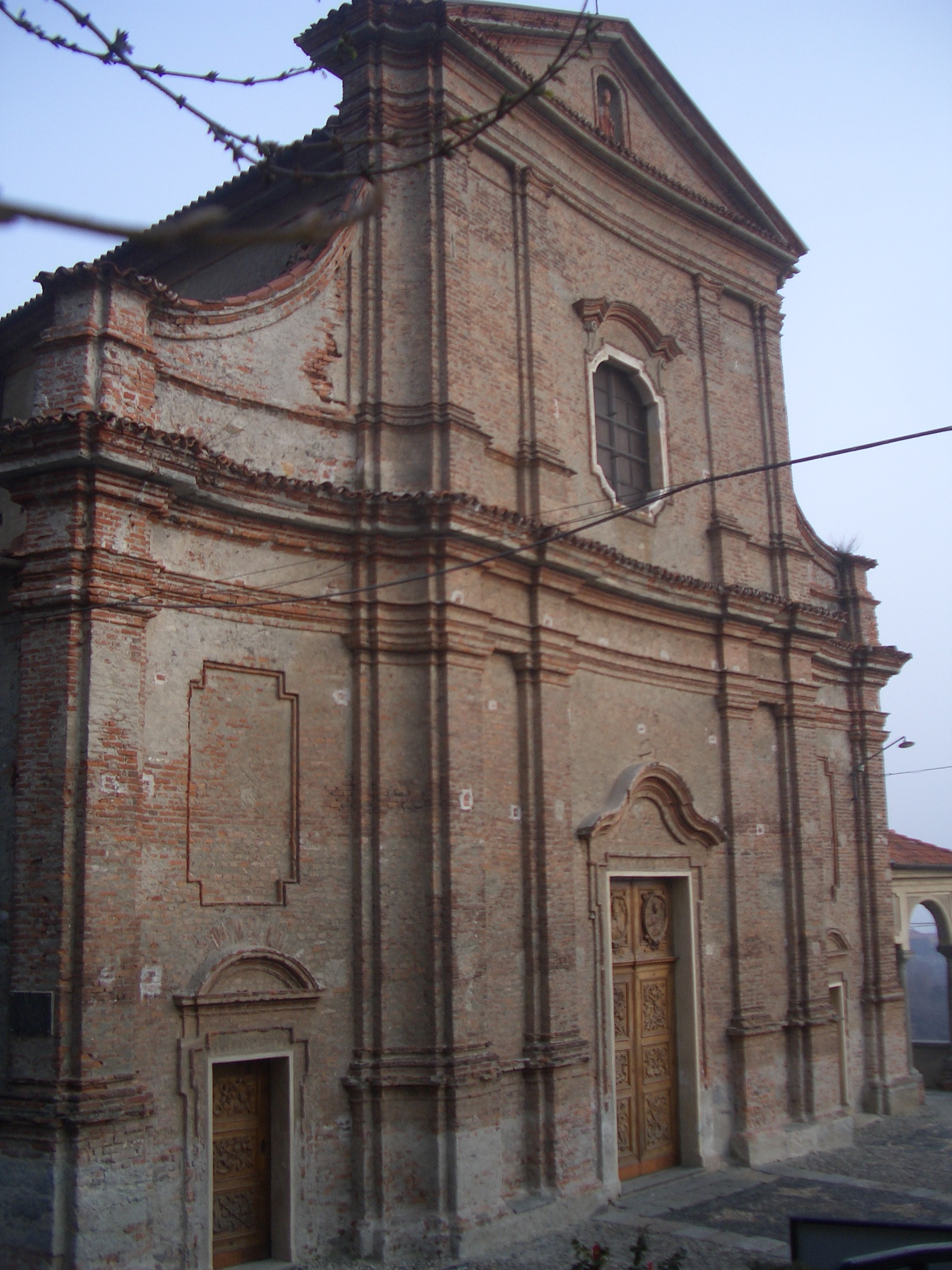
- San Silvestro, Chiaverano in 2008
- Click on the map for a fullscreen view
- 45°29′51″N 7°54′10.83″E
- Country: Italy
- Denomination: Roman Catholic

Architecture
- Functional status: Active

Administration
- Diocese: Diocese of Ivrea

San Silvestro is a Roman Catholic church located in Chiaverano, Italy.

== History ==
The first construction of the church dates back to the 13th century. Originally modest in size, the church was expanded in the 17th and 18th centuries.

After being looted by the French, the church was rebuilt starting in 1741 and completed in 1744. A tall stone bell tower was added in 1764. Originally, it had a wooden dome, but this was destroyed by a fire in 1834 and subsequently replaced with a masonry roof in 1848.

== Description ==
The patrons of Chiaverano, Saint Sylvester and Saint Theodora, are depicted on the main door of the church. A late 14th-century fresco portraying the Madonna and Child between Saints is located in the outer lunette of the church's small loggia.

The church's tall bell tower reaches a height of 65 meters.

== Gallery ==
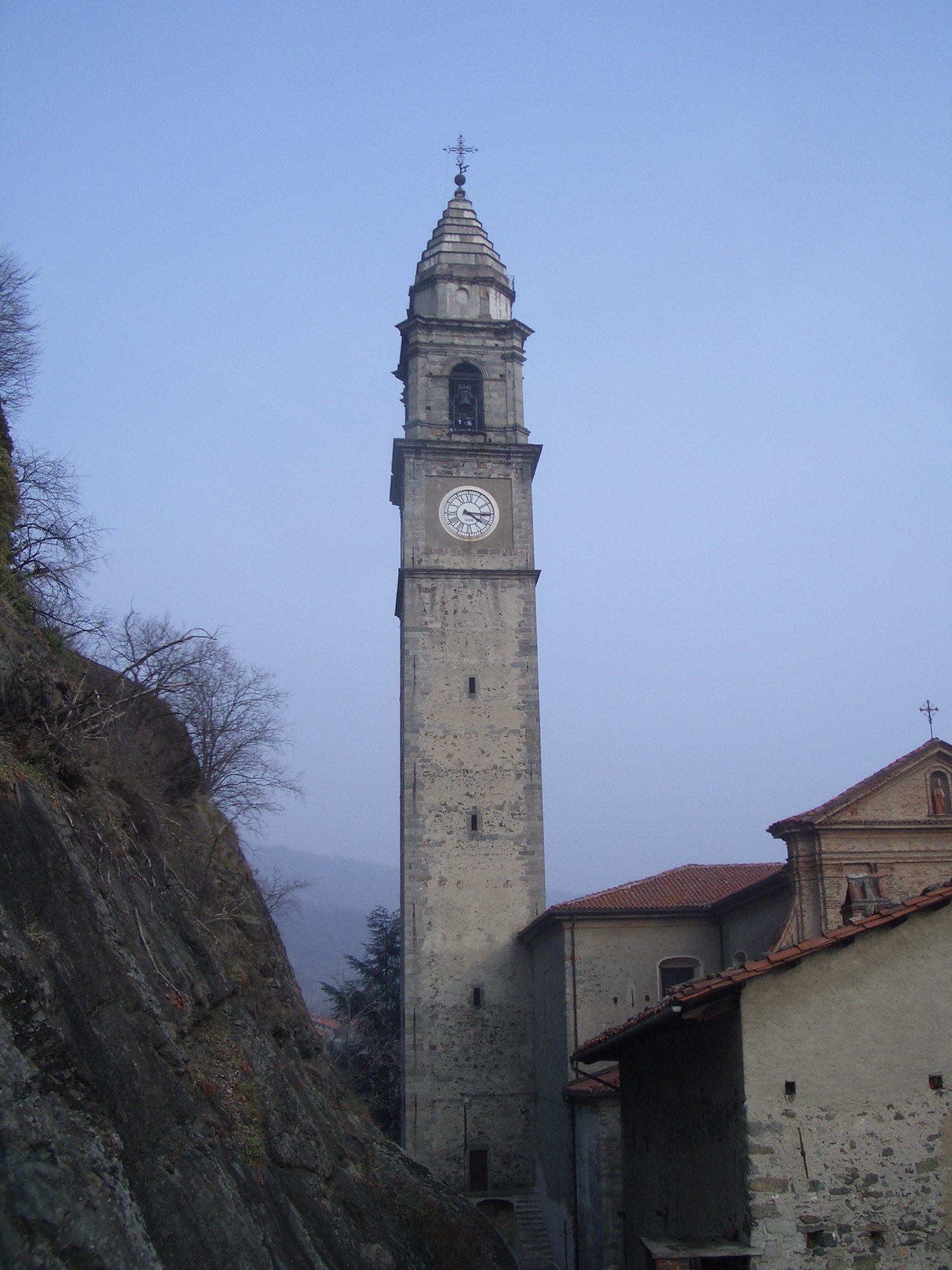

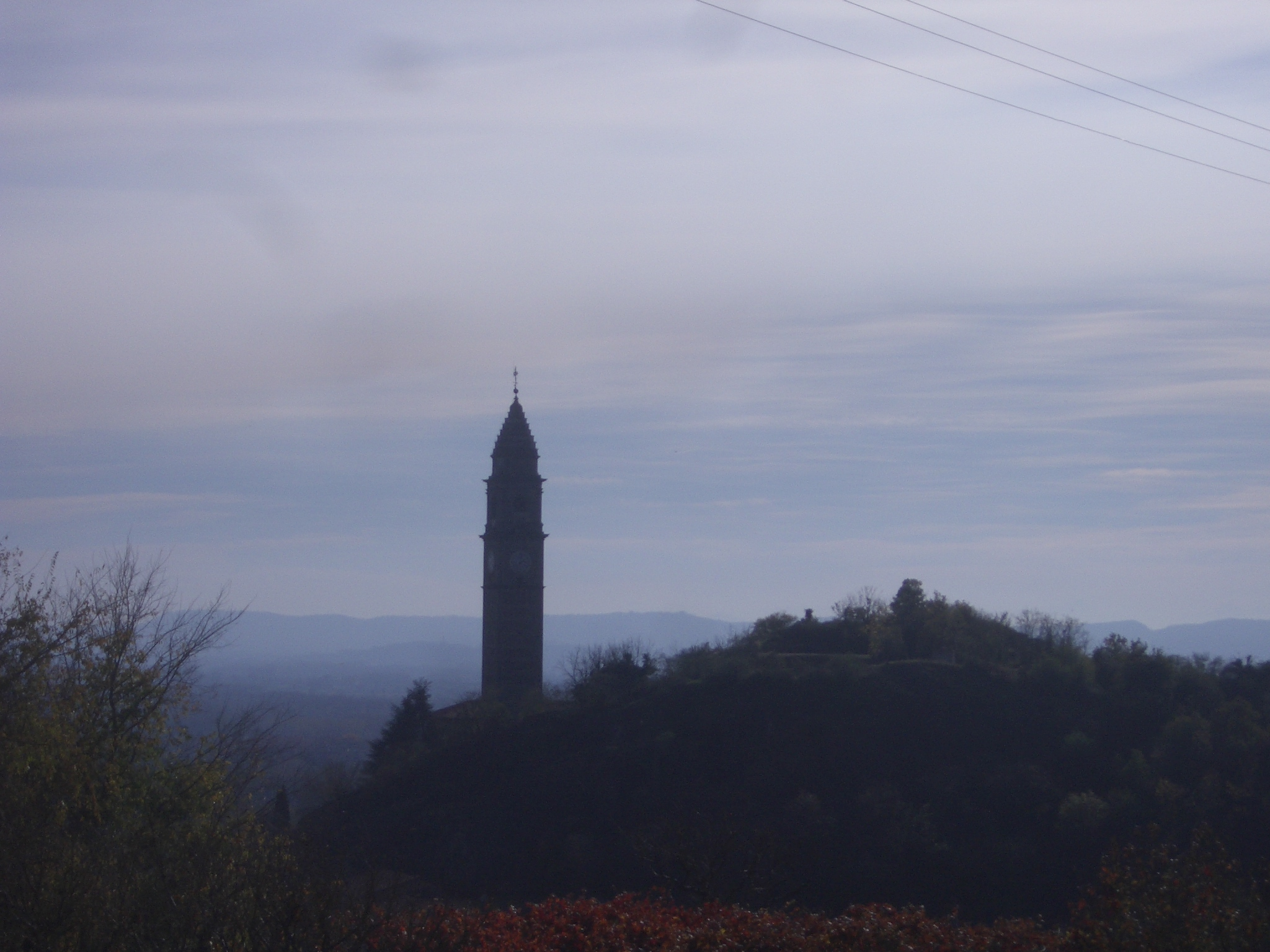

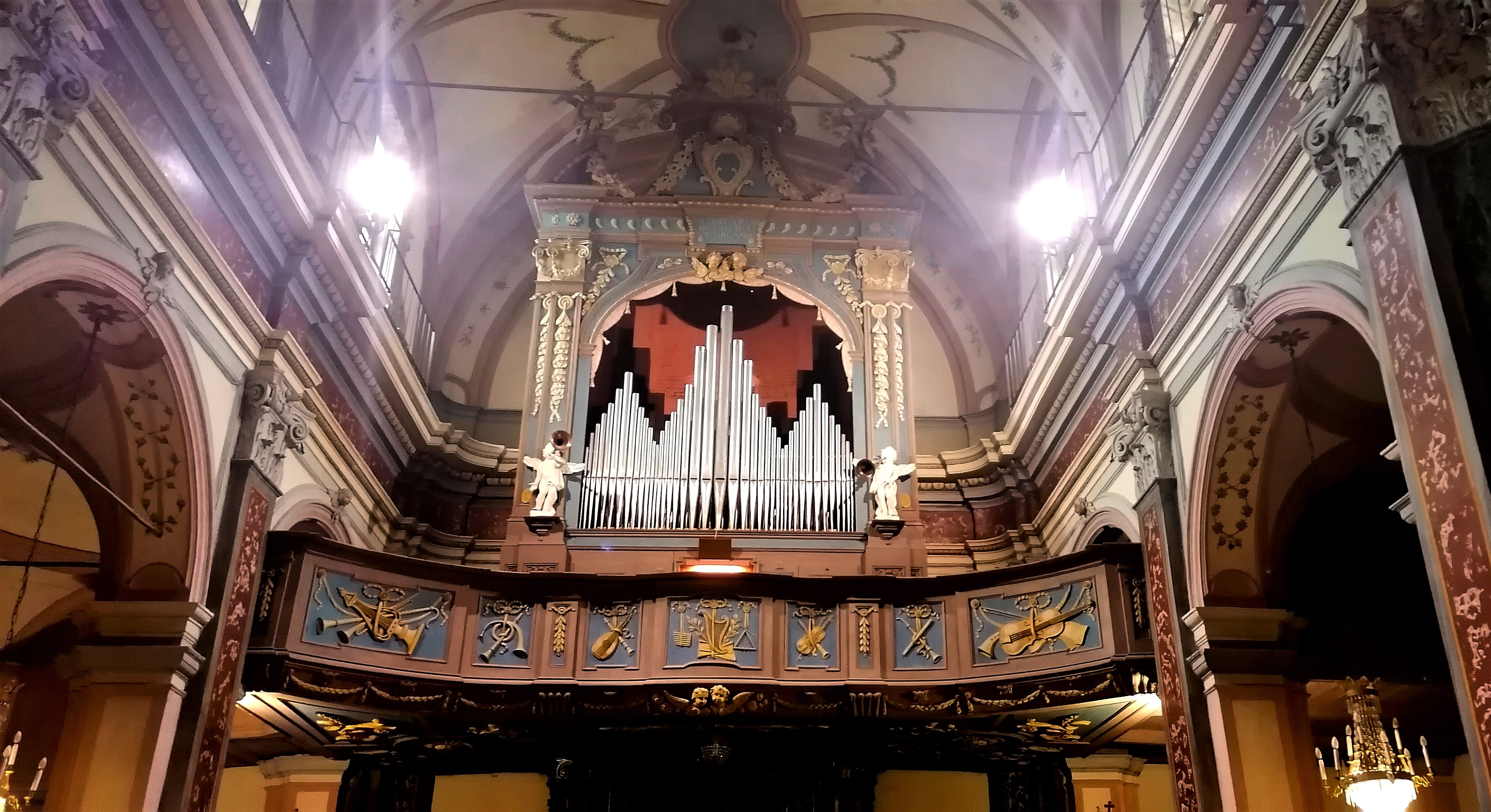
