= Soana (river) =

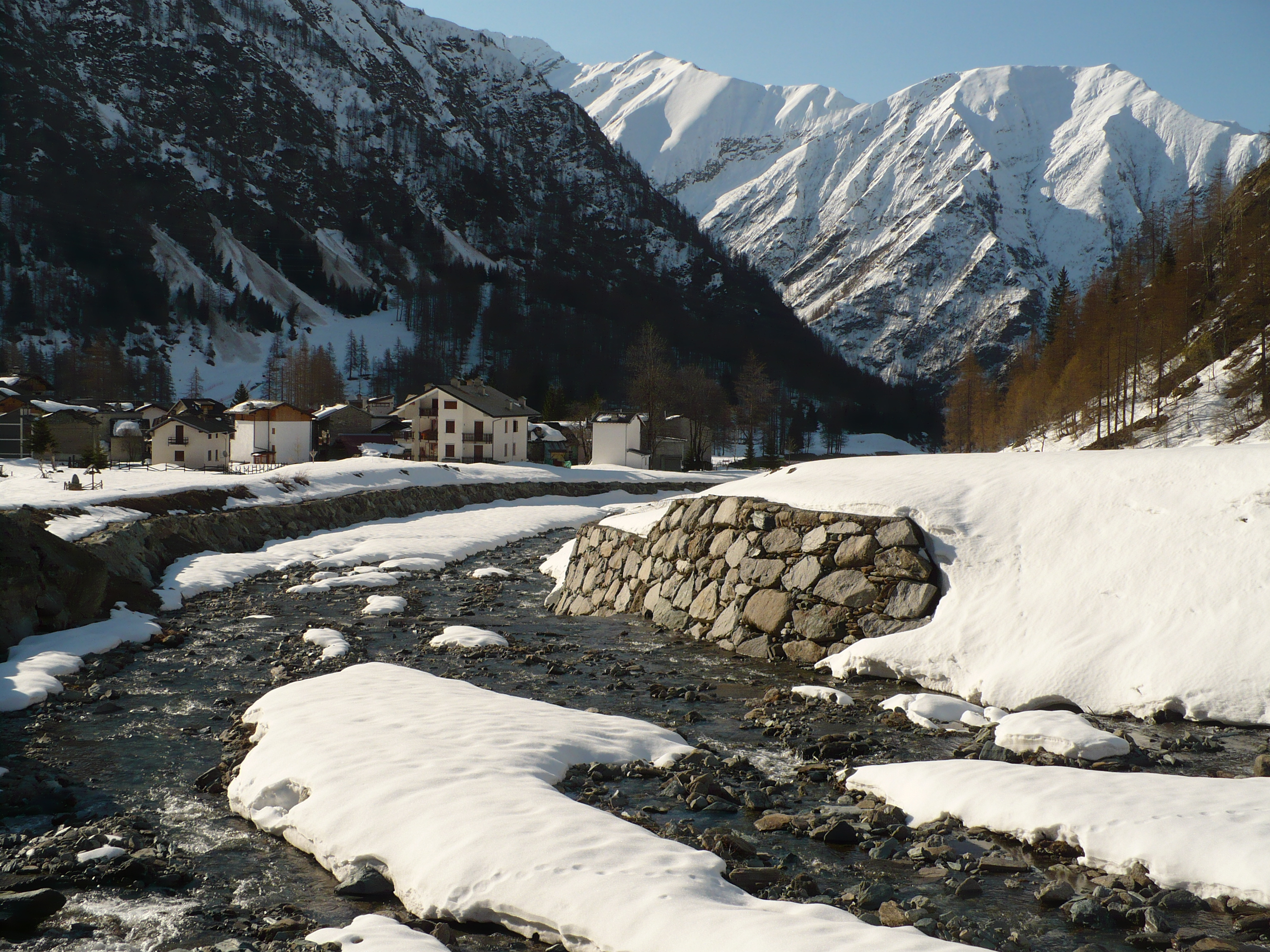

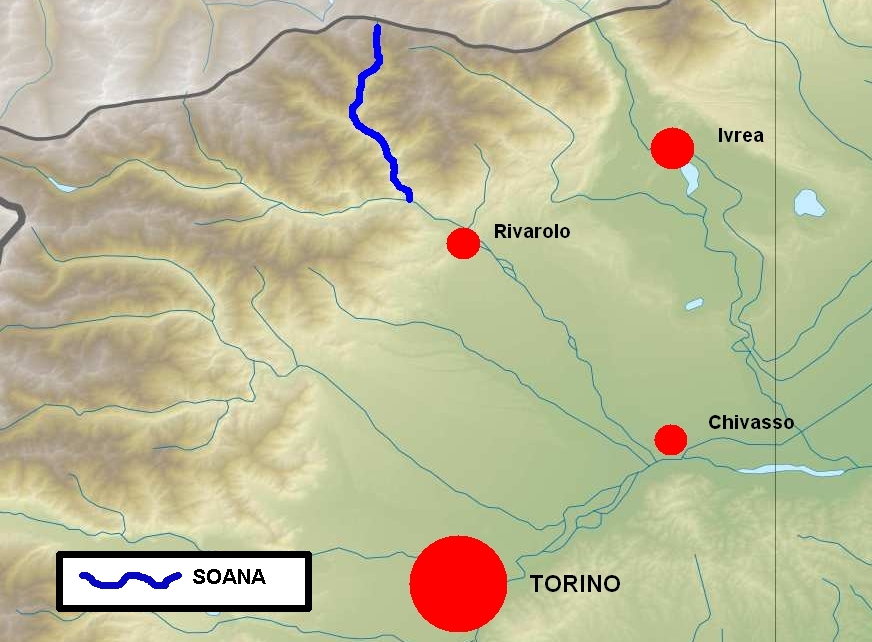
- Soana location within the province of Turin

Location
- Country: Italy: province of Turin

Physical characteristics
- Mouth
  - location: Orco in Pont Canavese
  - coordinates: 45.4191°N 7.6040°E
- Length: 24.7 km (15.3 mi)
- Basin size: 213.7 km^{2} (82.5 mi^{2})
- Discharge
  - average: (mouth) 7.1 m^{3}/s (250 cu ft/s)

Basin features
- Progression: Orco→ Po→ Adriatic Sea

The Soana is a small 24-kilometre (15 mi) torrent of the Province of Turin, Piedmont in north-west Italy, draining a basin of some 214 square kilometres (83 mi^{2}). Its headwaters are above Pianprato, in Valprato Soana, where a number of smaller torrents converge. It is the principal tributary of the Orco, which it joins at Pont Canavese.
