= Lanzo Valleys =

Triple valley in North Italy

- Valli di Lanzo
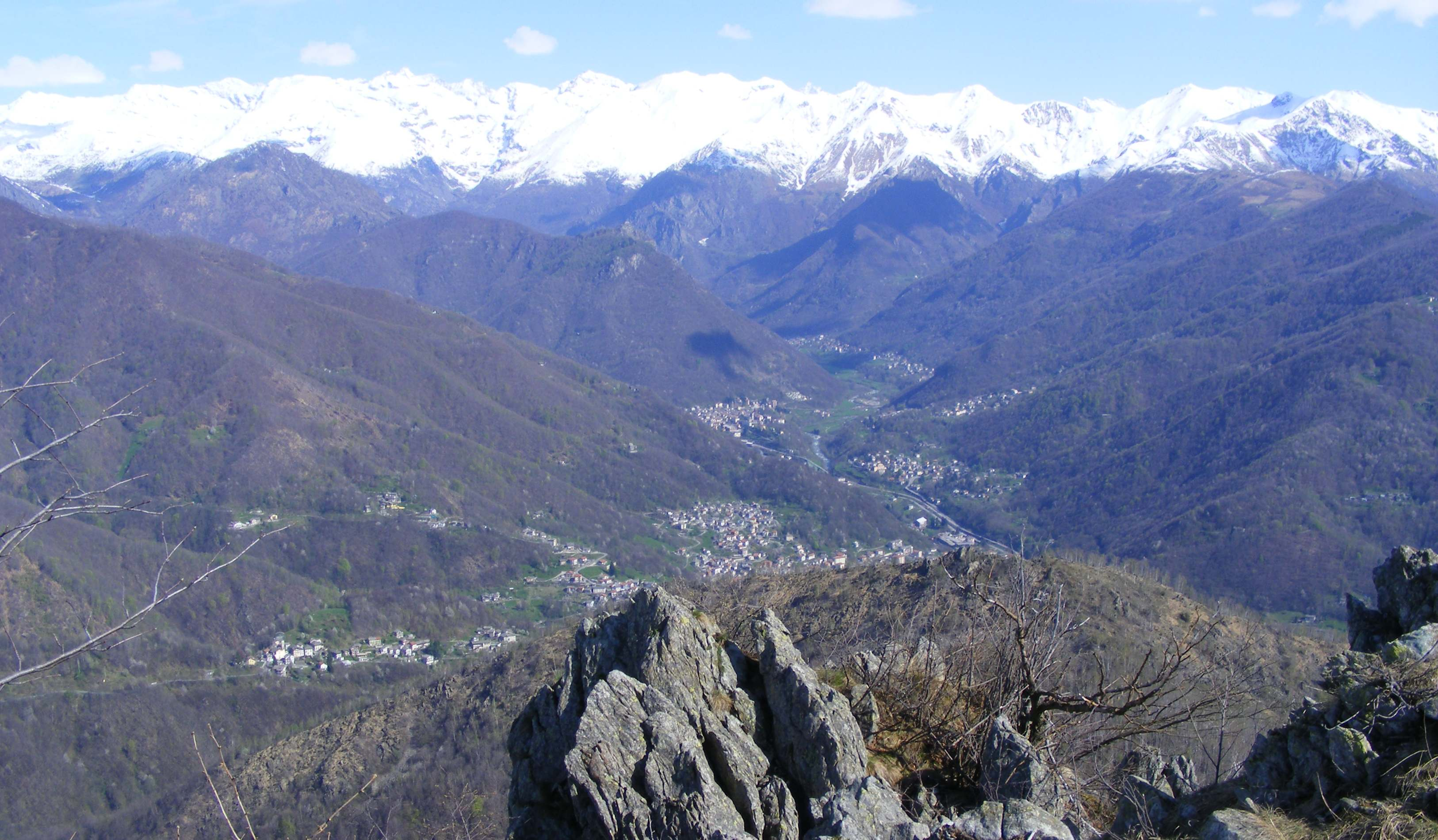
- The valleys as seen from Punta Lunelle

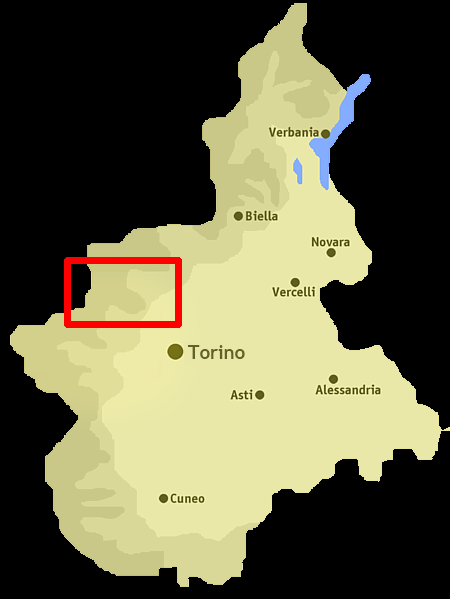
- Location of the valley in Piedmont, NW Italy
- Floor elevation: 500–3,670 m (1,640–12,040 ft)
- Length: around 40 km (25 mi) west east

Geology
- Type: River valley

Geography
- Location: Piedmont, Italy
- Coordinates: 45°16′59″N 7°24′00″E
- Rivers: Stura di Lanzo

The Lanzo Valleys (in Italian Valli di Lanzo, in Piedmontese Valade ëd Lans) is a group of three valleys in the north-west of Piedmont in the Metropolitan City of Turin, Italy. They are located in the Graian Alps of Piedmont, between the Valle dell'Orco to the north and the Val di Susa to the south. Crossed by various streams which in each valley is called Stura and which flow into the river Stura di Lanzo, the valleys take their name from the town of Lanzo, located on an ancient glacial moraine at the end of the valleys.

== Etymology ==
The valleys take their name from the city of Lanzo, which lies in the main valley near its exit on the Po Plain.

== Geography ==
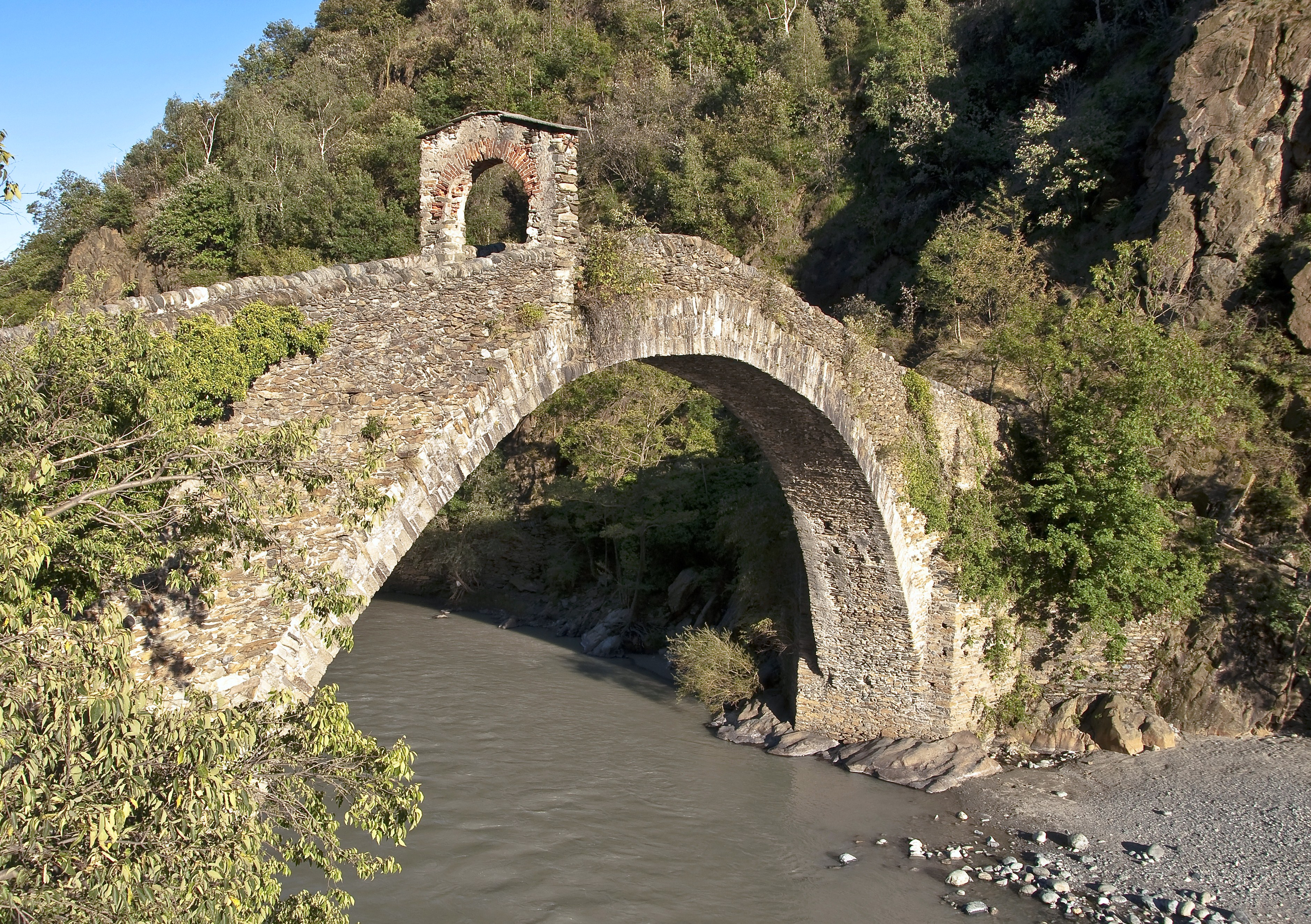
The Devil's bridge on the Stura di Lanzo, where the valley meets the Po plain

The Lanzo Valleys (in Italian Valli di Lanzo, in Piedmontese Valade ëd Lans) are a group of valleys in the north-west of Piedmont in the Graian Alps of Piedmont, between the Valle dell'Orco to the north and the Val di Susa to the south. The most important sub-valleys are, from south to north and from west to east,

1. Valle di Viù (literally Valley of Viù) with its main centers Viù, Lemie, Usseglio.
2. Val d'Ala (literally Valley of Ala) with its main centers: Ala di Stura and Balme.
3. Val Grande (literally Great Valley), with its main centers of Cantoira, Chialamberto and Groscavallo.
4. Val Tesso (literally Valley of Tesso, named after the Tesso a left-hand tributary of Stura di Lanzo)

The Val Grande di Lanzo joins the Val d'Ala in Ceres; from here the two valleys descend joined through the villages of Mezzenile and Pessinetto; in the municipality of Traves they join the Valle di Viù and from here the 3 valleys continue together as one.

The Stura di Lanzo, a tributary of the Po, collects the waters flowing through the valleys.

Other municipalities of the area are Germagnano, Monastero di Lanzo and Coassolo Torinese.

== Access ==
The valleys can be reached by the Po Plain either by railway, with the Ferrovia Torino-Ceres, or by road, following the strada provinciale n.1 named "Direttisima delle Valli di Lanzo".

The valleys of Lanzo are closed valleys, that is, they do not have Alpine passes connecting them with France and nearby Italian valleys. There are 3 exceptions:

1. the Colle del Lys, crossed by the provincial road that connects Viù with the lower Valle di Susa.
2. the Colle della Dieta, which connects the hamlet Asciutti di Viù with the hamlet of Monti di Mezzenile,
3. and partly also the Colle del Colombardo, through which a dirt road passes, open only a few months a year, which goes from Villa di Lemie to Condove.

The following passes can be reached by footpath:

- Collerin Pass - 3,202 m - from Bessans to Balme (Val d'Ala)
- Colle di Sea - 3,083 m - from Bonneval-sur-Arc to Forno Graian Alps (Val Grande di Lanzo)
- Colle dell'Autaret - 3,070 m - from Bessans to Usseglio (Valle di Viù)
- Colle di Girard - 3,044 m - from Bonneval-sur-Arc to Forno Alpi Graie, a fraction of Groscavallo (Val Grande di Lanzo)
- Colle d'Arnas - 3,010 m - from Bessans to Balme (Val d'Ala)
- Collarin d'Arnas - 2,850 m - from Balme (Val d'Ala) to Usseglio (Valle di Viù)
- Ghicet di Sea - 2,735 m - from Balme (Val d'Ala) to Forno Graian Alps (Val Grande di Lanzo)
- Colle della Crocetta - 2,636 m - from Ceresole Reale (Valle dell'Orco) to Forno Alpi Graie (Val Grande di Lanzo)
- Colle Croce di Ferro - 2,546 m - from Bussoleno (Valle di Susa) to Usseglio (Valle di Viù)
- Paschiet Pass - 2,431 m - from Balme (Val d'Ala) to Lemie (Valle di Viù)
- Passo della Croce - 1,254 m - from Vallo Torinese (Val Ceronda) to Germagnano (main valley of Lanzo).

== Notable summits ==
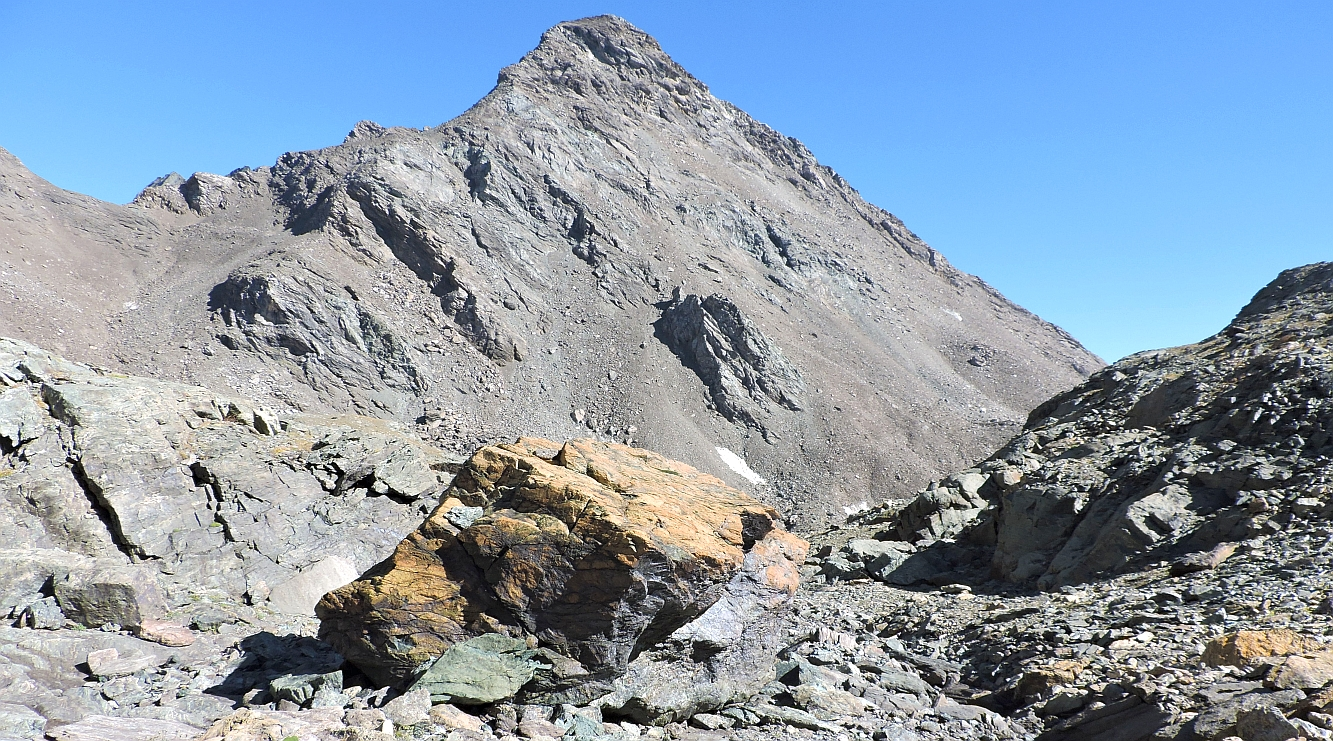
Punta Sulè

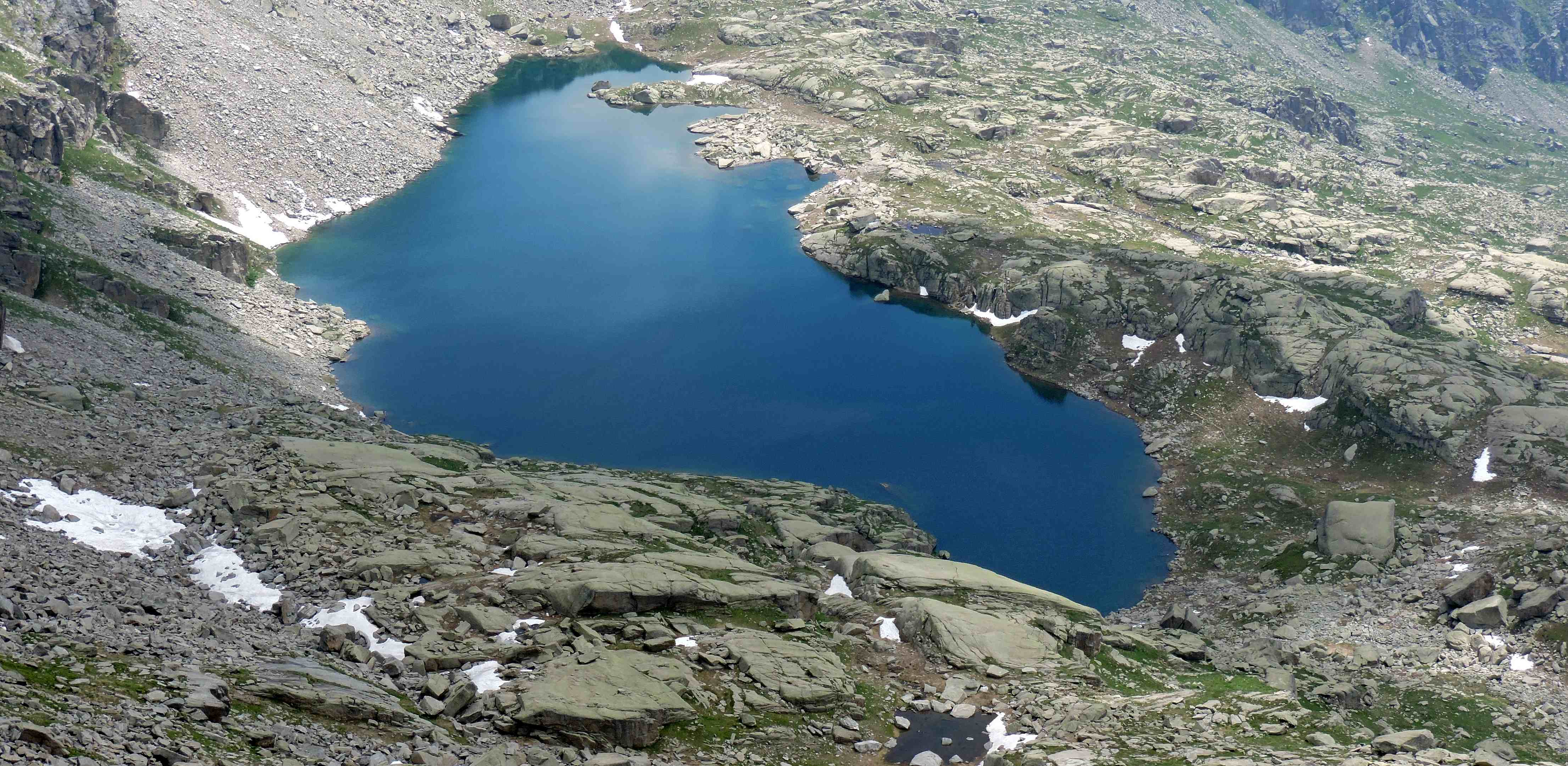
Lago di Unghiasse, the whider natural lake of the valleys

The Lanzo Valleys are surrounded by some of the major peaks of Piedmont, especially along the border line with France. Starting from the north and descending to the south there are:

- Levanna - 3,619 m
- Uia di Ciamarella - 3,676 m
- Uia di Bessanese - 3,606 m
- Punta d'Arnas - 3,560 m
- Croce Rossa - 3,566 m
- Rocciamelone - 3,538 m
- Punta Sulè - 3,384 m
- Uia di Mondrone - 2,964 m
- Punta Lunella - 2,272 m
- Monte Civrari - 2,302 m
- Monte Colombano - 1,658 m.
