= Punta Lunella =

Mountain in Italy

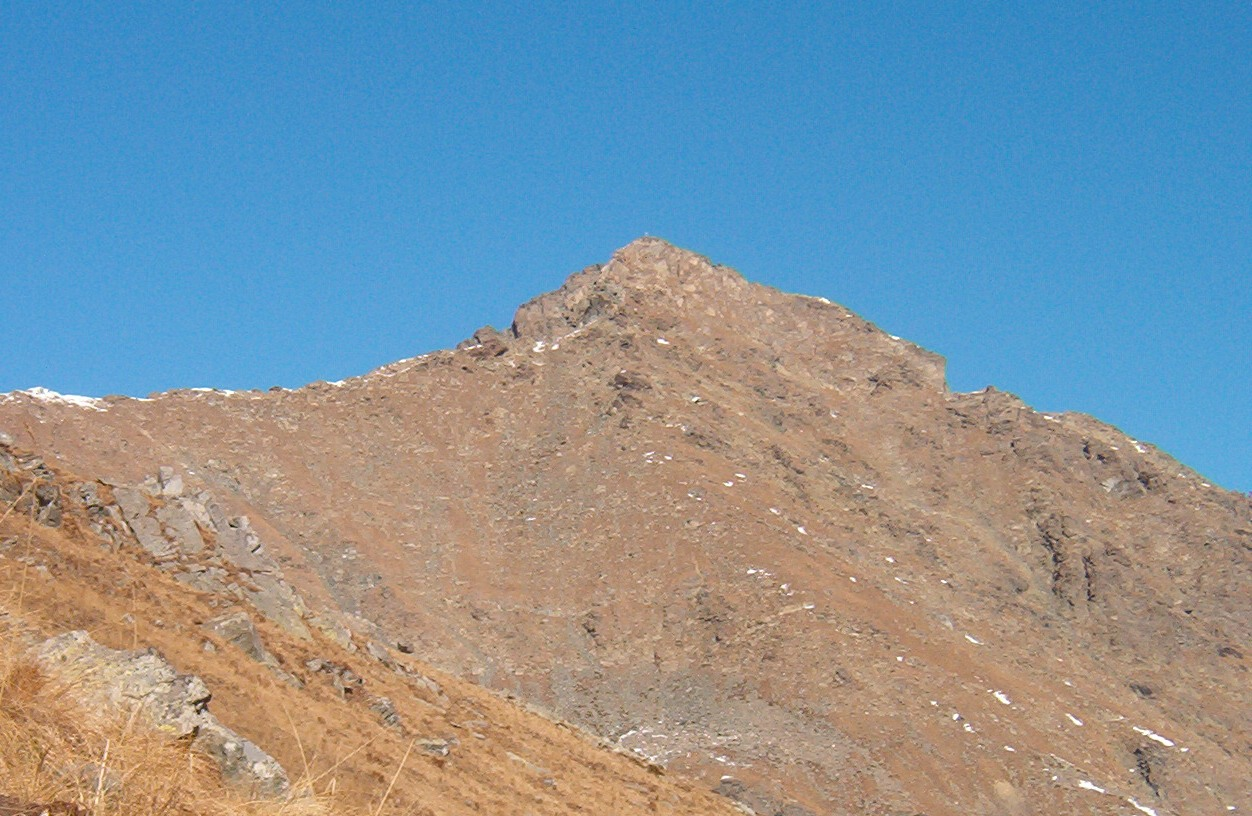
- Punta Lunella S face

Highest point
- Elevation: 2,772 m (9,094 ft)
- Prominence: 471 m (1,545 ft)
- Isolation: 5.38 km (3.34 mi)
- Listing: Alpine mountains 2500-2999 m
- Coordinates: 45°11′46″N 7°13′05″E

Geography
- Location within Alps
- Location: Province of Turin, Italy
- Parent range: Graian Alps

Climbing
- First ascent: 23 June 1873; Martino Baretti with the guide Giuseppe Cibrario
- Easiest route: hiking/scrambling from Colle del Colombardo or Niquidetto

The Punta Lunella is a mountain of the Graian Alps, with an elevation of 2,772 m.

== Toponymy ==
In 1831 the mountain was named Punta Cruvin by the topographer Maggi after a nearby mountain pasture, "Alpe Cruvin". In the 1845 release of the Kingdom of Sardinia chart the mountain appears as Punta di Cruvin, while a toponym Punta Lunel (also derived from the name of a mountain pasture) was applied to a lesser summit between the present-day Punta Lunella (2,772 m) and the Grand'Uja (2,666 m). On the following editions of the national topographic map, the name Lunella (in the forms of La Lunella or Punta Lunella) is permanently given to the 2,772 m mountain summit.

== Geography ==
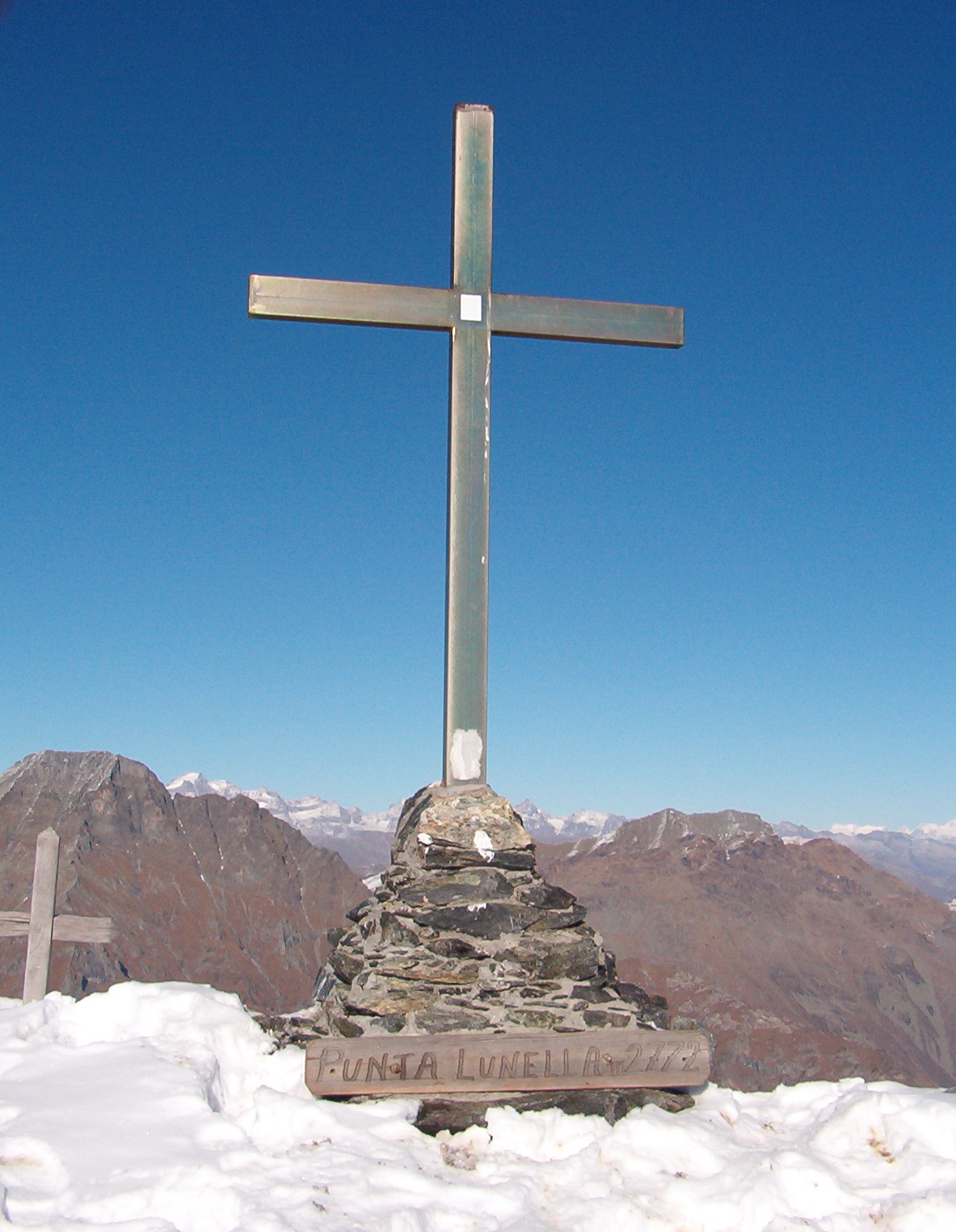
Summit cross

The mountain is located on the ridge dividing Val Susa (South) from Val di Viù, and stands on the border between the comunes of Viù and Lemie (both in the Metropolitan City of Turin). Toward SE a mountain pass named Colle della Forcola (2,480 m) divides Punta Lunella from Rocca Maritano, while the main ridge goes west heading to the Rocciamelone.

In the SOIUSA (International Standardized Mountain Subdivision of the Alps) subdivision of the Alps the mountain, along with Monte Arpone, gives its name to the Alpine subgroup Cresta Lunella-Arpone (code = I/B-7.I-A.2.b).

== Access to the summit ==
The easiest route for the summit is a footpath starting from the Prarotto chapel, a small isolated church in the comune of Condove (Susa Valley). A second route, slightly harder and which needs some scrambling, starts from Pian Benot, a small sky resort in the Viù Valley.

== Maps ==
- Italian official cartography (Istituto Geografico Militare - IGM); on-line version: www.pcn.minambiente.it
- I.G.C. (Istituto Geografico Centrale): Carta dei sentieri e dei rifugi 1:50.000 scale n.2 Valli di Lanzo e Moncenisio, and 1:25.000 scale n.110 Basse valli di Lanzo

== Bibliography ==
- Berutto, Giulio; Fornelli, Lino (1980). Alpi Graie meridionali. Guida dei Monti d'Italia (in Italian). Milano: CAI / TCI.
- Ceragioli, Filippo; Molino, Aldo (2006). "Rocca Maritano e Punta Lunella". Le più belle escursioni nelle valli di Lanzo (in Italian). Subiaco: Edizioni del Capricorno. ISBN 9788877073426.
- Marazzi, Sergio (2005). Atlante Orografico delle Alpi. SOIUSA (in Italian). Scarmagno: Priuli & Verlucca. ISBN 978-88-8068-273-8.
