= Bonzo, Piedmont =

Bonzo
- Frazione
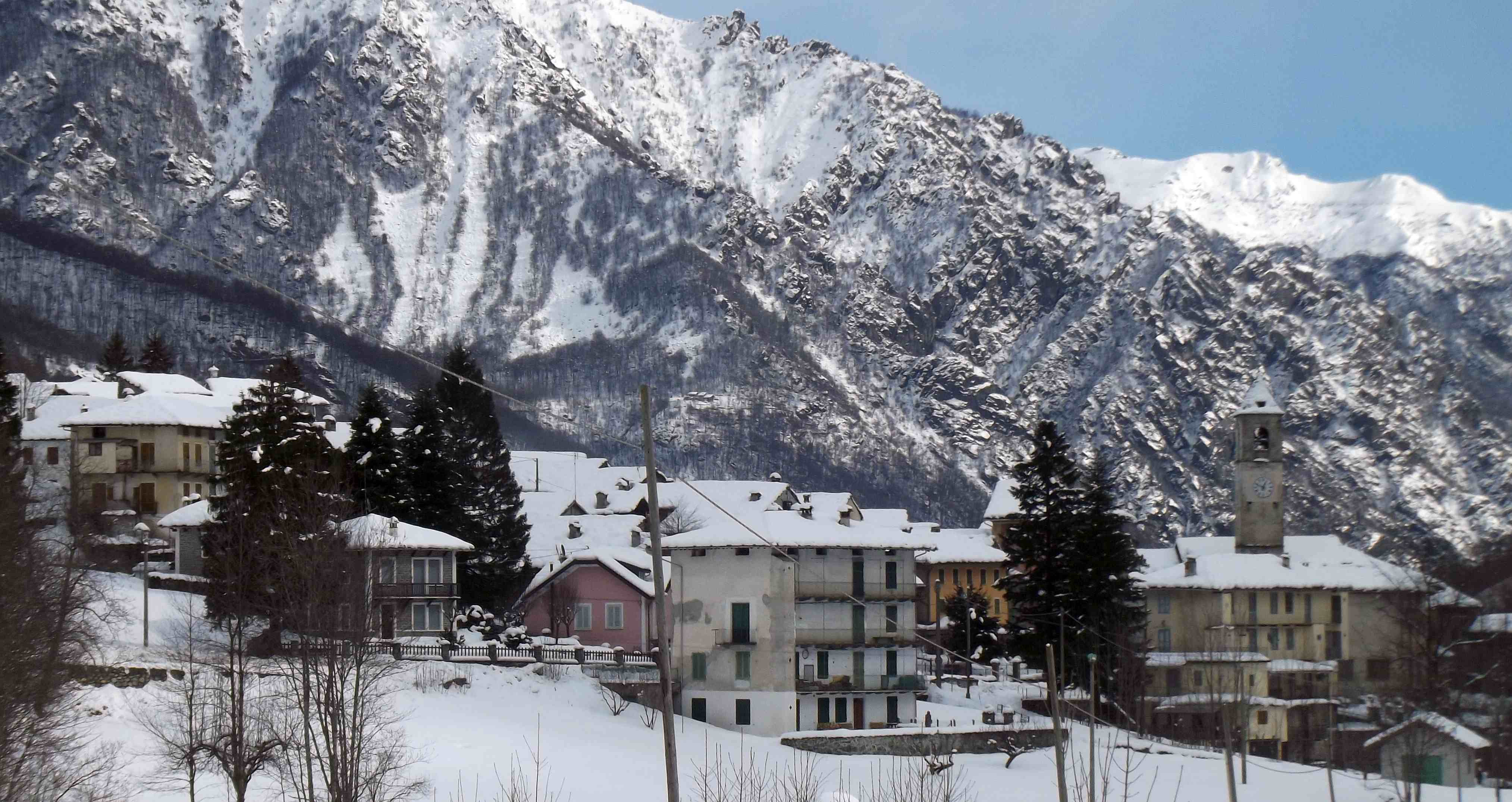
- Winter panorama

- Location of Bonzo in Italy
- Coordinates: 45°22′04″N 7°18′20″E
- Country: Italy
- Region: Piedmont
- Province: Turin (TO)
- Comune: Groscavallo
- Elevation: 973 m (3,192 ft)

Population (2001)
  - Total: 41
- Time zone: UTC+1 (CET)
  - Summer (DST): UTC+2 (CEST)
- Postal code: 10070
- Dialing code: (+39) 0123

Bonzo is a frazione (and a parish) of the municipality of Groscavallo, in Piedmont, northern Italy.

== Geography ==
Bonzo lies on the left side of the Stura di Valgrande, the north branch of the river Stura di Lanzo.

== History ==
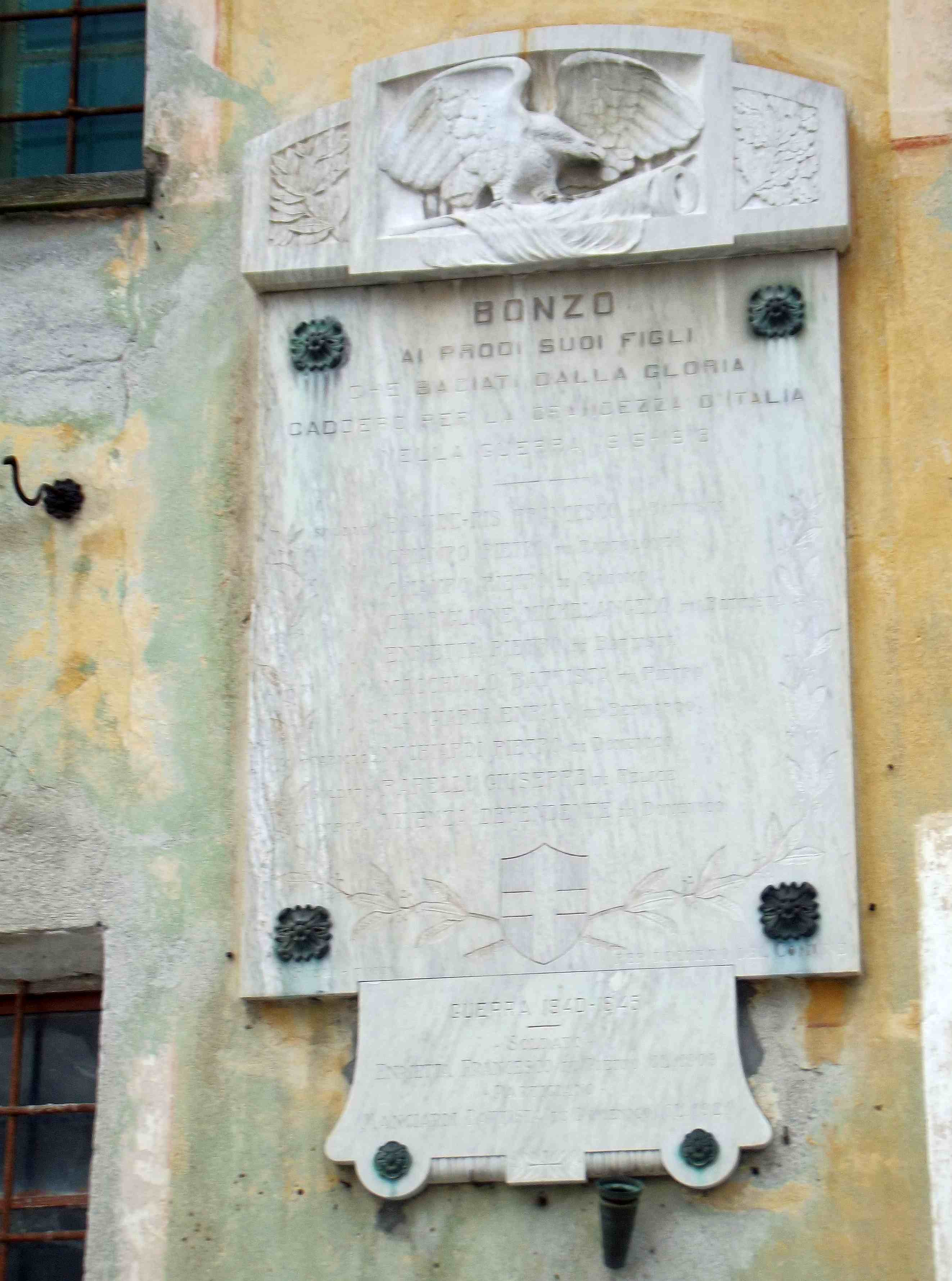
War memorial

At the beginning of the 18th century Bonzo, which earlier was part of the belongings of the Lanzo châtelain, was given as a fief to counts Valfrè from Bra. Bonzo counted 669 inhabitants in 1774 and 501 in 1855.

Most of the men during the winter used to move from the village in order to look for jobs in the Po plain and further.

Since 1927 Bonzo was a separate comune (municipality).

== Relevant buildings ==
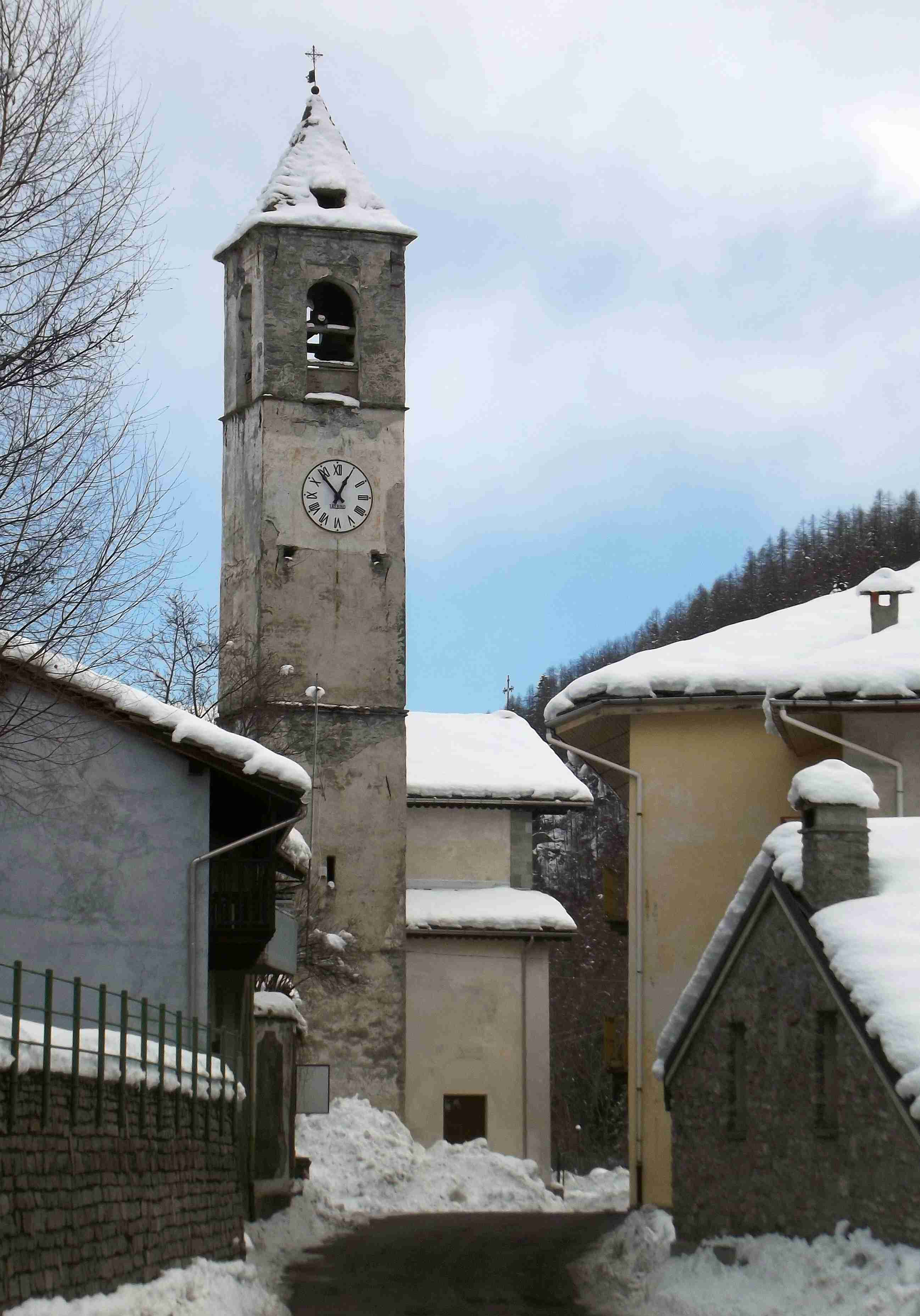
Church tower

- Chiesa della conversione di San Paolo. During the late 17th century it became a self-standing parish after a period of dependence from Chialamberto church. Located in the centre of the village, its bell tower is 23 m high.
- Cappella di San Giovanni Battista. Located in the lowest part of Bonzo, it was mentioned in a report concerning a 1674 visit of the archbishop of Turin to the Lanzo Valleys. It contains some frescos and ancient pieces of furniture.
