= Monte Civrari =

Mountain in Italy

- Punta Imperatoria
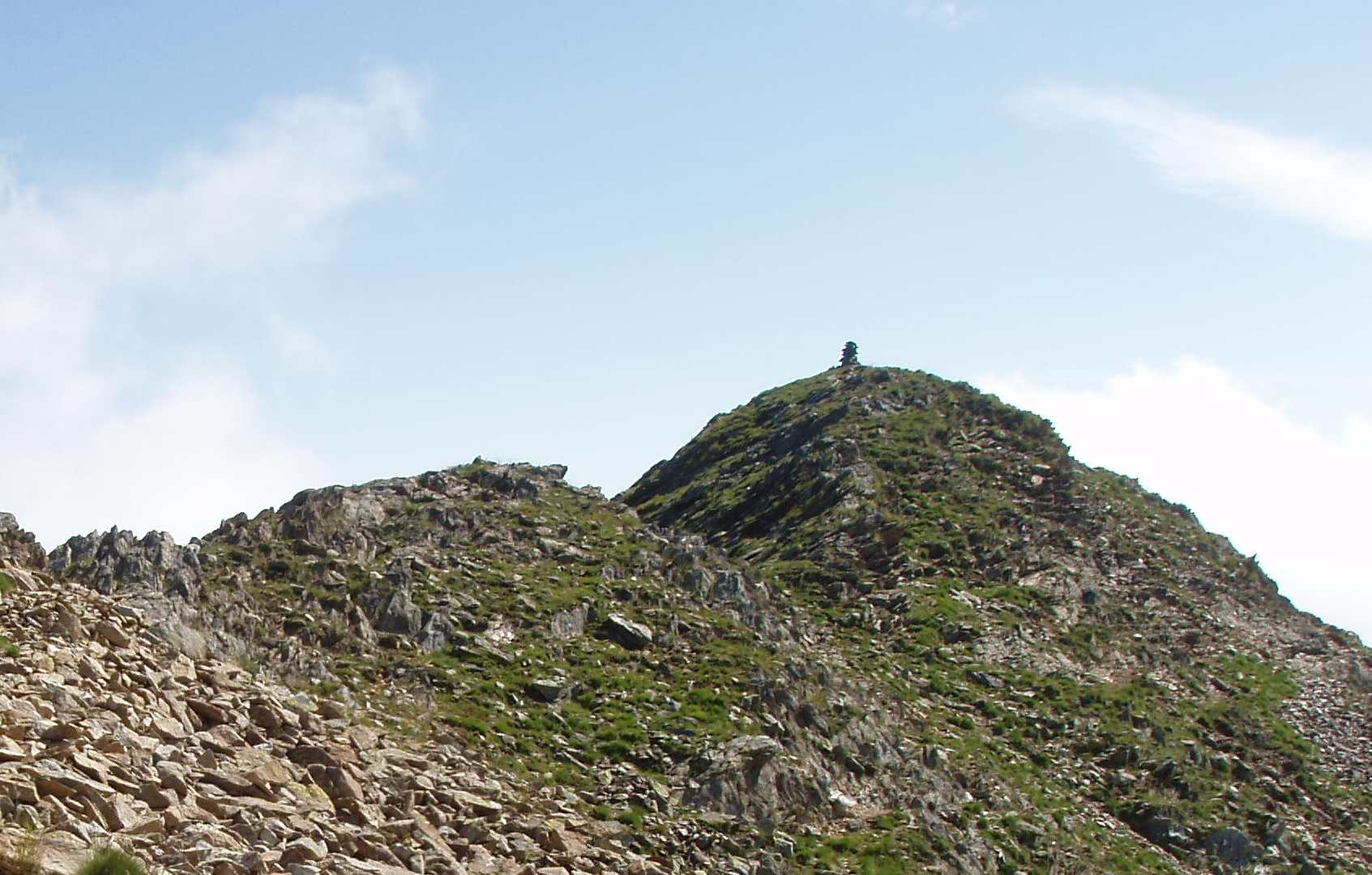
- The summit of Monte Civrari (Punta Imperatoria)

Highest point
- Prominence: 414 m (1,358 ft)
- Isolation: 4.26 km (2.65 mi)
- Listing: Alpine mountains 2000-2499 m
- Coordinates: 45°11′31″N 7°19′39″E

Geography
- Location within Alps
- Location: Province of Turin, Italy
- Parent range: Graian Alps

Climbing
- Easiest route: Hiking from Colle del Colombardo or Niquidetto

The Monte Civrari is a mountain of the Graian Alps, with an elevation of 2,302 m.

== Etymology ==
The name Civrari means goats’ mountain (from ciavra, the Piedmontese word for goat). There is strong evidence that the area was in the past widely exploited for goat grazing.

== Geography ==
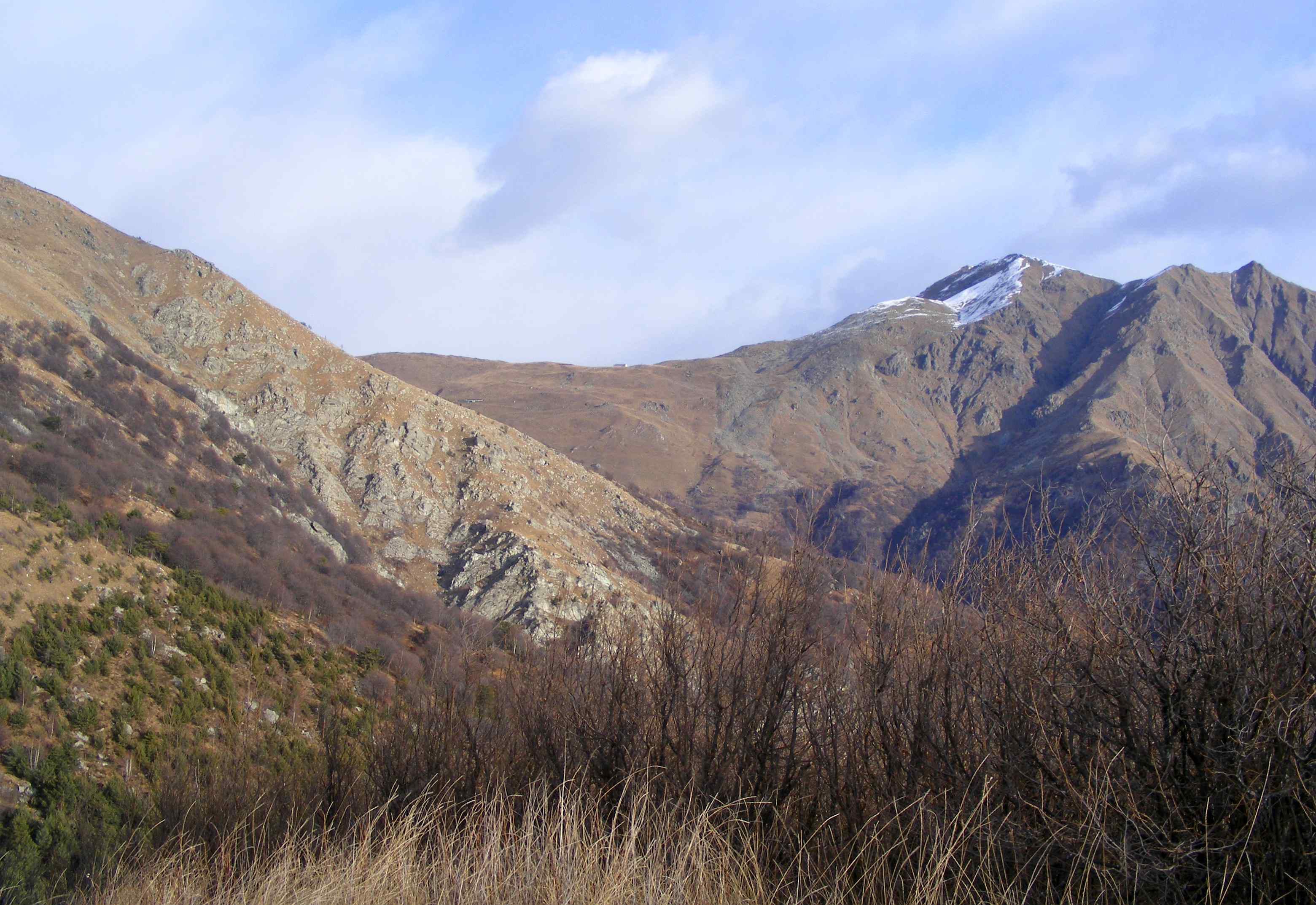
SW slopes from Truc Castelletto (Condove)

The Civrari is not an isolated peak but a small massif. Its main summit is named Punta Imperatoria; in the massif are also located Torretta del Prete (2.264 m), Punta della Croce (2.236 m), Monte Rognoso (1.952 m) and, in a wider sense, also the Punte di Costafiorita and Punta Sourela (1.777 m). On the summit of Punta Imperatoria stands a trigpoint of the IGM named Monte Civrari (code 055037).

Punta Imperatoria is located slightly N of the ridge dividing Val Susa from Val di Viù, and stands on the border between the comunes of Viù and Lemie (both in the Metropolitan City of Turin).

=== SOIUSA classification ===
According to the SOIUSA (International Standardized Mountain Subdivision of the Alps) the mountain can be classified in the following way:

- main part = Western Alps
- major sector = North Western Alps
- section = Graian Alps
- subsection = Southern Graian Alps
- supergroup = catena Rocciamelone-Charbonel
- group = gruppo del Rocciamelone
- subgroup = cresta Lunella-Arpone
- code = I/B-7.I-A.2.b

== Access to the summit ==
The easiest route for the summit is a footpath starting from Niquidetto or from the Colle del Colombardo, a mountain pass which connects Viù and Condove and can be reached with 4wd vehicles.

== Maps ==
- Italian official cartography (Istituto Geografico Militare - IGM); on-line version: www.pcn.minambiente.it
- I.G.C. (Istituto Geografico Centrale): Carta dei sentieri e dei rifugi 1:50.000 scale n.2 Valli di Lanzo e Moncenisio, and 1:25.000 scale n.110 Basse valli di Lanzo

== Bibliography ==
- Alpi Graie meridionali, Giulio Berutto e Lino Fornelli, Guida dei Monti d'Italia; Club Alpino Italiano, 1980

== Image gallery ==
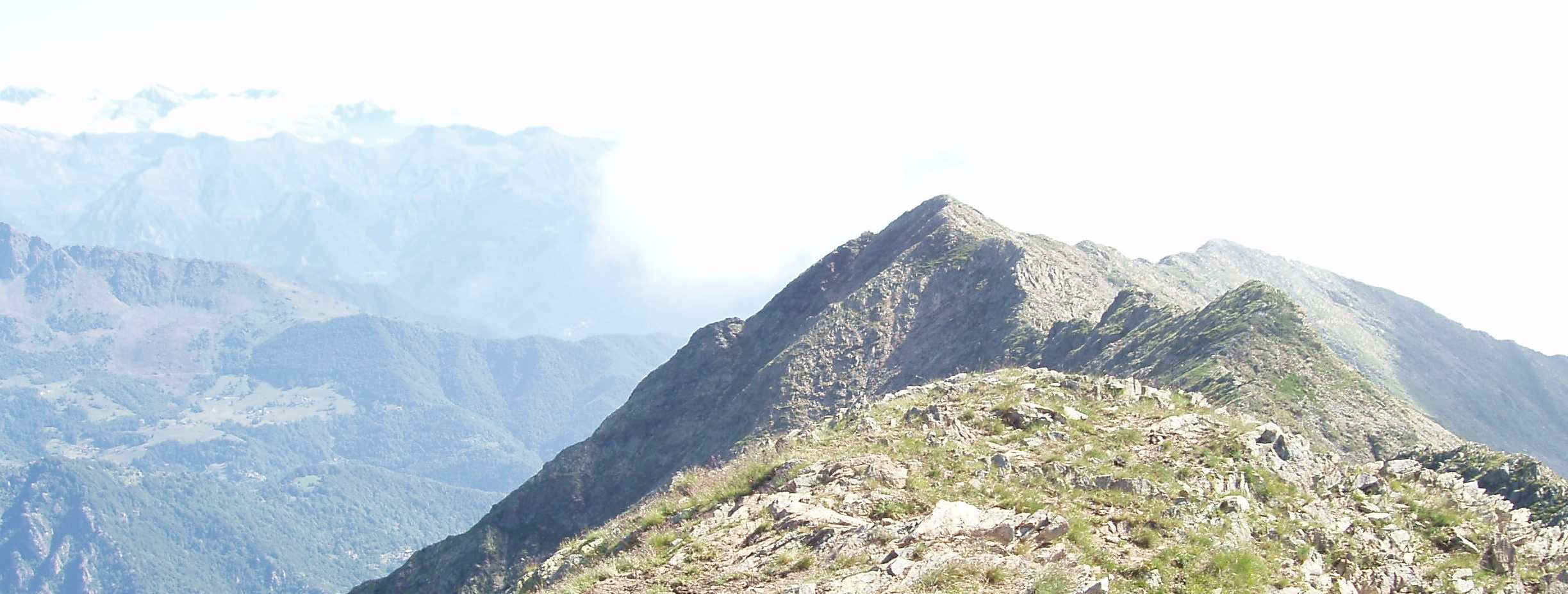
Torretta del Prete

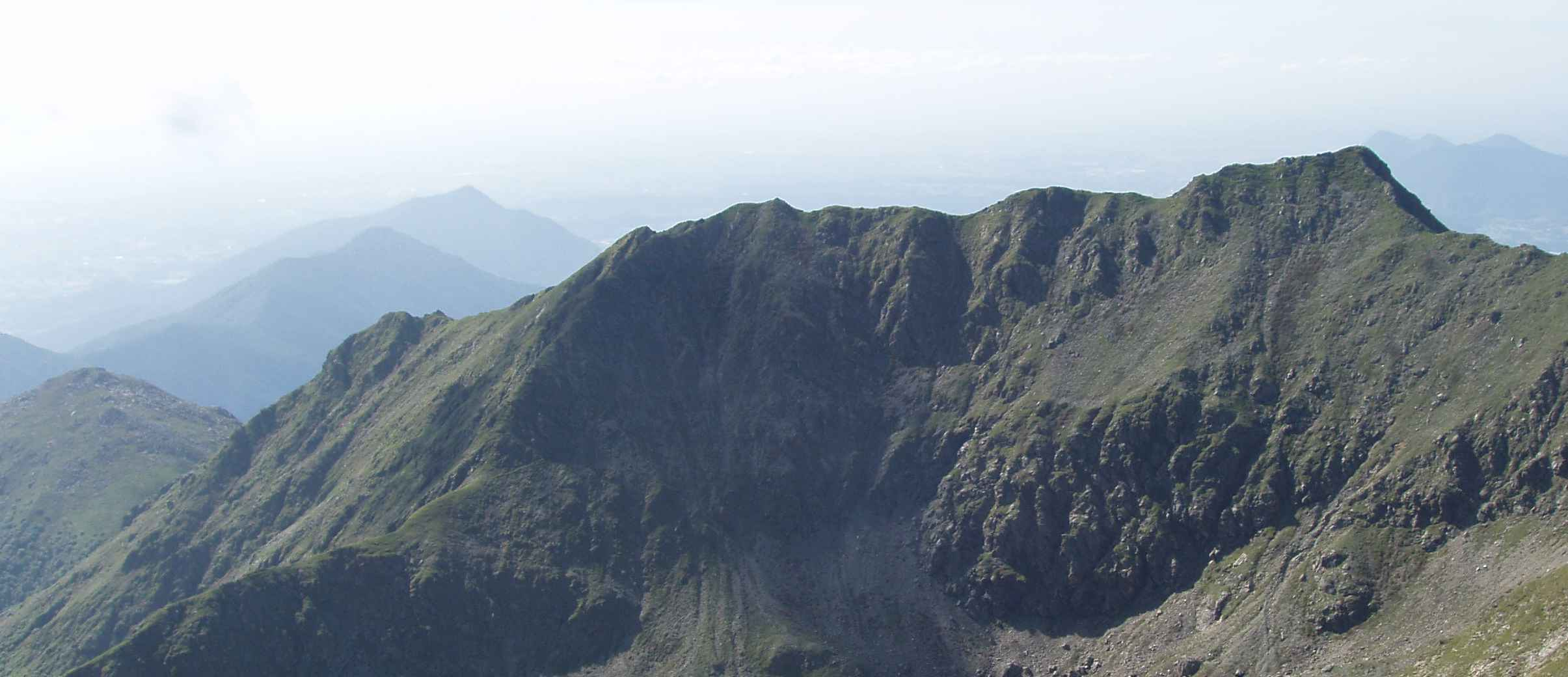
Punta della Croce

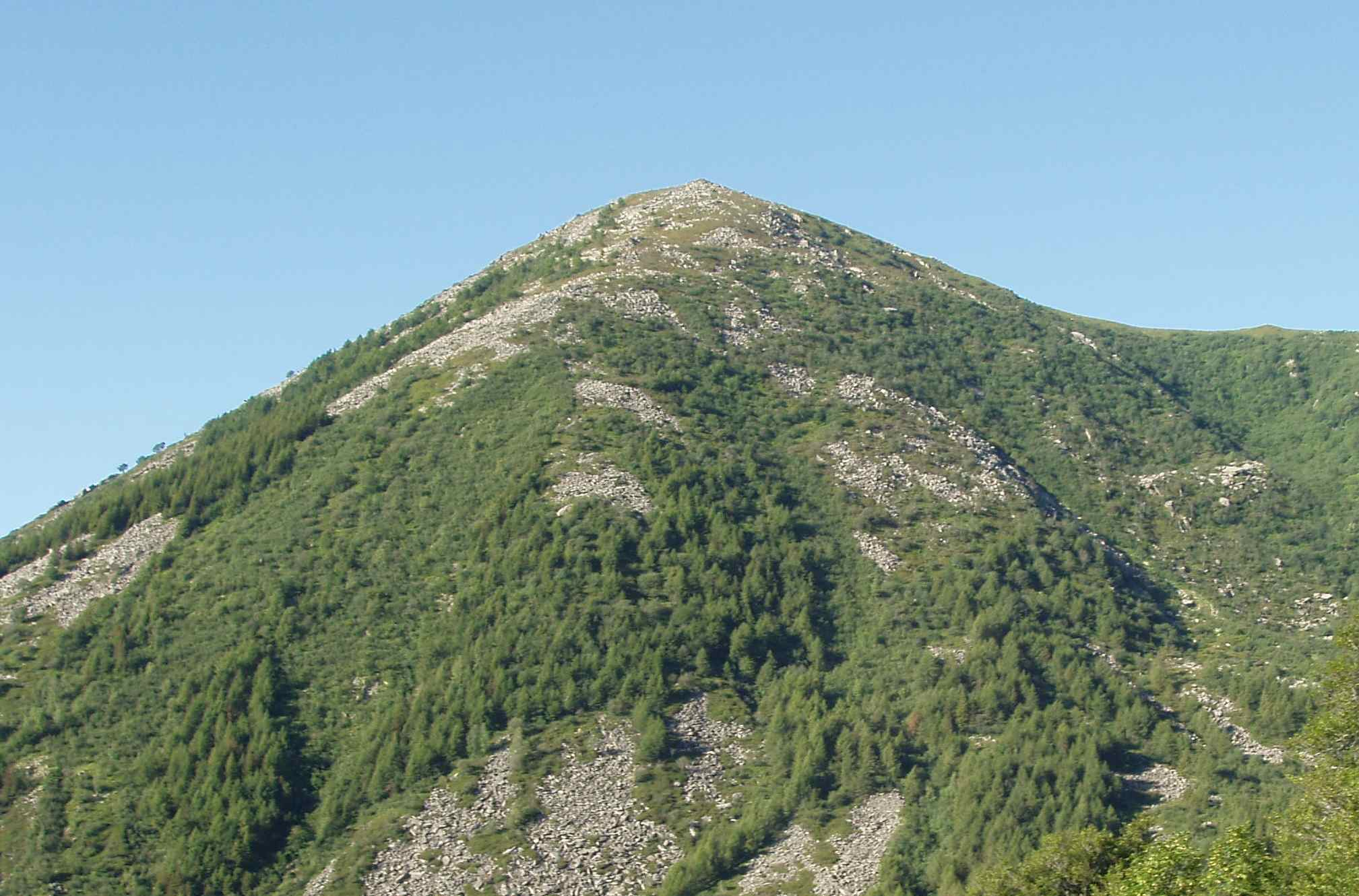
Monte Rognoso

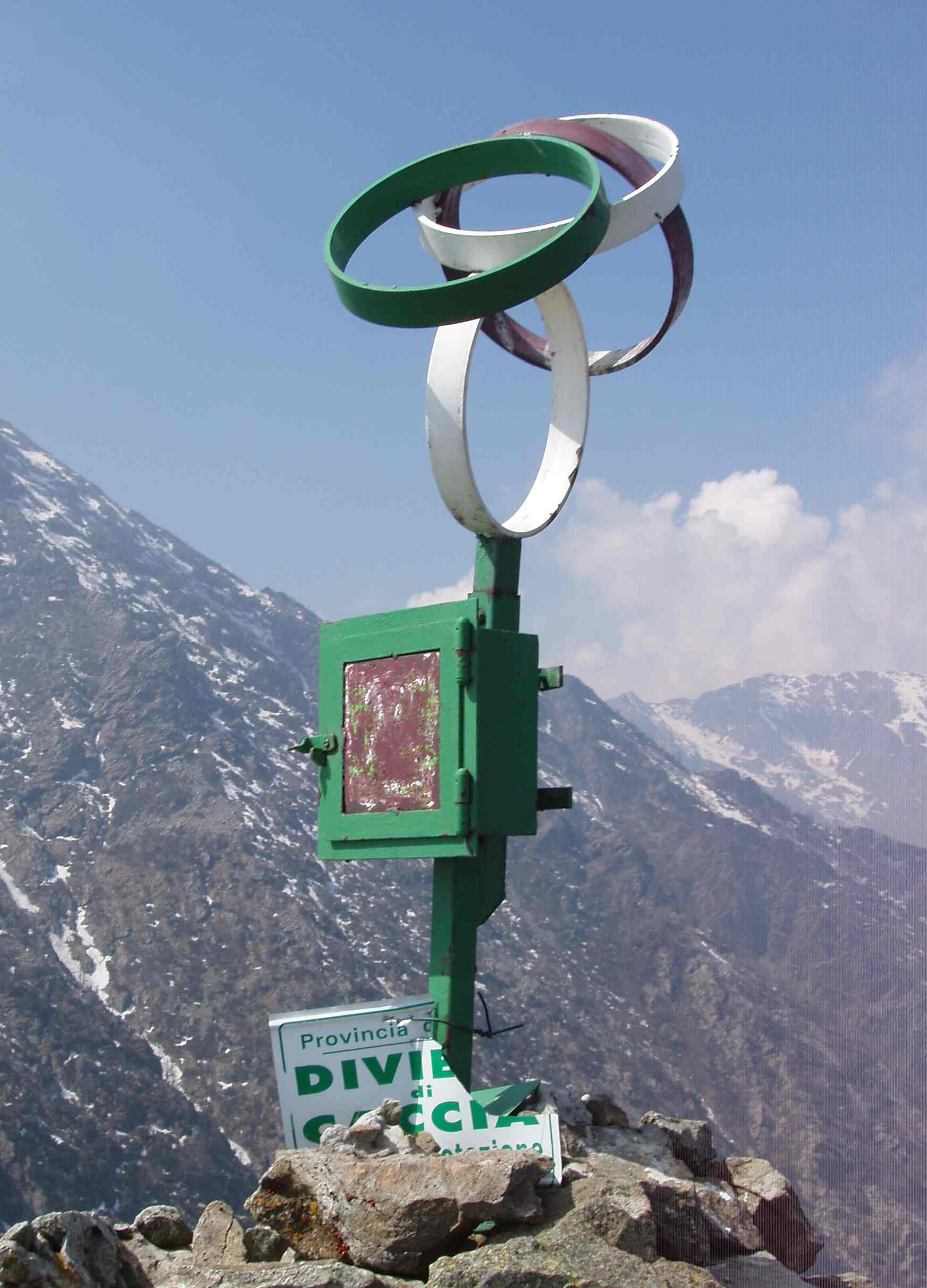
Punta Sourela summit

== See also ==
Media related to Monte Civrari at Wikimedia Commons
