= Groscavallo =

Groscavallo Gròsscaval (Piedmontese) Gruskavà (Arpitan)
- Comune
- Comune di Groscavallo
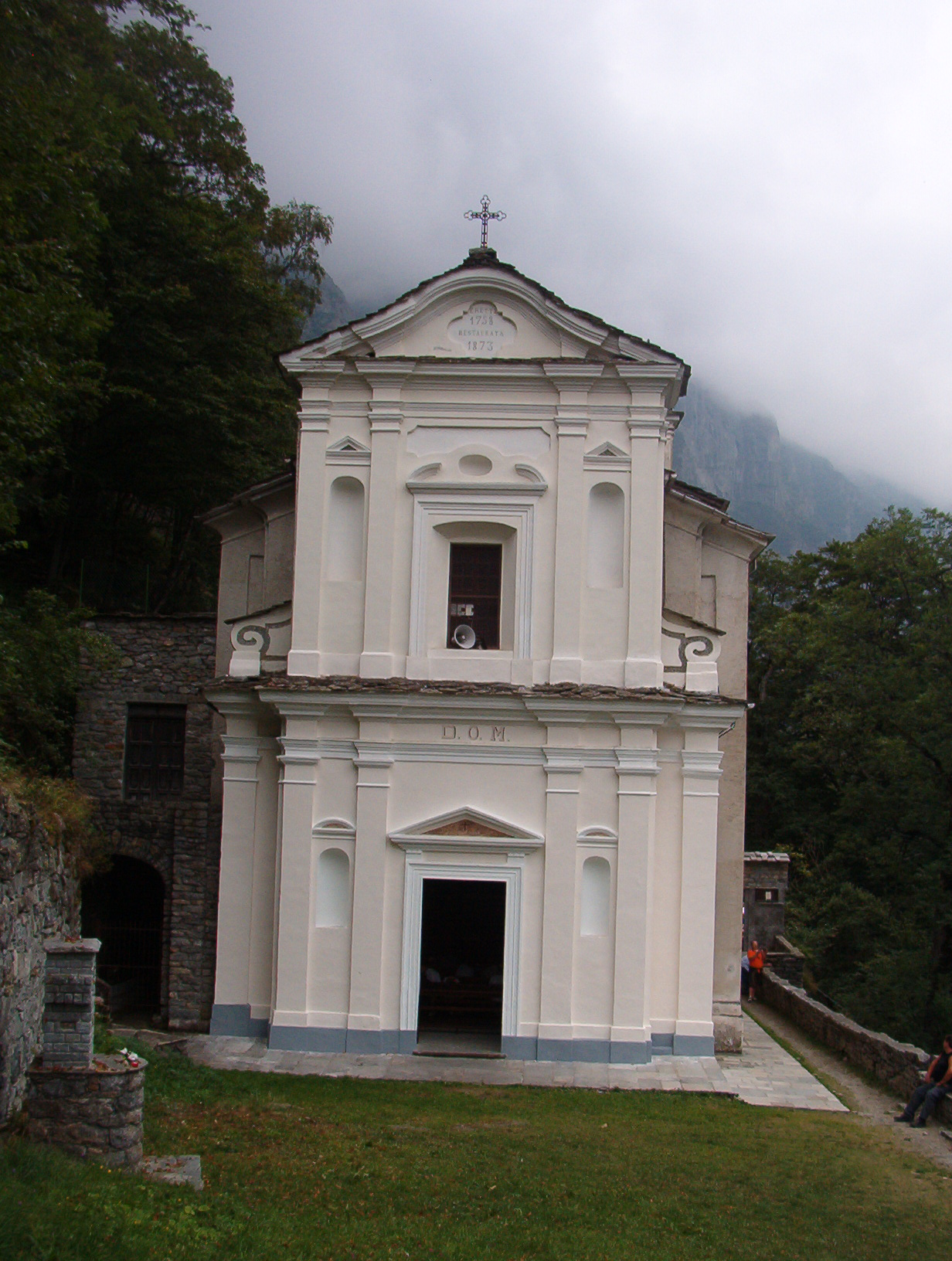
- Sanctuary of Nostra Signora di Loreto, in the frazione of Forno Alpi Graie.

- Location within Italy Location within Piedmont
- Coordinates: 45°22′N 7°16′E
- Country: Italy
- Region: Piedmont
- Metropolitan city: Turin (TO)
- Frazioni: Alboni, Bonzo, Borgo, Campo Pietra, Forno Alpi Graie, Migliere, Pialpetta, Ricchiardi, Rivotti

Government
  - Mayor: Maria Cristina Cerutti Dafarra

Area
  - Total: 93.0 km^{2} (35.9 sq mi)
- Elevation: 1,110 m (3,640 ft)

Population (31 December 2014)
  - Total: 204
  - Density: 2.19/km^{2} (5.68/sq mi)
- Demonym: Groscavallesi
- Time zone: UTC+1 (CET)
  - Summer (DST): UTC+2 (CEST)
- Postal code: 10070
- Dialing code: 0123

Groscavallo (Piedmontese: Gròsscaval, Arpitan: Gruskavà) is a comune (municipality) in the Metropolitan City of Turin in the Italian region Piedmont, located in one of the Valli di Lanzo about 50 kilometres (31 mi) northwest of Turin, on the border with France. The Levanne massif is located nearby.

The communal seat is in the frazione of Pialpetta. Groscavallo borders the following municipalities: Ala di Stura, Balme, Bonneval-sur-Arc (France), Ceres, Ceresole Reale, Chialamberto, and Noasca.
