= Balme =

Balme Bârmes (Arpitan)
- Comune
- Comune di Balme
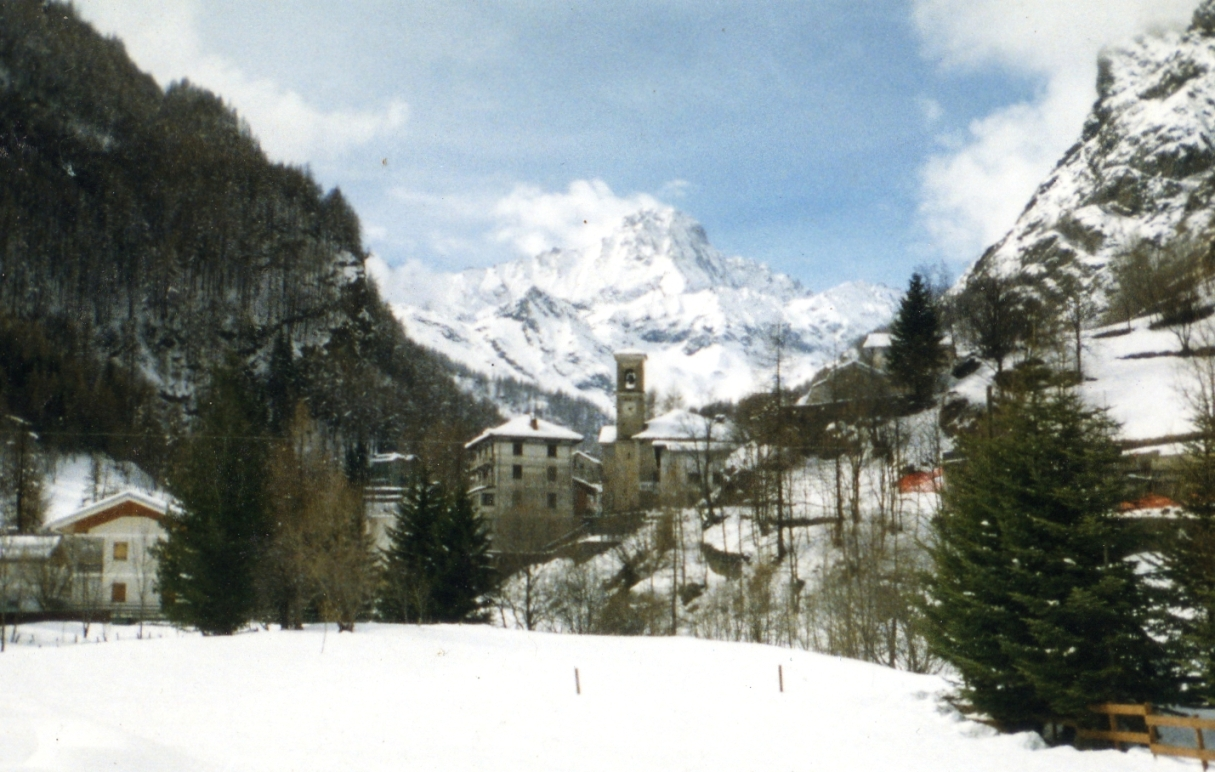

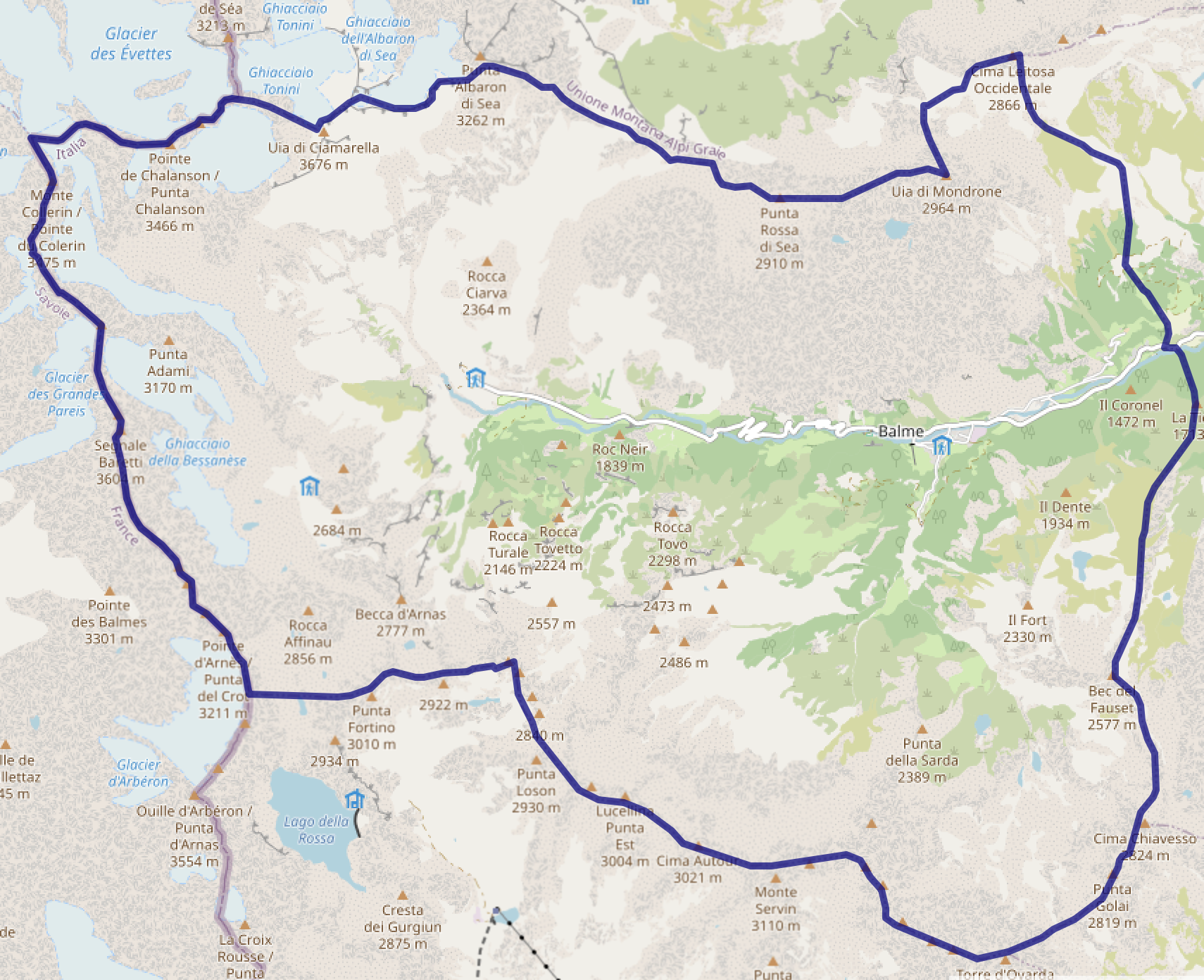
- OSM map of Balme.

- Location within Italy Location within Piedmont
- Coordinates: 45°18′N 7°13′E
- Country: Italy
- Region: Piedmont
- Metropolitan city: Turin (TO)
- Frazioni: Chialambertetto, Molera

Government
  - Mayor: Giovanni Battista Castagneri

Area
  - Total: 62.71 km^{2} (24.21 sq mi)
- Elevation: 1,432 m (4,698 ft)

Population (30 November 2017)
  - Total: 111
  - Density: 1.77/km^{2} (4.58/sq mi)
- Demonym: Balmesi
- Time zone: UTC+1 (CET)
  - Summer (DST): UTC+2 (CEST)
- Postal code: 10070
- Dialing code: 0123
- Patron saint: Holy Trinity
- Saint day: First Sunday after Pentecost
- Website: Official website

Balme (Arpitan: Bârmes) is a comune (municipality) in the Metropolitan City of Turin in the Italian region of Piedmont. It is located in the Graian Alps area, in one of the Valli di Lanzo, the about 45 kilometres (28 mi) northwest of Turin, on the border with France.

Balme borders the following municipalities: Ala di Stura, Bessans (France), Bonneval-sur-Arc (France), Groscavallo, Lemie, and Usseglio.
