= Locana =

Locana Locan-a (Piedmontese) Lukënna (Arpitan)
- Comune
- Comune di Locana
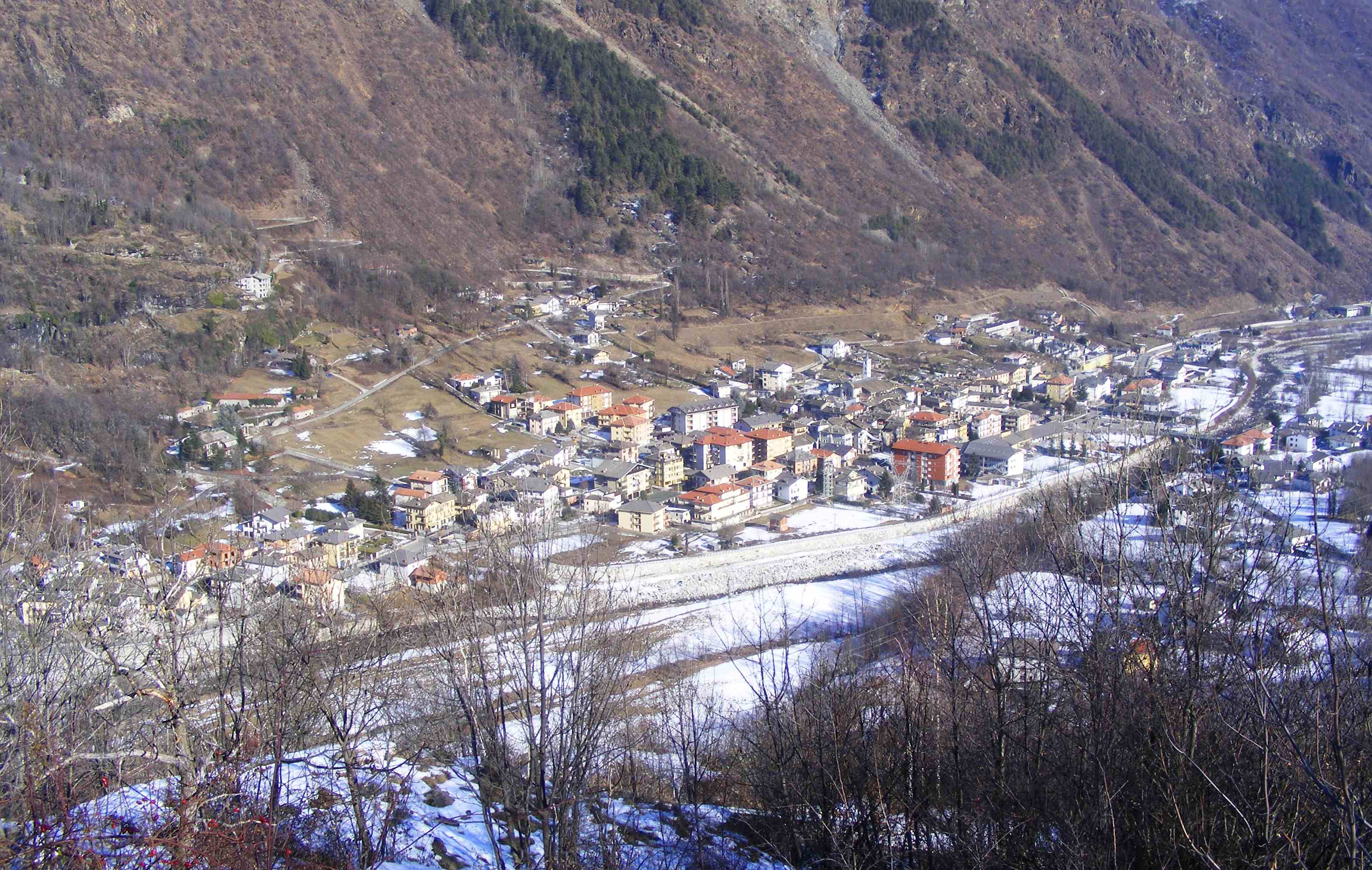

- Coat of arms

- Location within Italy Location within Piedmont
- Coordinates: 45°25′N 7°28′E
- Country: Italy
- Region: Piedmont
- Metropolitan city: Turin (TO)
- Frazioni: Rosone, Boschietto, Bosco, Fornolosa, Gavie, Gurgo, Montigli, Nusiglie, Praie, Serlone

Government
  - Mayor: Giovanni Bruno Mattiet

Area
  - Total: 132.52 km^{2} (51.17 sq mi)
- Elevation: 613 m (2,011 ft)

Population (30 September 2017)
  - Total: 1,453
  - Density: 10.96/km^{2} (28.40/sq mi)
- Demonym: Locanesi
- Time zone: UTC+1 (CET)
  - Summer (DST): UTC+2 (CEST)
- Postal code: 10080
- Dialing code: 0124
- Website: Official website

Locana (Piedmontese: Locan-a, Arpitan: Lukënna) is a comune (municipality) in the Metropolitan City of Turin in the Italian region Piedmont, located about 45 kilometres (28 mi) northwest of Turin in the Orco Valley. In the early 1900s the town had about 7,000 residents. As of 2019 the population declined to 1,500.

Locana borders the following municipalities: Cogne, Ronco Canavese, Noasca, Ribordone, Sparone, Chialamberto, Cantoira, Corio, Monastero di Lanzo and Coassolo Torinese. The comune is part of the Gran Paradiso National Park, housing a series of small alpine lakes and glaciers; peaks in the area include the Torre del Gran San Pietro (3,692 m). The Lake of Ceresole is also located nearby.

In 2019 the mayor, Giovanni Bruno Mattiet, announced that the municipality of Locana will pay families up to €9,000, (US$10,200) over a three-year period just for moving to the village. To qualify the families must have at least one child and a yearly income of €6,000. The goal is to stop the town from disappearing, since every year in town there are only 10 births but 40 deaths. The offer was first only for Italians or foreigners who already live in Italy, but the program was extended to also include foreigners living outside Italy.
