= Ceresole Reale =

Ceresole Reale Ceresòle (Piedmontese) Sérisoles (Arpitan)
- Comune
- Comune di Ceresole Reale
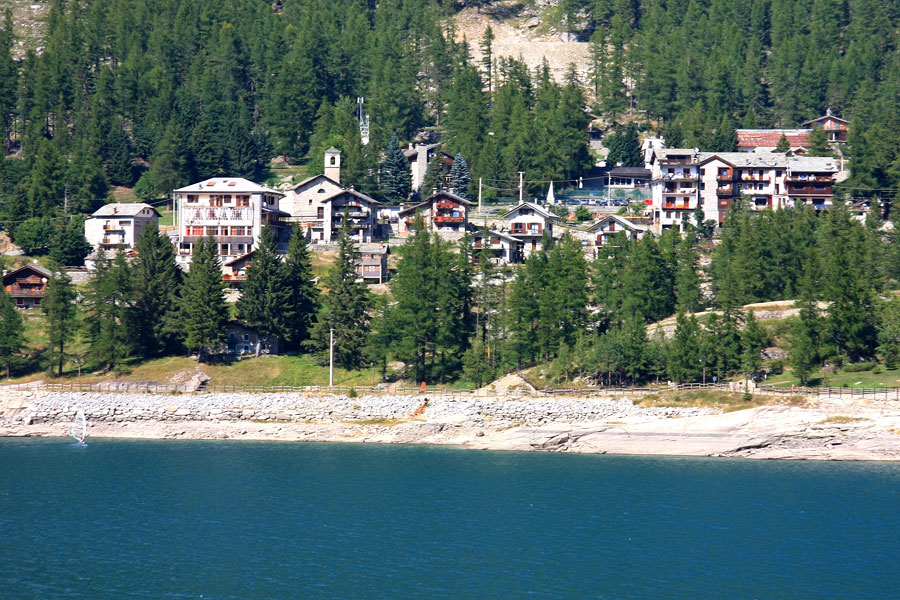

- Location within Italy Location within Piedmont
- Coordinates: 45°26′N 7°14′E
- Country: Italy
- Region: Piedmont
- Metropolitan city: Turin (TO)

Government
  - Mayor: Andrea Basolo

Area
  - Total: 99.82 km^{2} (38.54 sq mi)
- Elevation: 1,620 m (5,310 ft)

Population (1-1-2017)
  - Total: 161
  - Density: 1.61/km^{2} (4.18/sq mi)
- Demonym: Ceresolino(i)
- Time zone: UTC+1 (CET)
  - Summer (DST): UTC+2 (CEST)
- Postal code: 10080
- Dialing code: 0124
- Patron saint: St. Nicholas
- Website: Official website

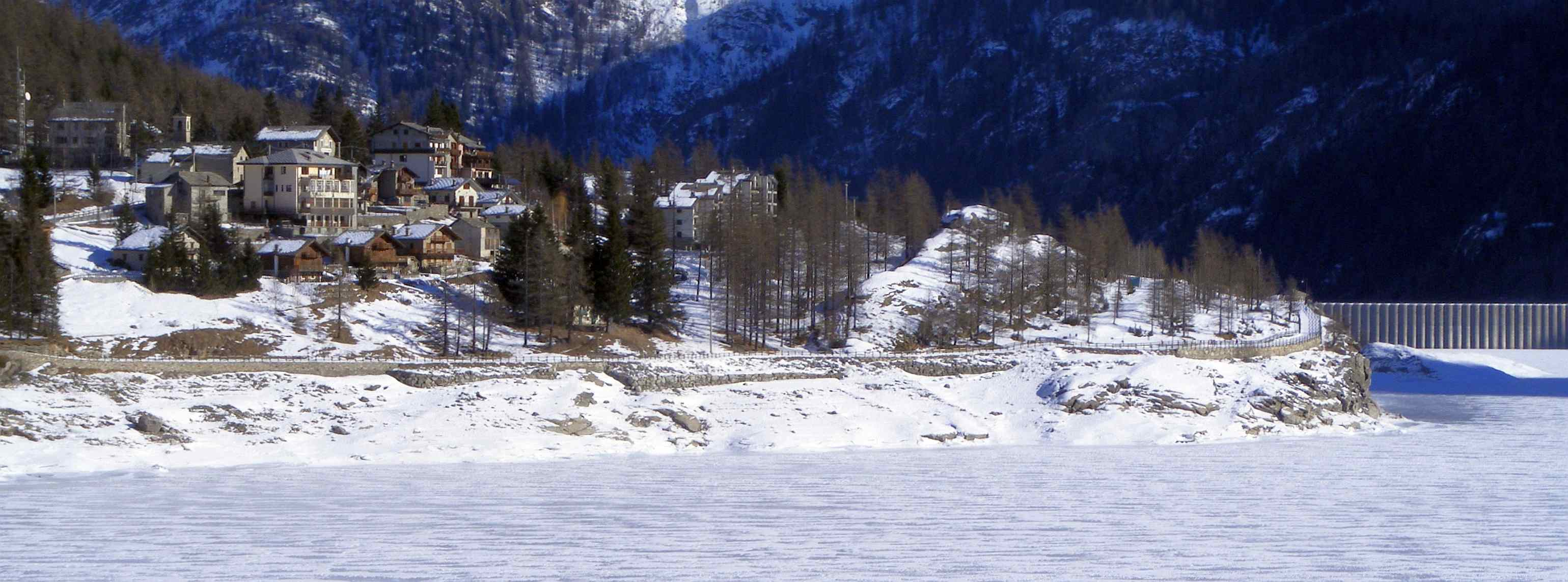
the town in winter

Ceresole Reale (Piedmontese: Ceresòle, Arpitan: Sérisoles) is a comune (municipality) in the Metropolitan City of Turin in the Italian region of Piedmont, located about 50 kilometres (31 mi) northwest of Turin in the Orco Valley, on the border with France.

Ceresole Reale borders the following municipalities: Bonneval-sur-Arc (France), Groscavallo, Noasca, Rhêmes-Notre-Dame, Val-d'Isère (France), and Valsavarenche. The communal territory is home to the Gran Paradiso National Park visitors center. The main structure is the large dam, built in 1925–31 by A.E.M. (Turin's electrical authority): this formed the Lago di Ceresole (lake of Ceresole), which is now the town's main tourist attraction.

Ceresole was the location of the ending cliffhanger scene in the 1969 film The Italian Job.

The adjective Reale meaning 'royal' was conferred to the municipality because it hosted the royal hunting pavilions of the House of Savoy. It was therefore allowed to use the royal shield and the royal crown as the Commune's coat of arms. The only other commune that was allowed this privilege was Venaria Reale, as it hosted another hunting reserve and a royal palace of the Savoyard kings.
