= Noasca =

Noasca Nuachi (Arpitan)
- Comune
- Comune di Noasca
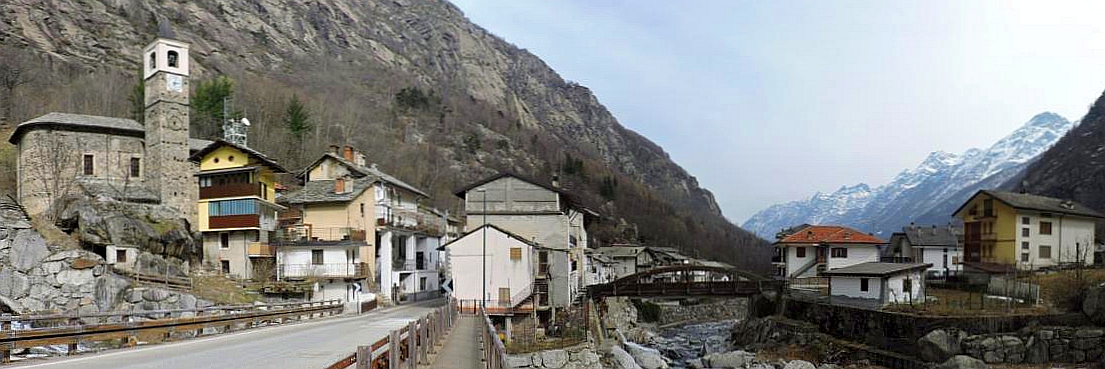

- Coat of arms

- Location within Italy Location within Piedmont
- Coordinates: 45°27′N 7°19′E
- Country: Italy
- Region: Piedmont
- Metropolitan city: Turin (TO)
- Frazioni: Gera, Gere Eredi, Balmarossa, Jerner, Jamoinin, Pianchette, Borno

Government
  - Mayor: Domenico Aimonino

Area
  - Total: 77.7 km^{2} (30.0 sq mi)
- Elevation: 1,065 m (3,494 ft)

Population (April 2024)
  - Total: 106
  - Density: 1.36/km^{2} (3.53/sq mi)
- Demonym: Noaschini
- Time zone: UTC+1 (CET)
  - Summer (DST): UTC+2 (CEST)
- Postal code: 10080
- Dialing code: 0124
- Website: Official website

Noasca (Arpitan: Nuachi) is a comune (municipality) in the Metropolitan City of Turin in the Italian region Piedmont, located about 50 kilometres (31 mi) northwest of Turin, in the Orco Valley.

Noasca borders the following municipalities: Cogne, Valsavarenche, Locana, Ceresole Reale, Groscavallo, and Chialamberto. It is part of the Gran Paradiso National Park. The main peak in the area is the Roc at 4,026 metres (13,209 ft).

The town has become famous for the Cingino Dam, which attracts goats that climb the steep dam to lick on the salty bricks.

In early July 2024, Noasca was hit by torrential rains and flooding, which was described by media as a “water bomb”.
