= Bessanèse =

Mountain on France and Italy border

- Uia di Bessanese
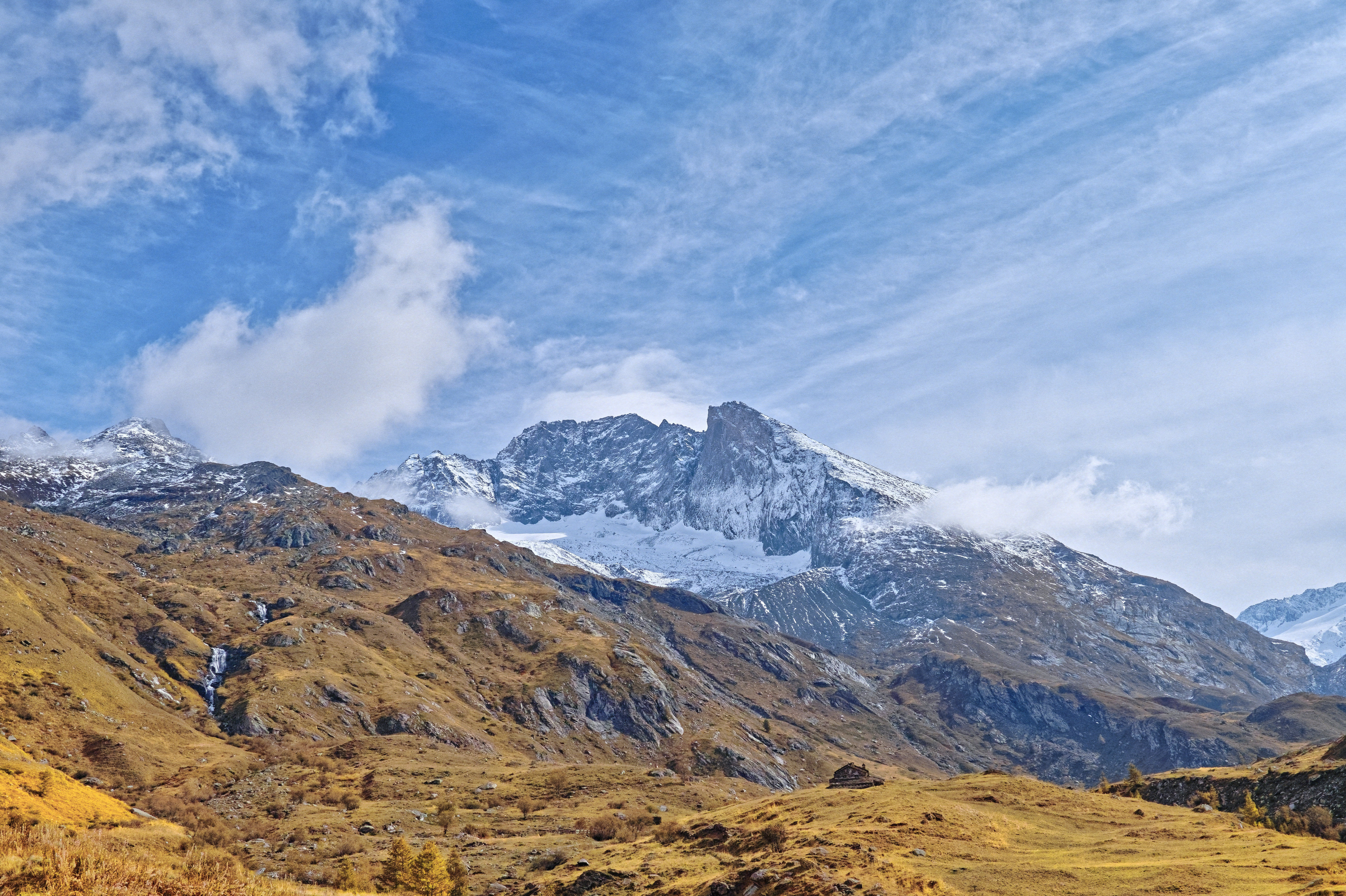
- Bessanèse

Highest point
- Elevation: 3,592 m (11,785 ft)
- Prominence: 394 m (1,293 ft)
- Isolation: 3.42 km (2.13 mi)
- Listing: Alpine mountains above 3000 m
- Coordinates: 45°11′N 7°04′E

Geography
- Location within Alps
- Location: Savoie, France and Piedmont, Italy
- Parent range: Graian Alps

Climbing
- First ascent: 31-8-1857 by Antonio Tonini

Bessanèse (Uia di Bessanese in Italian) (3,594 m) is a mountain of the Graian Alps on the France and Italy border.

== Features ==
Most famous on its Italian side, the mountain lies at the head of the Valli di Lanzo, around 30 km north of Turin. A popular hiking peak, its summit lies on a 150 m-long (490 ft) ridge.

== Bibliography ==
- Berutto, Giulio; Fornelli, Lino (1980). Alpi Graie Meridionali, Guida dei Monti d'Italia (in Italian). Milano: Club Alpino Italiano and Touring Club Italiano. ISBN 978-88-365-0077-2.

== Maps ==
- French official cartography (Institut géographique national - IGN); on-line version: www.geoportail.fr
- Istituto Geografico Centrale - Carta dei sentieri e dei rifugi 1:50.000 nr 2 Valli di Lanzo e Moncenisio
