= Ala di Stura =

Ala di Stura Ala (Piedmontese) Ala (Arpitan)
- Comune
- Comune di Ala di Stura
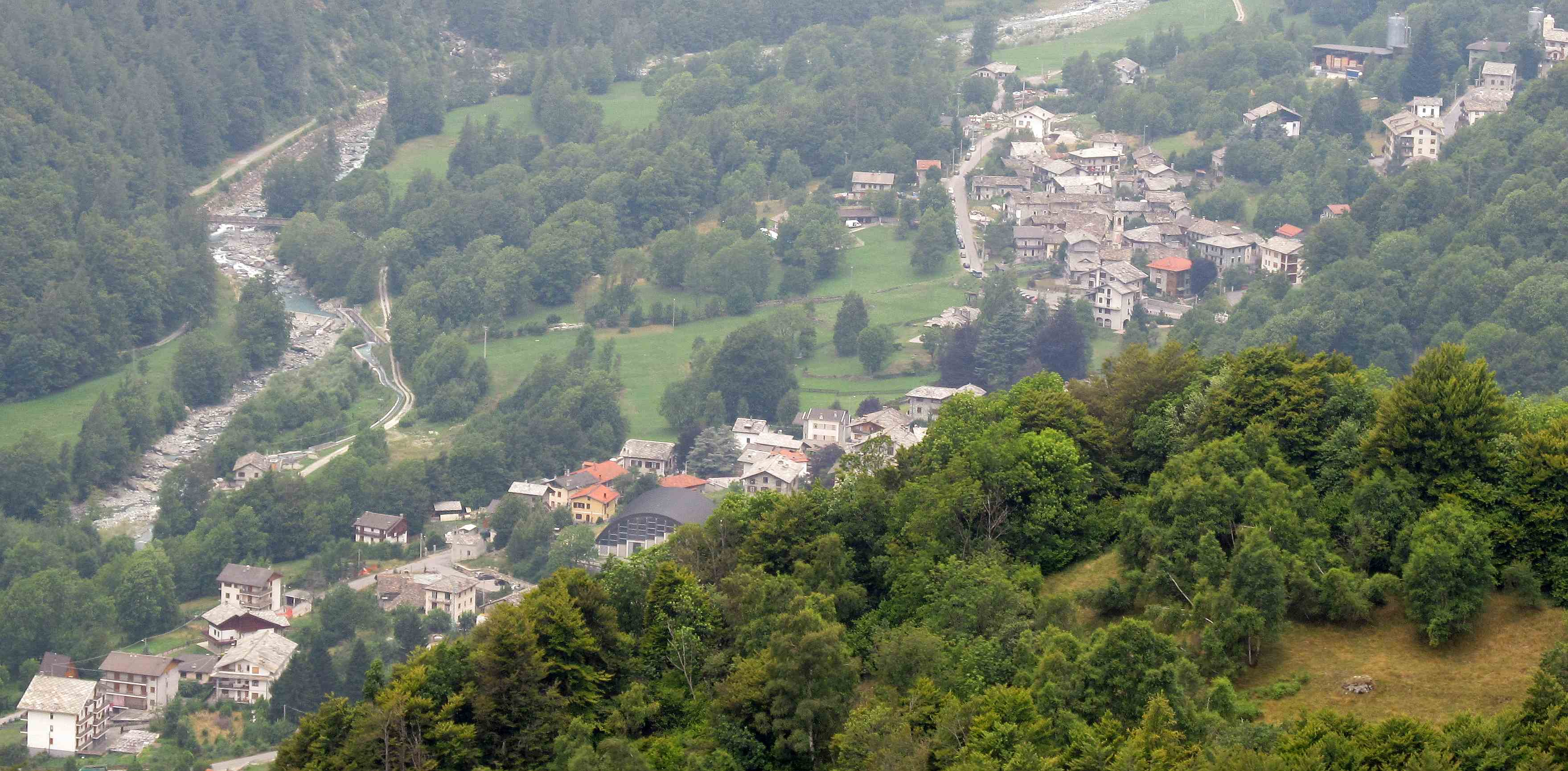

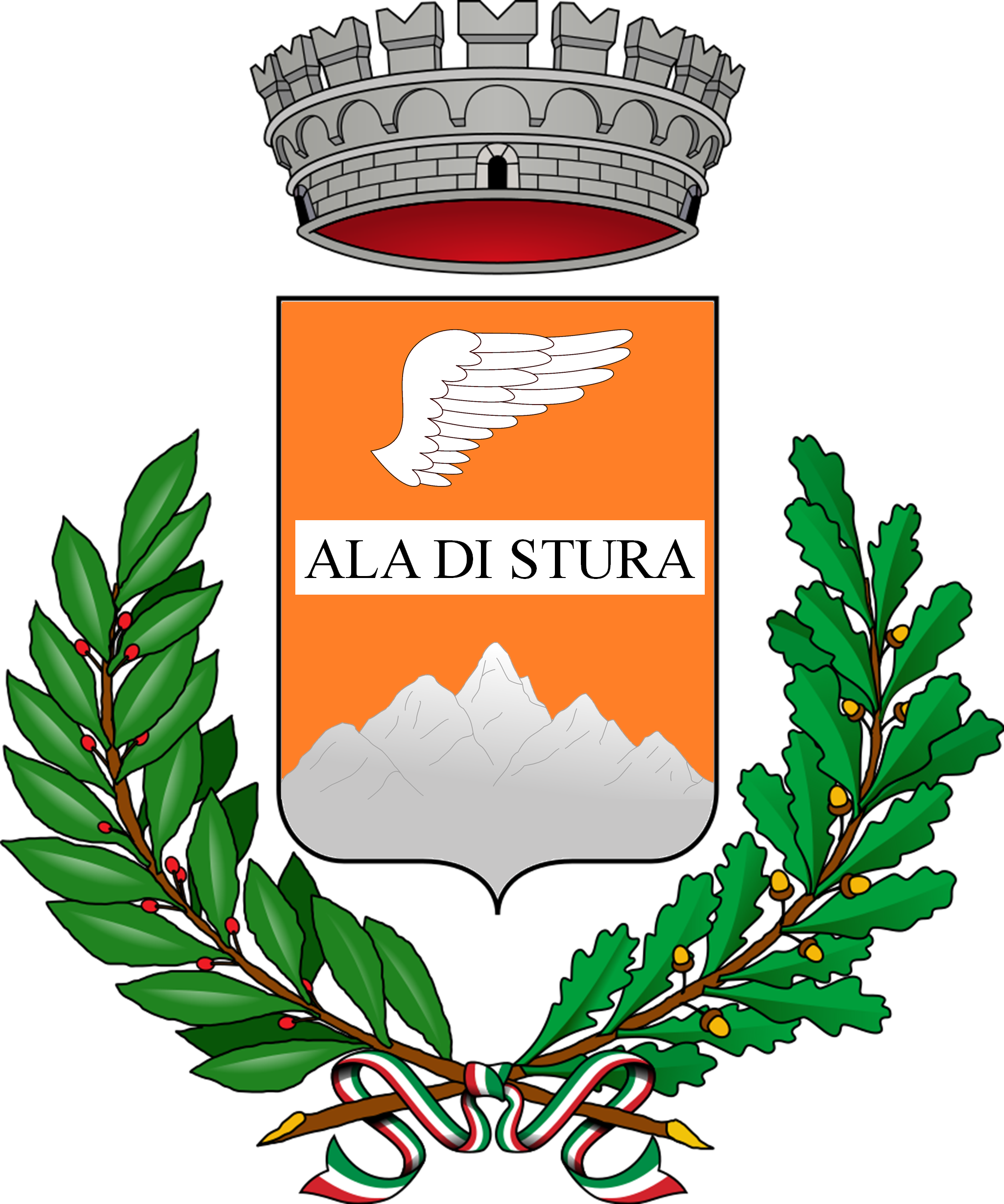
- Coat of arms

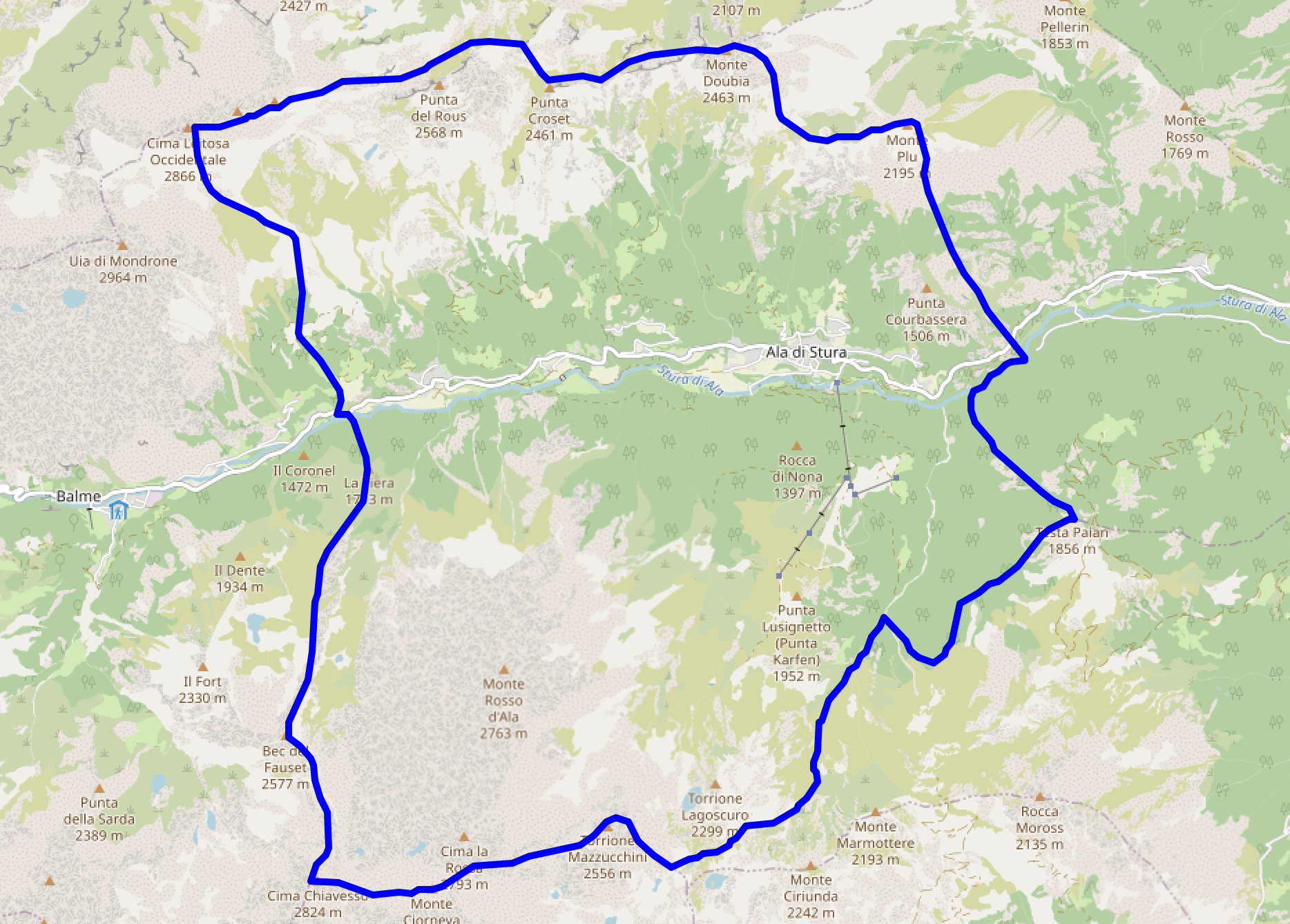

- Location of Ala di Stura in Italy Ala di Stura (Piedmont)
- Coordinates: 45°19′N 7°18′E
- Country: Italy
- Region: Piedmont
- Metropolitan city: Turin (TO)
- Frazioni: Cresto, Martassina, Mondrone, Pertusetto, Pian del Tetto, Villar

Government
  - Mayor: Mauro Garbano

Area
  - Total: 46.33 km^{2} (17.89 sq mi)
- Elevation: 1,080 m (3,540 ft)

Population (30 November 2017)
  - Total: 456
  - Density: 9.84/km^{2} (25.5/sq mi)
- Demonym: Alesi
- Time zone: UTC+1 (CET)
  - Summer (DST): UTC+2 (CEST)
- Postal code: 10070
- Dialing code: 0123
- Patron saint: St. Gratus
- Saint day: 4 September
- Website: Official website

Ala di Stura (Piedmontese and Franco-Provençal: Ala) is a comune (municipality) in the Metropolitan City of Turin in the Italian region Piedmont, located in one of the Valli di Lanzo about 40 kilometres (25 mi) northwest of Turin.

Ala di Stura borders the following municipalities: Groscavallo, Chialamberto, Ceres, Balme, Mezzenile, and Lemie.
