= Lago di Ceresole =

Lake in Piedmont, Italy

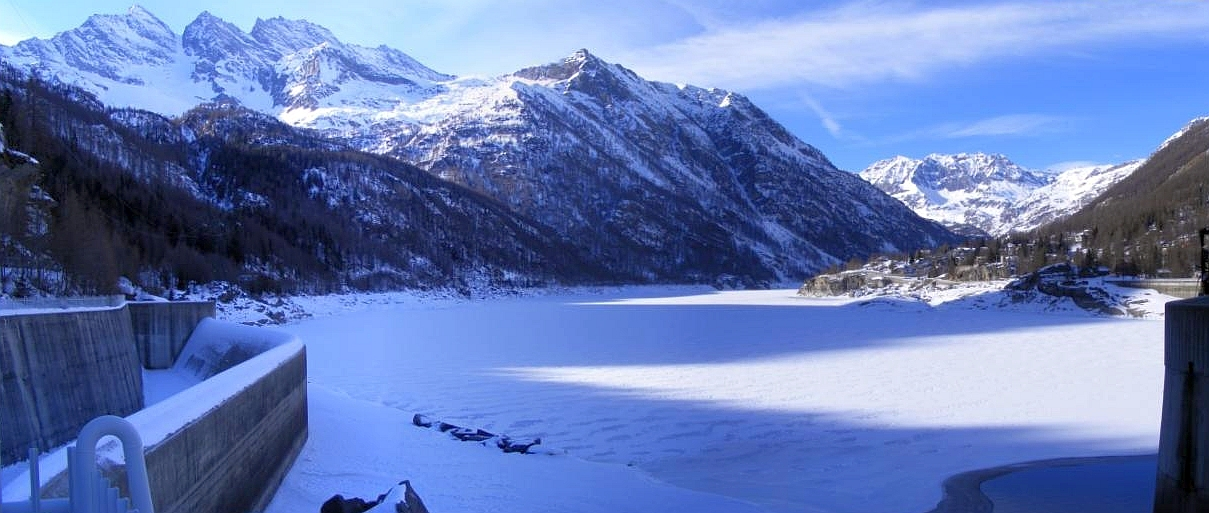
- Winter panorama from the dam

- Location within Piedmont
- Location: Province of Turin, Piedmont
- Coordinates: 45.430°N 7.228°E
- Primary inflows: Orco
- Primary outflows: Orco
- Catchment area: 8.89 km^{2} (3.43 sq mi)
- Basin countries: Italy
- Max. length: 3.2 km (2.0 mi)
- Max. width: 0.75 km (0.47 mi)
- Surface area: 1.58 km^{2} (0.61 sq mi)
- Average depth: 23.2 m (76 ft)
- Max. depth: 44.7 m (147 ft)
- Water volume: c. 35×10^{6} m^{3} (28,000 acre⋅ft)
- Surface elevation: 1,556 m (5,105 ft)
- Islands: none

Lago di Ceresole is an artificial lake in the Province of Turin, Piedmont, northern Italy. The lake was created in 1925-1931 when A.E.M. (now Iren), Turin's electricity authority, built a dam with a hydroelectric plant. The site is located in what is now the comune of Ceresole Reale.
