= Ceres, Piedmont =

Ceres Céres (Piedmontese) Séres (Arpitan)
- Comune
- Comune di Ceres
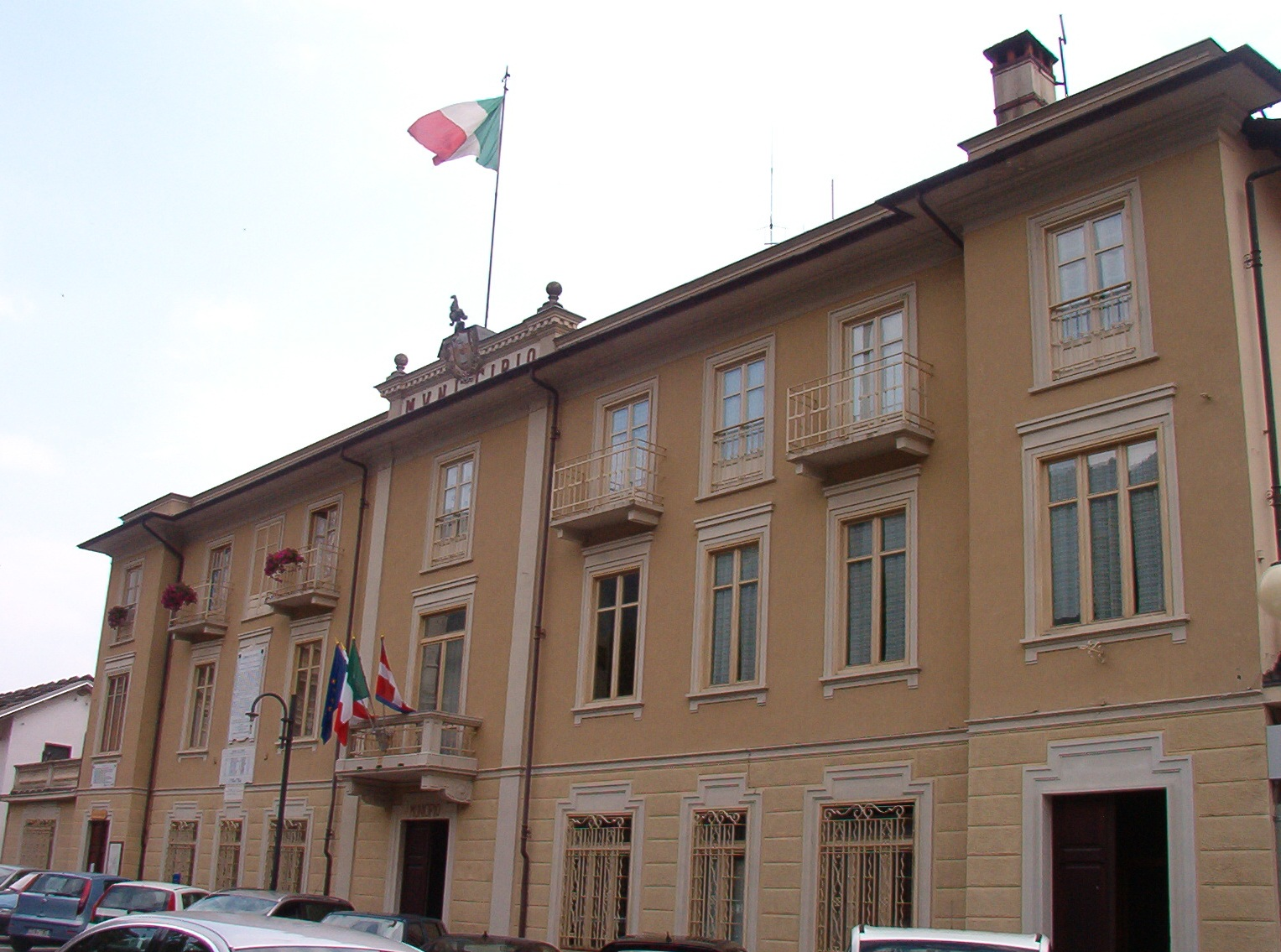

- Coat of arms

- Location within Italy Location within Piedmont
- Coordinates: 45°19′N 7°23′E
- Country: Italy
- Region: Piedmont
- Metropolitan city: Turin (TO)

Government
  - Mayor: Davide Eboli

Area
  - Total: 28.05 km^{2} (10.83 sq mi)
- Elevation: 704 m (2,310 ft)

Population (1-1-2017)
  - Total: 1,041
  - Density: 37.11/km^{2} (96.12/sq mi)
- Demonym: Ceresino(i)
- Time zone: UTC+1 (CET)
  - Summer (DST): UTC+2 (CEST)
- Postal code: 10070
- Dialing code: 0123

Ceres (Piedmontese: Céres, Arpitan: Séres) is a comune (municipality) in the Metropolitan City of Turin in the Italian region Piedmont, located about 35 kilometres (22 mi) northwest of Turin.

Its train station is the terminus of the Turin–Ceres railway service.

Ceres borders the following municipalities: Groscavallo, Chialamberto, Cantoira, Monastero di Lanzo, Ala di Stura, Mezzenile, and Pessinetto.
