= Chialamberto =

Chialamberto Cialambèrt (Piedmontese) Tchialambèrt (Arpitan)
- Comune
- Comune di Chialamberto
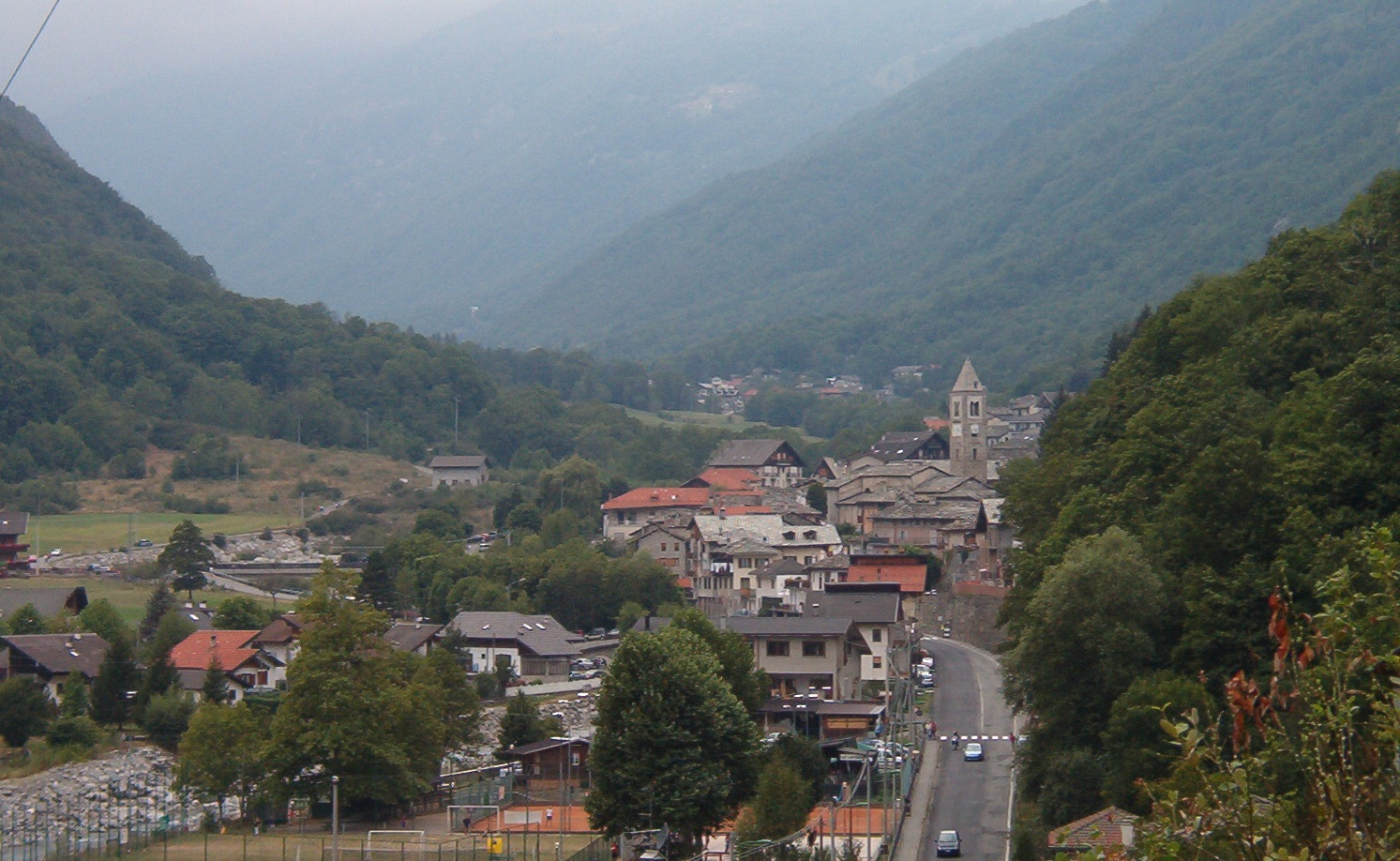

- Location within Italy Location within Piedmont
- Coordinates: 45°22′N 7°20′E
- Country: Italy
- Region: Piedmont
- Metropolitan city: Turin (TO)
- Frazioni: Breno, Bussoni, Candiela, Chialambertetto, Gabbi, Mottera, Prati della Via, Volpetta, Vonzo

Government
  - Mayor: Adriano Bonadè Bottino

Area
  - Total: 35 km^{2} (14 sq mi)
- Elevation: 851 m (2,792 ft)

Population (31 December 2019)
  - Total: 355
  - Density: 10/km^{2} (26/sq mi)
- Demonym: Chialambertesi
- Time zone: UTC+1 (CET)
  - Summer (DST): UTC+2 (CEST)
- Postal code: 10070
- Dialing code: 0123

Chialamberto (Piedmontese: Cialambèrt, Arpitan: Tchialambèrt) is a comune (municipality) in the Metropolitan City of Turin in the Italian region Piedmont, located about 45 kilometres (28 mi) northwest of Turin.

Chialamberto borders the following municipalities: Locana, Noasca, Groscavallo, Cantoira, Ceres, and Ala di Stura.
