= Levanna =

Mountain in Italy

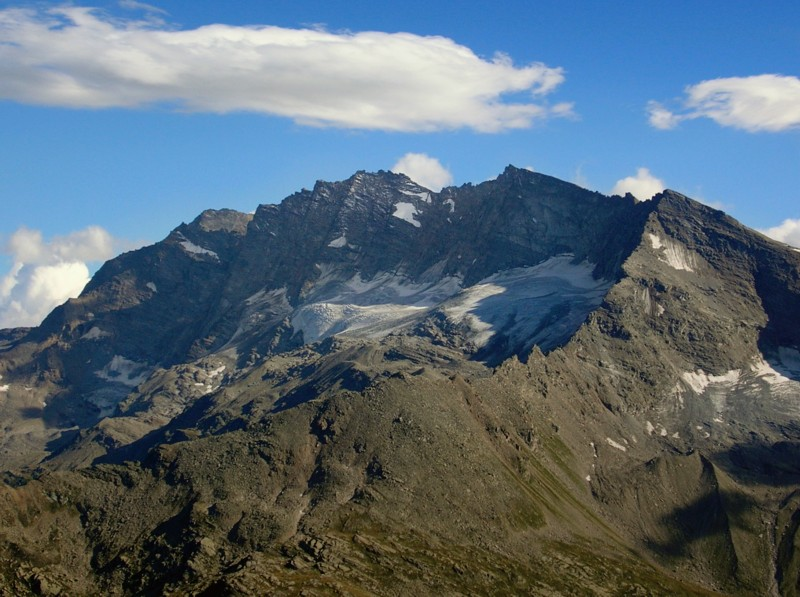

Highest point
- Elevation: 3,619 m (11,873 ft)
- Prominence: 541 m (1,775 ft)
- Isolation: 9.04 km (5.62 mi)
- Listing: Alpine mountains above 3000 m
- Coordinates: 45°24′37″N 07°10′19″E

Geography
- Location within Alps
- Location: Savoie, France; Metropolitan City of Turin, Italy
- Parent range: Graian Alps

The Levanne (singular: Levanna) is a group of mountains in Savoie (France) and the Metropolitan City of Turin (Italy). It lies in the Graian Alps range. The three highest peaks are:

- Levanna Orientale - 3,555 metres (11,663 ft)
- Levanna Centrale - 3,619 metres (11,873 ft)
- Levanna Occidentale - 3,593 metres (11,788 ft)

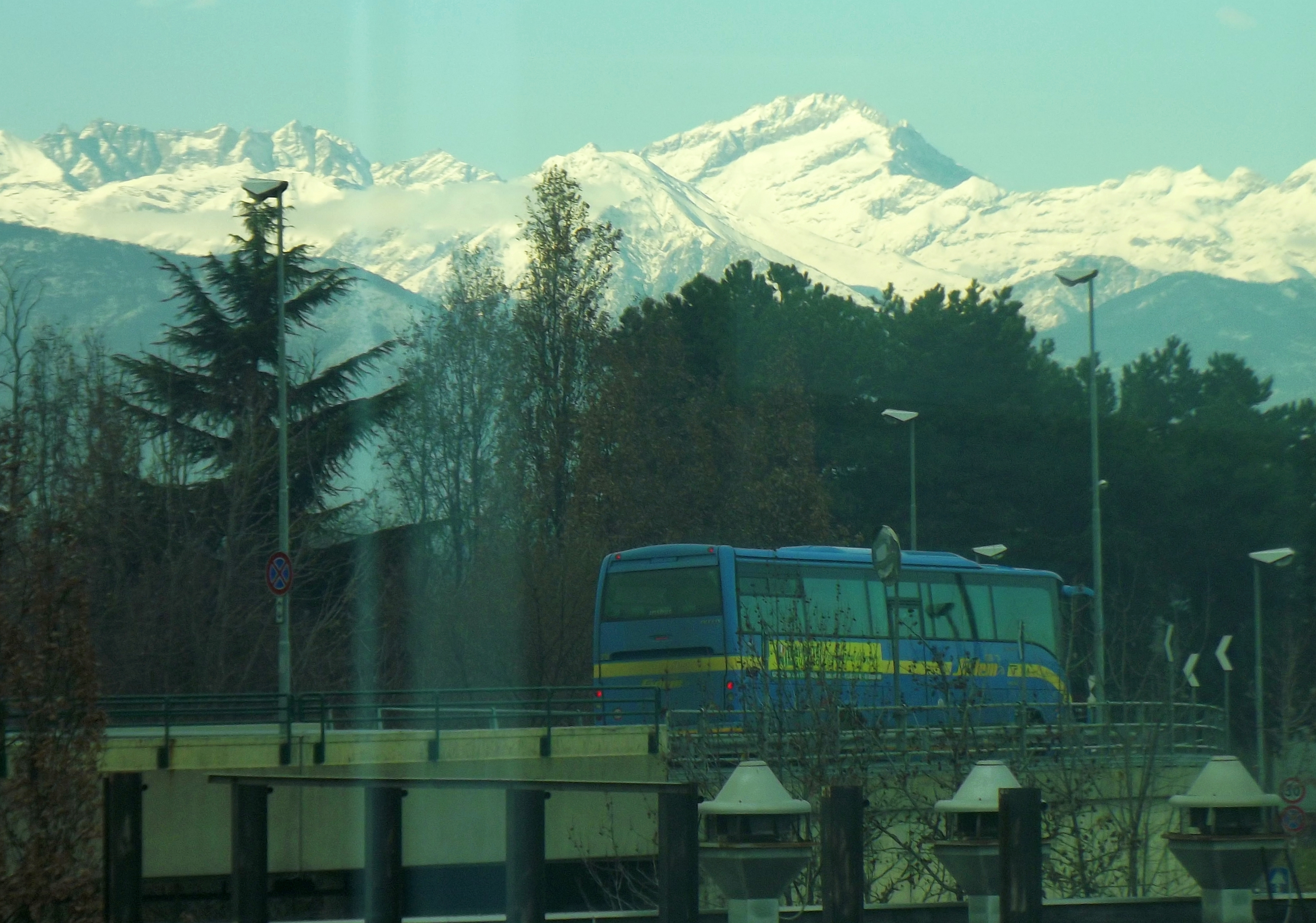
The mountains seen from Turin Airport
