= Lemie =

Lemie Leimia (Arpitan)
- Comune
- Comune di Lemie
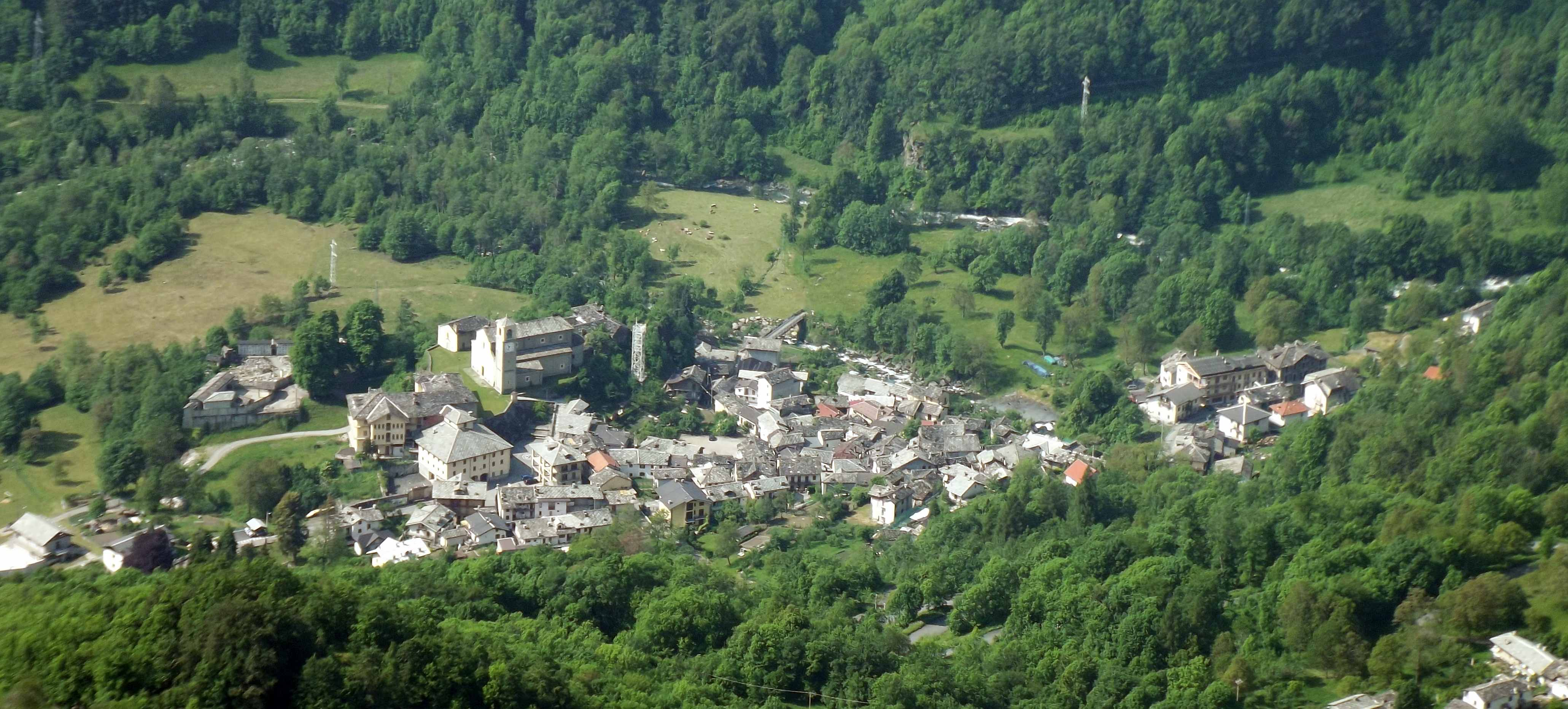

- Location within Italy Location within Piedmont
- Coordinates: 45°14′N 7°18′E
- Country: Italy
- Region: Piedmont
- Metropolitan city: Turin (TO)
- Frazioni: Chiampetto, Chiandusseglio, Chiot, Forno, Pian Saletta, Saletta, Villa di Lemie, Villaretti

Government
  - Mayor: Giacomo Lisa

Area
  - Total: 45.4 km^{2} (17.5 sq mi)
- Elevation: 960 m (3,150 ft)

Population (31 August 2017)
  - Total: 197
  - Density: 4.34/km^{2} (11.2/sq mi)
- Demonym: Lemiesi
- Time zone: UTC+1 (CET)
  - Summer (DST): UTC+2 (CEST)
- Postal code: 10070
- Dialing code: 0123
- Website: Official website

Lemie (Arpitan: Leimia) is a comune (municipality) in the Metropolitan City of Turin in the Italian region Piedmont, located about 35 kilometres (22 mi) northwest of Turin.

Lemie borders the following municipalities: Ala di Stura, Balme, Mezzenile, Usseglio, Viù, and Condove.
