= Bonneval-sur-Arc =

Bonneval-sur-Arc Bônavâl-sus-Arc (Arpitan)
- Commune
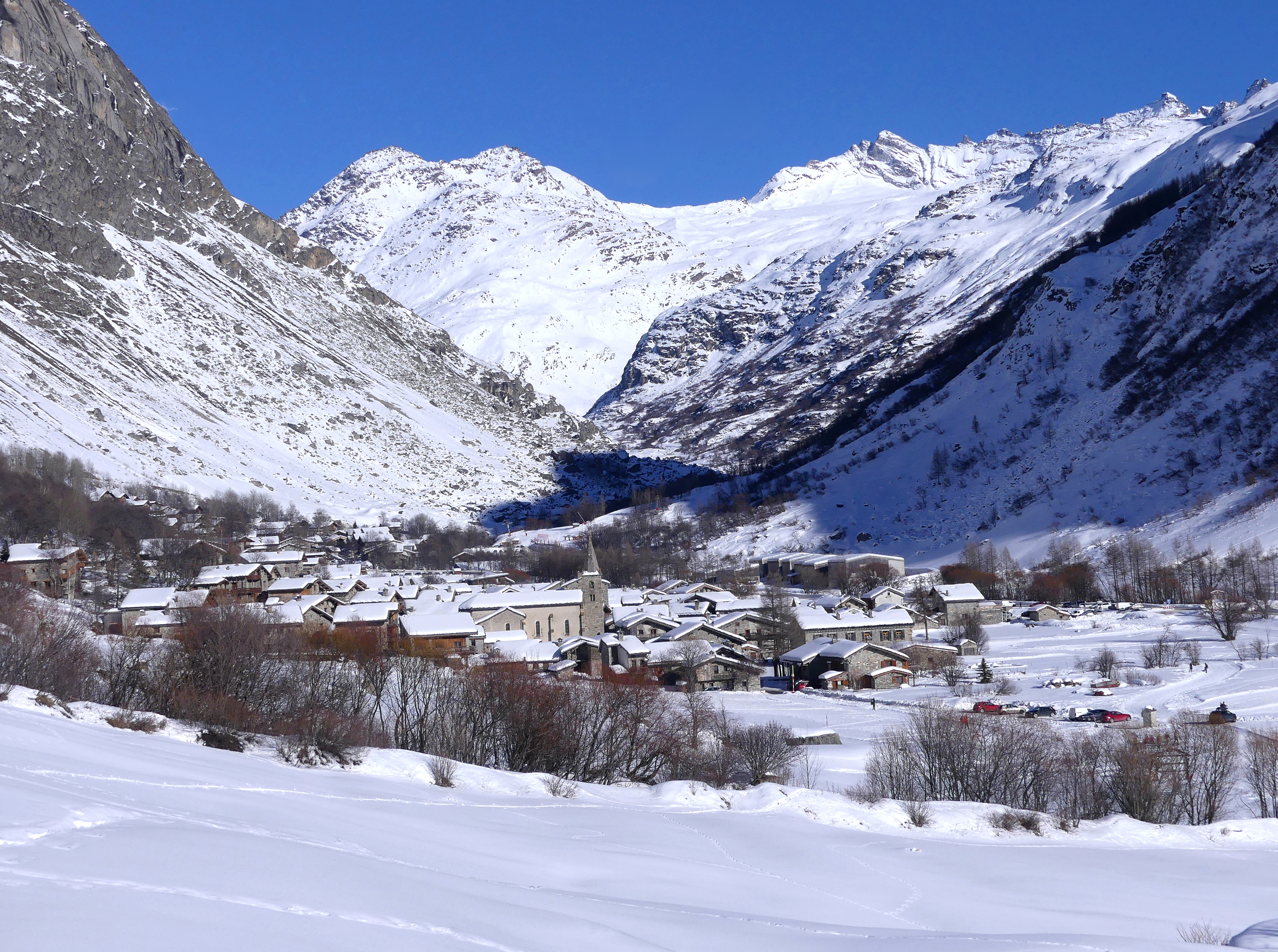
- A general view of Bonneval-sur-Arc

- Coat of arms
- Location of Bonneval-sur-Arc
- Location within France Location within Auvergne-Rhône-Alpes
- Coordinates: 45°22′20″N 7°02′50″E
- Country: France
- Region: Auvergne-Rhône-Alpes
- Department: Savoie
- Arrondissement: Saint-Jean-de-Maurienne
- Canton: Modane
- Intercommunality: Haute Maurienne-Vanoise

Government
  - Mayor (2020–2026): Marc Konareff
- Area^{1}: 112.55 km^{2} (43.46 sq mi)
- Highest elevation: 3,642 m (11,949 ft)
- Lowest elevation: 1,759 m (5,771 ft)
- Population (2023): 285
  - Density: 2.53/km^{2} (6.56/sq mi)
- Time zone: UTC+01:00 (CET)
  - Summer (DST): UTC+02:00 (CEST)
- INSEE/Postal code: 73047 /73480
- Website: www.mairie-de-bonnevalsurarc.fr
- ^{1} French Land Register data, which excludes lakes, ponds, glaciers > 1 km^{2} (0.386 sq mi or 247 acres) and river estuaries.

Bonneval-sur-Arc (French pronunciation: [bɔnval syʁ aʁk], lit. "Bonneval-on-Arc"; Arpitan: Bônavâl-sus-Arc or simply Bônavâl) is an alpine commune in the Savoie department in the Auvergne-Rhône-Alpes region in Southeastern France. It is located on the Italian border, with part of its territory within Vanoise National Park. As of 2023, the population of the commune was 285.

It is a member of the Les Plus Beaux Villages de France association.

== Climate ==
Bonneval-sur-Arc features an alpine climate due to its high elevation, just under the tree line. Its climate is characterised by very cold, snowy winters and cool, stormy summers.

Climate data for Bonneval-sur-Arc, elevation : 1791 m (5,875 ft)
Month	Jan	Feb	Mar	Apr	May	Jun	Jul	Aug	Sep	Oct	Nov	Dec	Year
Mean daily maximum °C (°F)	−8.1 (17.4)	−6.9 (19.6)	−3.5 (25.7)	−0.4 (31.3)	3.9 (39.0)	9.7 (49.5)	12.2 (54.0)	12.1 (53.8)	8.7 (47.7)	4.5 (40.1)	−2.8 (27.0)	−7.1 (19.2)	1.9 (35.4)
Daily mean °C (°F)	−11.1 (12.0)	−10.5 (13.1)	−7.0 (19.4)	−3.5 (25.7)	0.5 (32.9)	5.9 (42.6)	8.2 (46.8)	8.1 (46.6)	4.6 (40.3)	0.7 (33.3)	−6.0 (21.2)	−9.9 (14.2)	−1.7 (29.0)
Mean daily minimum °C (°F)	−14.1 (6.6)	−13.8 (7.2)	−10.4 (13.3)	−6.8 (19.8)	−3.2 (26.2)	1.7 (35.1)	3.8 (38.8)	3.9 (39.0)	0.8 (33.4)	−2.8 (27.0)	−9.2 (15.4)	−12.9 (8.8)	−5.2 (22.6)
Average precipitation mm (inches)	92 (3.6)	82 (3.2)	91 (3.6)	127 (5.0)	145 (5.7)	151 (5.9)	140 (5.5)	134 (5.3)	123 (4.8)	117 (4.6)	141 (5.6)	102 (4.0)	1,445 (56.8)
Source: fr.climate-data.org/europe/france/rhone-alpes/bonneval-sur-arc

== See also ==
- Communes of the Savoie department
