= Viù =

Viù Vieu (Arpitan)
- Comune
- Comune di Viù
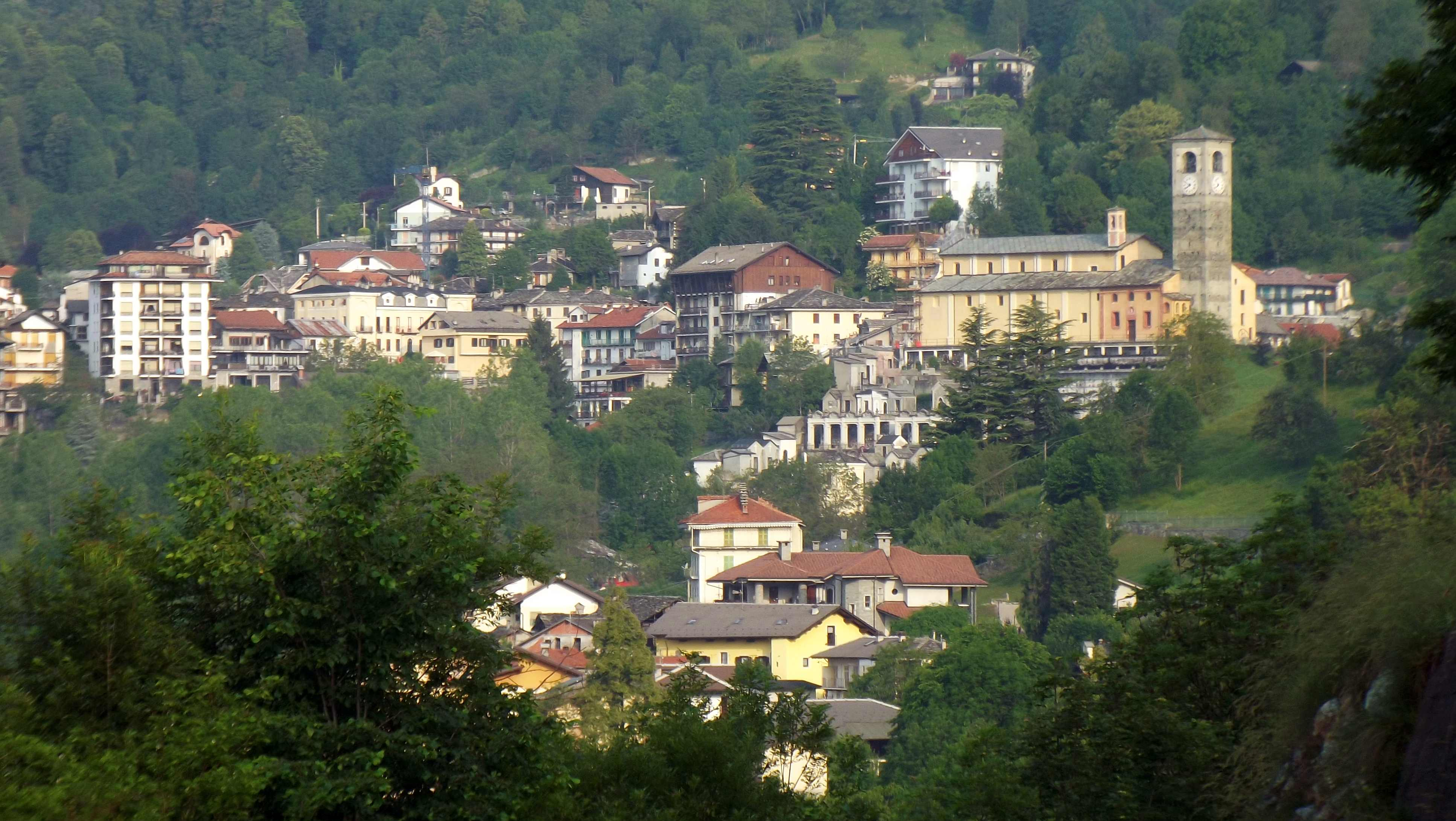

- Location within Italy Location within Piedmont
- Coordinates: 45°14′N 7°22′E
- Country: Italy
- Region: Piedmont
- Metropolitan city: Turin (TO)
- Frazioni: Aires, Balma, Bertesseno, Chiaberge, Col del Lys, Col San Giovanni, Corgnolero, Cramoletti, Fubina, Fucine, Guicciardera, Maddalene, Molar, Mondrezza, Niquidetto, Pessinea, Polpresa, Salvagnengo, Toglie, Tornetti, Trichera, Tuberghengo, Venera, Vernai, Versino Brendo

Government
  - Mayor: Daniela Majrano

Area
  - Total: 84.11 km^{2} (32.48 sq mi)
- Elevation: 785 m (2,575 ft)

Population (1-1-2017)
  - Total: 1,039
  - Density: 12.35/km^{2} (31.99/sq mi)
- Demonym: Viucesi
- Time zone: UTC+1 (CET)
  - Summer (DST): UTC+2 (CEST)
- Postal code: 10070
- Dialing code: 0123
- Website: Official website

Viù (Arpitan: Vieu) is a comune (municipality) in the Metropolitan City of Turin in the Italian region Piedmont, located about 30 kilometres (19 mi) northwest of Turin.

Viù's central square used to feature a wooden statue of Pinocchio, which was 6.53 meters tall and weighed about 4000 kilograms. The statue has since been removed.

== Sightseeing ==
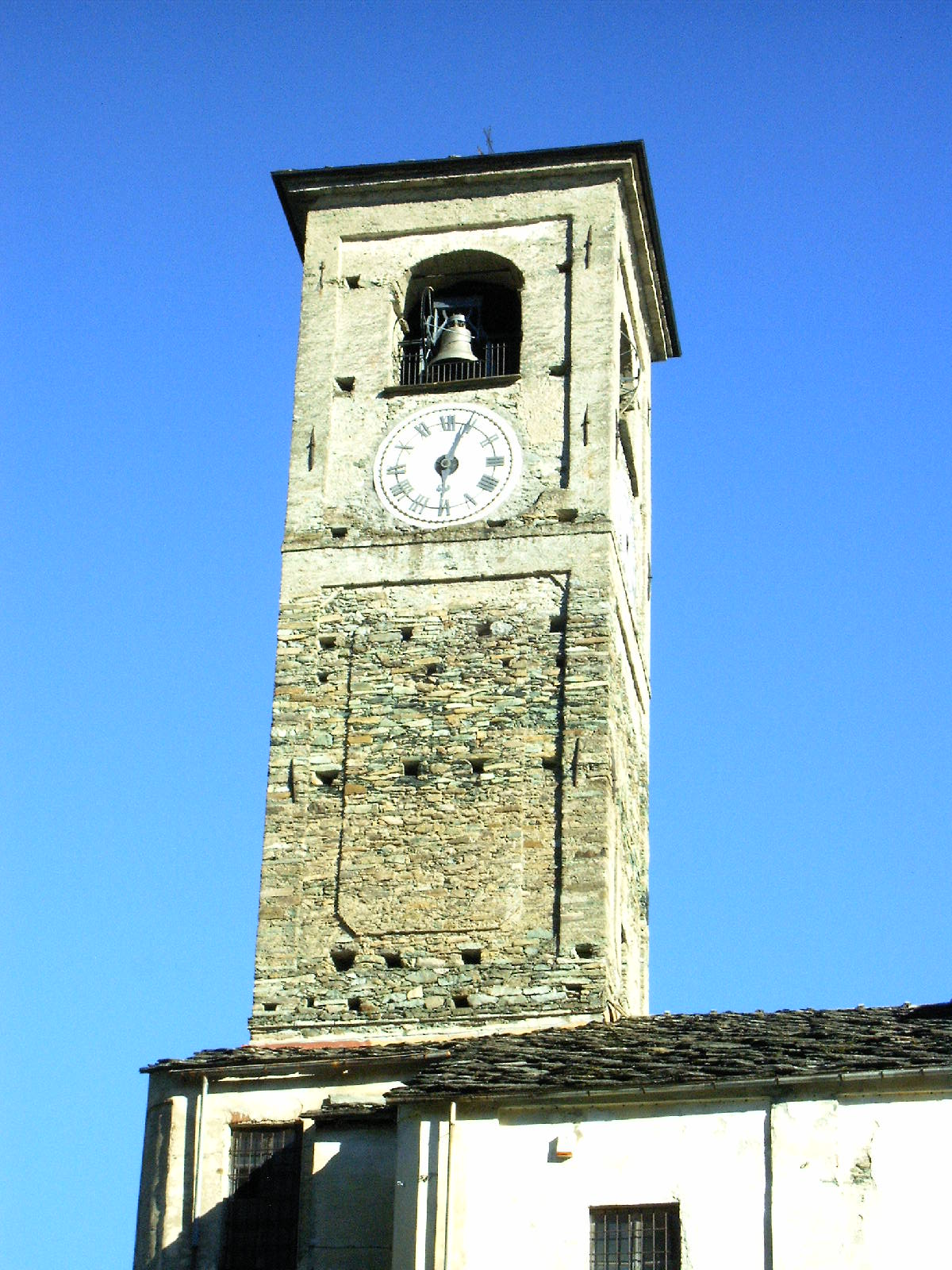
Belltower of the parish church

- One of the most beautiful historical villas is Villa Franchetti. The villa was built in 1861 by the Baron Raimondo Franchetti in Swiss chalet style. Several notable people have stayed in the villa including Giacomo Puccini who has been told to having composed part of La bohème within its walls. Amongst other notable personalities the Prince of Piedmont Umberto II of Italy and the infamous Third Reich minister Hermann Göring stayed at the villa.
- 20 minutes away from Viù you will find the Devil's Bridge, located in the near village of Lanzo Torinese
