= Arpitan Valleys of Piedmont =

Approximate map of the Arpitan Valleys of Piedmont: officially recognised or generally attested Arpitan communes in cyan; former, moribund or historical areas in red; transitional, doubtful or disputed areas in yellow; and frazioni or parts of communes outside the main Arpitan area shown with hatching.

The Arpitan Valleys of Piedmont (Arpitan: Valâdes arpitanes du Piemont) are the upper parts of the valleys in the north-west of the Province of Turin, in Piedmont (Italy), whose traditional speech belongs to the Arpitan (Franco-Provençal) language, like the neighbouring Aosta Valley, Savoy, Bresse and Valais. They cover an area of 1,589.06 km² and had 65,995 inhabitants.

The local Arpitan varieties form a group distinct from the Valdôtain dialect of the adjacent Aosta Valley; the variety of the Soana Valley, for example, is known as Vâlsoanin. Together with Occitan, French and Walser, Arpitan is one of the historical linguistic minorities of Piedmont recognised and protected under Italian Law No. 482 of 15 December 1999.

== Valleys ==
The valleys, from north to south, are:

- Soana Valley (Vâl Soana)
- Orco Valley (Vâl d'Orco)
- Lanzo Valleys (Vâlades at Lans)
- Cenis Valley (Vâl Cenischia)
- Suse Valley (Vâl Susa)
- Sangone Valley (Vâl Sangon)

The Lanzo Valleys are themselves made up of three valleys (the Val Grande (Vâl Grande), the Val d'Ala (Vâl d'Ala) and the Val di Viù (Vâl di Viù)), so that the area is sometimes described as comprising eight valleys in total.

== Arpitan communes of Piedmont ==
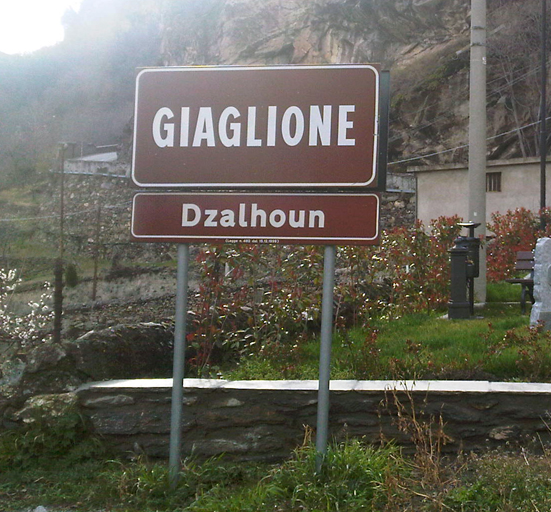
Italian/Arpitan bilingual sign.

The following communes (comuni) are recognised as belonging to the Arpitan minority under Law 482/1999.

Communes of the Arpitan minority
Name in Arpitan	Name in Italian
Ala	Ala di Stura
Almèis	Almese
La Alpete	Alpette
Velhanna	Avigliana
Bârmes	Balme
Burgùn	Borgone Susa
Bërsoel	Bruzolo
Busoulin	Bussoleno
Centuèiri	Cantoira
Ciàvrie	Caprie
Karéma	Carema
Kastagnòle	Castagnole Piemonte
Séres	Ceres
Sérisoles	Cerisole Reale
Tchialambèrt	Chialamberto
Tsanuch	Chianocco
Kiusa	Chiusa di San Michele
Cuasöl	Coassolo Torinese
Couvase	Coazze
Kundòve	Condove
Koeri	Corio
Frasinei	Frassinetto
Sen German	Germagnano
Gravere	Gravere
Gruskavà	Groscavallo
L'Éngri	Ingria
Dzalioun	Giaglione
Javën	Giaveno
Lans	Lanzo Torinese
Leimia	Lemie
Lukënna	Locana
Màtie	Mattie
Meana	Meana di Susa
Misinì	Mezzenile
Moutier	Monastero di Lanzo
Frere Cenisio	Moncenisio
Mumpantia	Mompantero
Nuachi	Noasca
Nonalésa	Novalesa
Pisinài	Pessinetto
Pont	Pont Canavese
Kuisnè	Quincinetto
Riburdon	Ribordone
Ronc	Ronco Canavese
Rubiana	Rubiana
Sen Didé	San Didero
San Goeri	San Giorio di Susa
Sent Ambreu	Sant'Ambrogio di Torino
Santantunin	Sant'Antonino di Susa
Sparon	Sparone
Souiza	Susa
Tràves	Traves
Usei	Usseglio
Vàjes	Vaie
Voudjiň	Valgioie
Vâlprà	Valprato Soana
Veno	Venaus
Vilà	Villar Dora
Vilar Fuciard	Villar Focchiardo
Vjy	Viù

The legally protected area does not correspond in every case to a uniform dialectological area. The valleys are separated by mountain chains but open towards the Po valley, a situation that has favored long-standing contact with Piedmontese, especially in its Turin and Canavese varieties. In many places, particularly in the lower valleys, Piedmontese has coexisted with, influenced, or replaced the local language. In the IRES Piemonte survey, 36.7% of residents in the Arpitan area reported some knowledge of the local Arpitan varieties.

Linguistic research has questioned the Arpitan character of some of the listed communes. According to IRES Piemonte, several municipalities, including Pont Canavese, Corio, Lanzo Torinese, Monastero di Lanzo and Castagnole Piemonte, had adopted the Arpitan designation through local resolutions in the context of the protections and funding made available under Law 482/1999, although the study classified them as “deliberating but not belonging” to the Arpitan linguistic area.

A similar distinction is sometimes necessary inside individual communes. In parts of the lower Susa Valley and neighbouring areas, Savoyard or Arpitan elements may survive mainly as traces in surnames, toponyms or local vocabulary within Piedmontese speech. Marginal sub-municipal cases have also been reported, including Grandubbione, a hamlet of Pinasca, and Pratovigero (Pravigè or Pravigé), a hamlet of Trana; these are better treated as local historical or toponymic attestations rather than as evidence that the entire communes of Pinasca or Trana belong to the Arpitan area.

== See also ==
- Occitan Valleys
- Arpitan language
- Valdôtain dialect
- Vâlsoanin dialect
- Arpitania

== Bibliography ==
- Toso, Fiorenzo (2008). Le minoranze linguistiche in Italia (in Italian). Bologna: Il Mulino. pp. 116–122.
- Allasino, Enrico; Ferrier, Consuelo; Scamuzzi, Sergio; Telmon, Tullio (2007). Le lingue del Piemonte. Quaderni di ricerca (in Italian). Vol. 113. Turin: IRES Piemonte.
