= Vaie =

Vaie Vaje/Vàjes (Piedmontese) Vaje/Vàjes (Arpitan)
- Comune
- Comune di Vaie
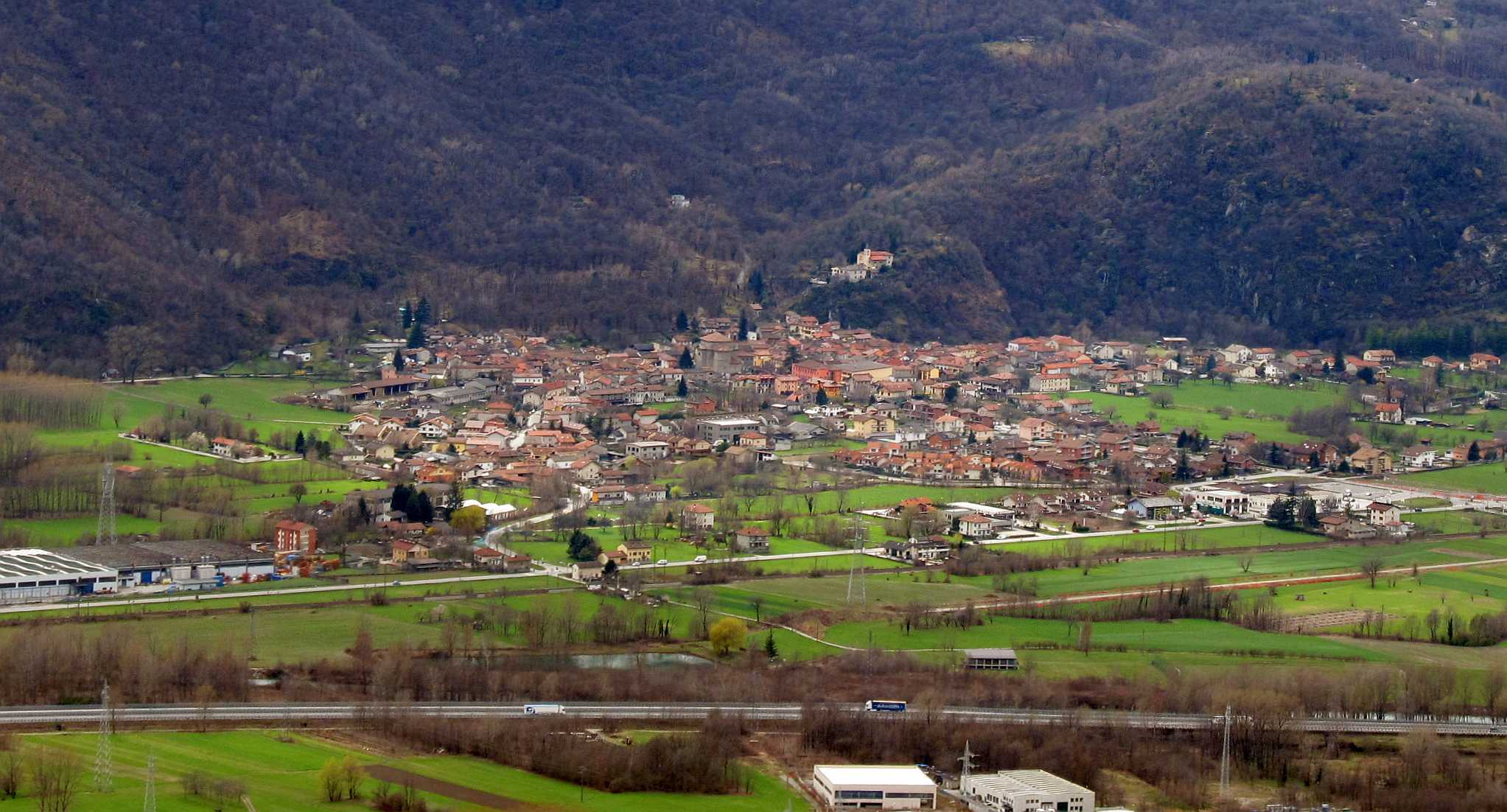
- Panorama from truc del Serro

- Location within Italy Location within Piedmont
- Coordinates: 45°6′N 7°17′E
- Country: Italy
- Region: Piedmont
- Metropolitan city: Turin (TO)
- Frazioni: Folatone, La Mura

Government
  - Mayor: Enzo Merini

Area
  - Total: 7.1 km^{2} (2.7 sq mi)

Population (Dec. 2004)
  - Total: 1,413
  - Density: 200/km^{2} (520/sq mi)
- Time zone: UTC+1 (CET)
  - Summer (DST): UTC+2 (CEST)
- Postal code: 10050
- Dialing code: 011
- Patron saint: Saint Pancras
- Saint day: May 12
- Website: https://www.comune.vaie.to.it/

Vaie (Piedmontese and Arpitan: Vaje or Vàjes) is a comune (municipality) in the Metropolitan City of Turin in the Italian region Piedmont, located about 35 kilometres (22 mi) west of Turin in the Susa Valley. As of 31 December 2004, it had a population of 1,413 and an area of 7.1 square kilometres (2.7 mi^{2}).

Vaie borders the following municipalities: Condove, Sant'Antonino di Susa, Chiusa di San Michele, Coazze and Valgioie.

== Demographic evolution ==
Historical population

| Year | Pop. | ±% |
|---|---|---|
| 1861 | 874 | — |
| 1871 | 914 | +4.6% |
| 1881 | 959 | +4.9% |
| 1901 | 1,144 | +19.3% |
| 1911 | 1,309 | +14.4% |

| Year | Pop. | ±% |
|---|---|---|
| 1921 | 1,268 | −3.1% |
| 1931 | 1,211 | −4.5% |
| 1936 | 1,223 | +1.0% |
| 1951 | 1,219 | −0.3% |
| 1961 | 1,210 | −0.7% |

| Year | Pop. | ±% |
|---|---|---|
| 1971 | 1,187 | −1.9% |
| 1981 | 1,055 | −11.1% |
| 1991 | 1,123 | +6.4% |
| 2001 | 1,351 | +20.3% |

Source: Data from ISTAT
