= San Giorio di Susa =

San Giorio di Susa San Gieuri (Piedmontese) San Gœri (Arpitan) Saint-Joire de Suse (French)
- Comune
- Comune di San Giorio di Susa
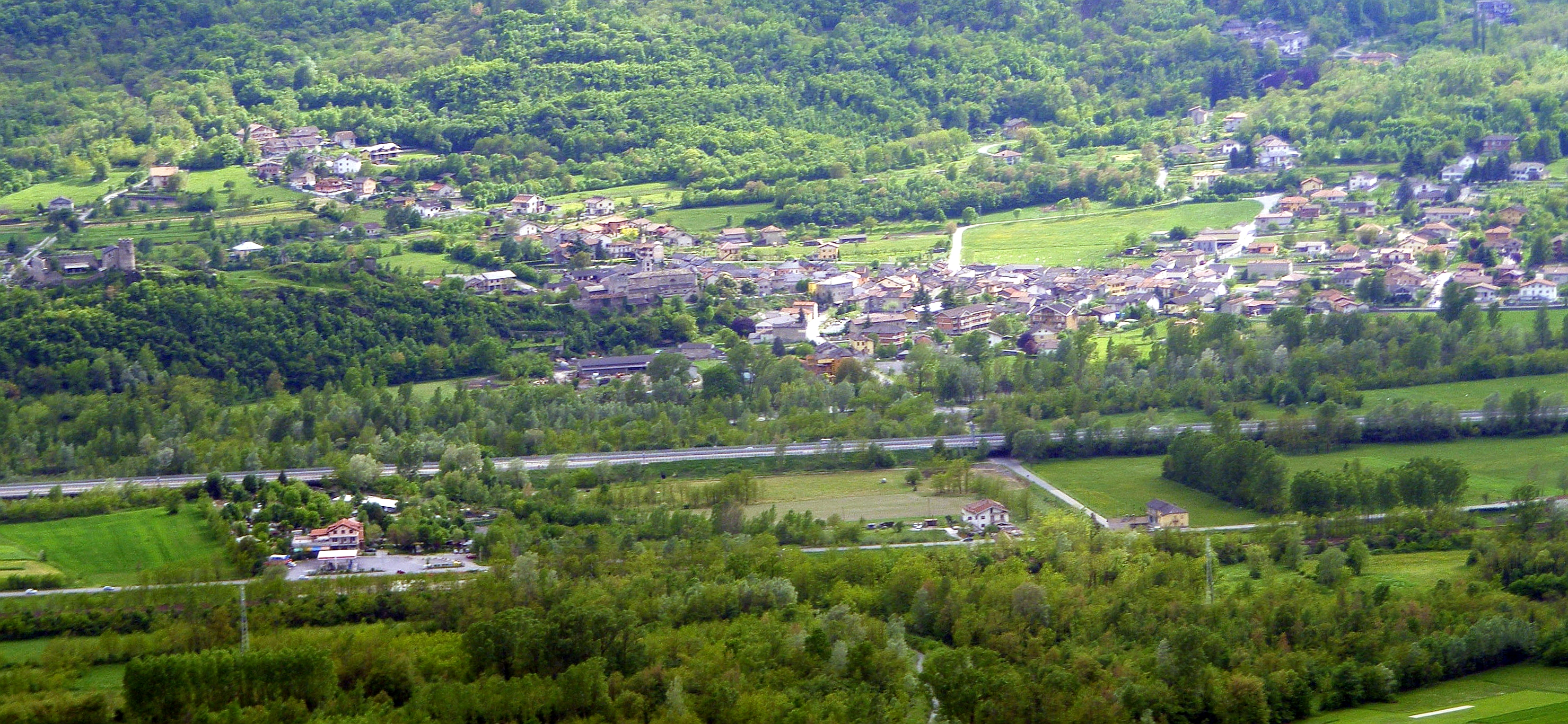

- Coat of arms

- Location within Italy Location within Piedmont
- Coordinates: 45°8′N 7°10′E
- Country: Italy
- Region: Piedmont
- Metropolitan city: Turin (TO)
- Frazioni: Adrit, Airassa, Balma, Città, Garda, Grangia, Martinetti, Pognant, Viglietti

Government
  - Mayor: Danilo Bar

Area
  - Total: 19.6 km^{2} (7.6 sq mi)
- Elevation: 420 m (1,380 ft)

Population (31 July 2018)
  - Total: 979
  - Density: 49.9/km^{2} (129/sq mi)
- Demonym: Sangioriesi
- Time zone: UTC+1 (CET)
  - Summer (DST): UTC+2 (CEST)
- Postal code: 10050
- Dialing code: 0122
- Patron saint: Saint George
- Saint day: April 23
- Website: Official website

San Giorio di Susa (Piedmontese: San Gieuri, Arpitan: San Gœri, French: Saint-Joire de Suse) is a comune (municipality) in the Metropolitan City of Turin in the Italian region Piedmont, located about 45 km west of Turin.

San Giorio di Susa borders the following municipalities: Bruzolo, Chianocco, Bussoleno, San Didero, Villar Focchiardo, Coazze, Roure.

The castle of San Giorio di Susa was visited by King Edward I of England in 1273 on his way back from crusade. The distinctive three pinnacled merlons of the crenellations were later copied at Conwy Castle in Wales.
