= Chiusa di San Michele =

Chiusa di San Michele Ciusa San Michel (Piedmontese) Kiusa (Arpitan) L'Écluse (French)
- Comune
- Comune di Chiusa di San Michele
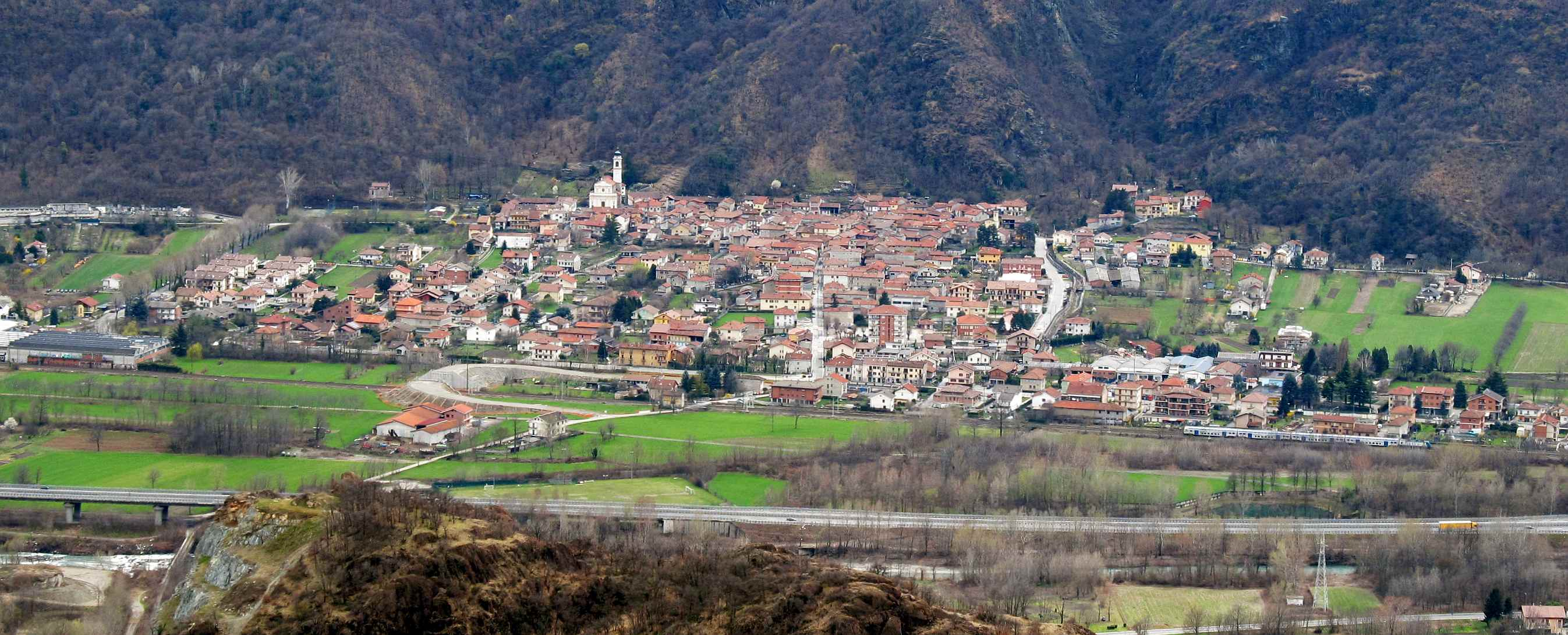
- Panorama from truc del Serro

- Coat of arms

- Location within Italy Location within Piedmont
- Coordinates: 45°6′N 7°19′E
- Country: Italy
- Region: Piedmont
- Metropolitan city: Turin (TO)
- Frazioni: Bennale, Basinnato, Molè

Government
  - Mayor: Fabrizio Borgesa

Area
  - Total: 6.0 km^{2} (2.3 sq mi)
- Elevation: 378 m (1,240 ft)

Population (30 September 2011)
  - Total: 1,701
  - Density: 280/km^{2} (730/sq mi)
- Demonym: Chiusini
- Time zone: UTC+1 (CET)
  - Summer (DST): UTC+2 (CEST)
- Postal code: 10050
- Dialing code: 011
- Patron saint: Peter and Paul
- Saint day: 29 June
- Website: Official website

Chiusa di San Michele (Piedmontese: Ciusa San Michel, Arpitan: Kiusa, French: L'Écluse) is a comune (municipality) in the Metropolitan City of Turin in the Italian region Piedmont, located about 30 kilometres (19 mi) west of Turin.

== Geography ==
Chiusa di San Michele borders the municipalities of Condove, Caprie, Vaie, Sant'Ambrogio di Torino, Valgioie, and Coazze.

There is the monastery of Sacra di San Michele in the vicinity.
