= Arpitania =

Cultural region in the Western Alps

Arpitania Arpitania
- Cultural region
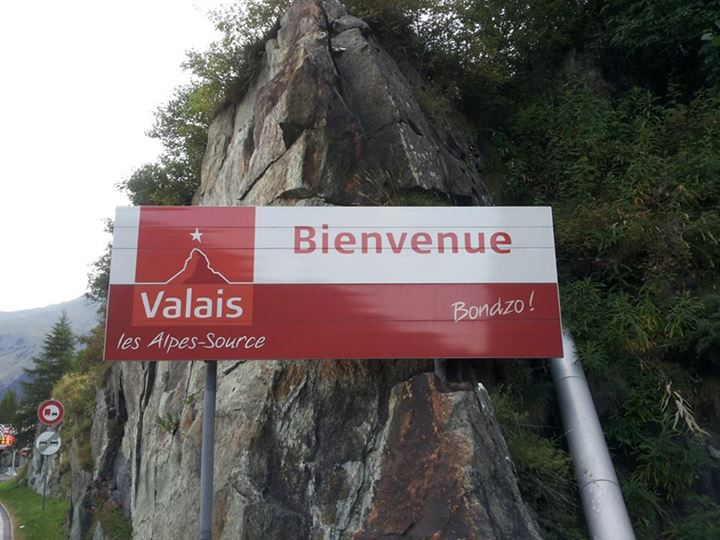
- French sign "Welcome" with Arpitan "Hello" in Saint-Gingolph (Valais)

- Flag

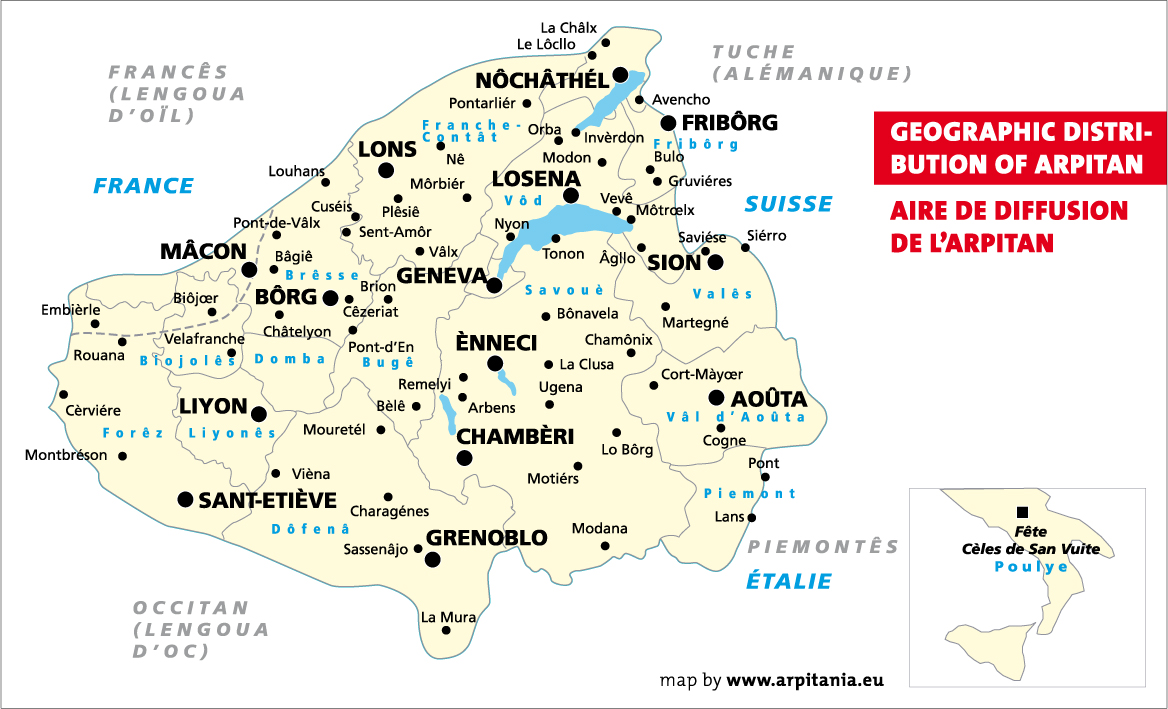
- Linguistic map of Arpitania in Arpitan
- Coordinates: 46°09′N 5°52′E
- Continent: Europe

Area
  - Total: 60,000 km^{2} (23,000 sq mi)

Population
  - Total: 7,600,000
  - Density: 130/km^{2} (330/sq mi)

Arpitania (Arpitan and Italian: Arpitania, French: Arpitanie [aʁpitani]) is a cultural region in Western Alps where the Arpitan language was historically spoken and still persists today. It approximately encompasses parts of eastern France, northwestern Italy and western Switzerland, concretely:

- France (Ain, Isère, Rhône, Savoie, Haute-Savoie, the Metropolis of Lyon, and parts of Jura).
- Switzerland (Geneva, Fribourg, Neuchâtel, Valais, and Vaud, i.e. all of Romandy except Jura)
- Italy (Aosta Valley and Arpitan Valleys)

Even though Arpitania has never been constituted as a united political entity, it roughly corresponds to the historical County of Savoy and its successor state the Duchy of Savoy. Currently, the only Arpitan-speaking region which formally recognises the language is the Aosta Valley, where it is protected.

Over 7,600,000 people live in Arpitania, but only around 150,000 speakers of Arpitan live here. French is the most-spoken language in Arpitania, followed by Italian. The most populous cities in Arpitania are Lyon, Geneva, and Saint-Étienne.

== Creation ==
The terms Arpitan and Arpitania (Arpitanie) are neologisms coined in the 1970s by Joseph Henriet (born 1945), a Communist school teacher who was influenced by the Basque activist Federico Krutwig. In his Garaldea (published 1978), Krutwig names the Basques "Garalditans", a purported Neolithic race which he claimed existed thousands of years ago. Looking for racial or linguistic remnants of the "Garalditans", he moved to the Aosta Valley in 1970, constructing Basque etymologies for local placenames.

In Aosta, Krutwig befriended the young Maoist activist Joseph Henriet. Influenced by Krutwig, Henriet declared the local patois the descendant of the Neolithic "Garalditan language". He later replaced the term garalditan with harpitan, a conflation of the patois words arpa "alp", arpian "one who works on an alp", and the Basque etymology Basque harri-pe "under the rocks" proposed by Krutwig.

Around 1980, Henriet dropped the Basque-inspired initial h-, now proposing an "Arpitan confederation" (Confédération arpitane) uniting Savoy and the Valais (but not including the patois-speaking Vaud). With the failure of his Arpitan political movement, he retired to private life.

The term arpitan since the 1990s has found usage beyond the immediate sphere of Henriet's activities, especially driven by online use. Pichard (2009) suggests its newfound success was due to the happy rhyme with Occitan and the unwieldiness of the alternative francoprovençal. The alternative term patois, while viewed with affection in Switzerland, has a condescending or "humiliating" connotation in France. An Aliance Culturèla Arpitanna was founded in 2004.

== Geography ==
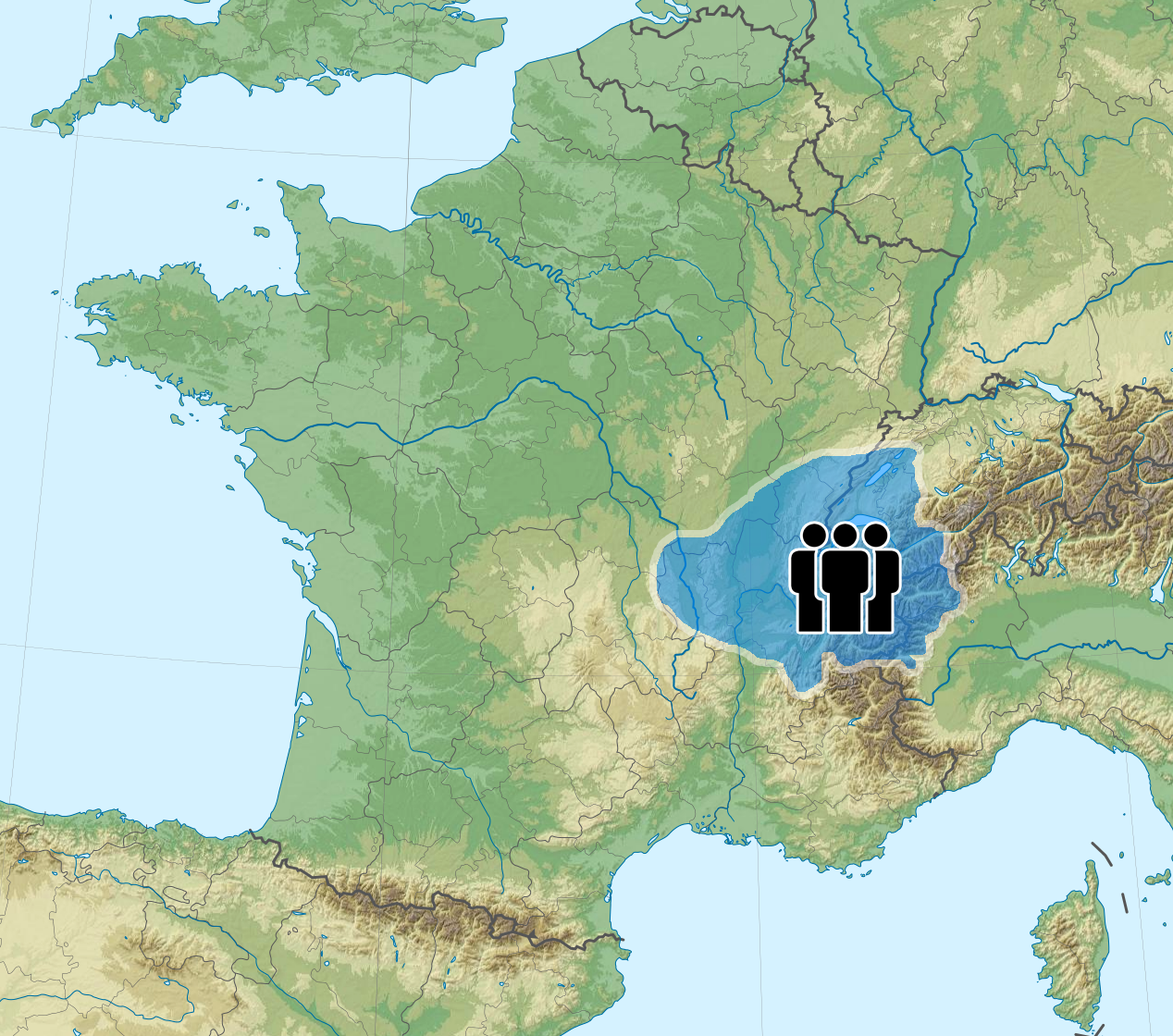
Map of Arpitania in Western Europe

The geographic extent of Arpitania, usually defined by linguistic or cultural factors, is dispersed over three countries.

- Most of Arpitania lies in France, in the departments of Ain, Isère, Rhône, Savoie, and Haute-Savoie, as well as the Metropolis of Lyon. Besides, the southern part of the department of Jura is Arpitan-speaking.
- Almost the entire French-speaking part of Switzerland, also known as Romandy, lies in Arpitania except for the canton of Jura. The Arpitan cantons are Geneva, Fribourg, Neuchâtel, Valais, and Vaud.
- The remaining part of Arpitania lies in Italy, covering the entire Aosta Valley and the Arpitan Valleys in the Piedmont region. In Apulia, an Arpitan language exclave exists, but it is not connected sociolinguistically to Arpitania.

=== Historical regions ===
Traditionally, Arpitania is divided into the following regions.

- Aosta Valley (Val d'Aoûta), with capital in Aosta.
- Arpitan Valleys (Valades Arpetanes), with capital in Susa.
- Bernese Jura, with capital in Saint-Imier.
- Burgundy (Borgogne), with capital in Mâcon.
- Dauphiné (Dârfenât), with capital in Grenoble.
- Jura, with capital in Lons-le-Saunier.
- Lyonnais (Liyonês), with capital in Lyon.
- Romandy (Romandia), with capital in Lausanne.
- Savoy (Savouè), with capital in Chambéry.

=== Largest settlements ===
The most populous city in Arpitania is Lyon, which has a metropolitan area with 2,327,861 inhabitants. Other significant metropolitan areas are Grand Geneva (1,046,168 inhabitants) and -to a lesser extent- the Grenoble metropolitan area (714,799 inhabitants). Most bigger cities in Arpitania are located in either of these three metropolitan areas.

== Language ==
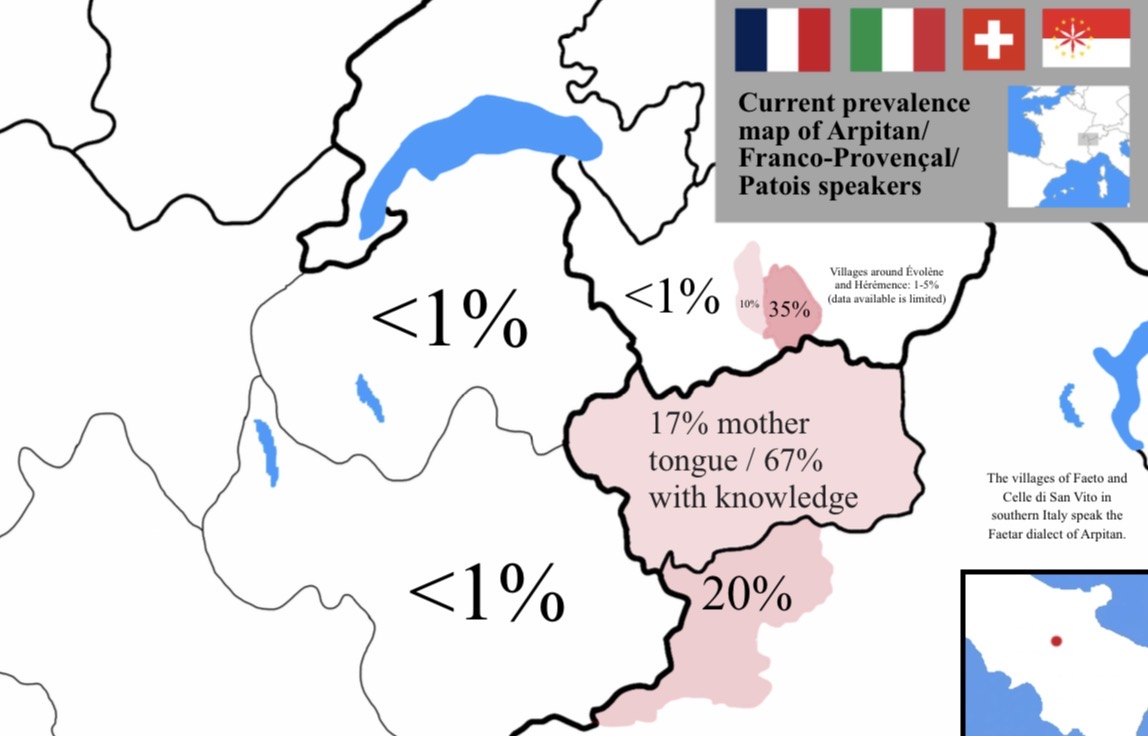
Current prevalence map of Arpitan speakers

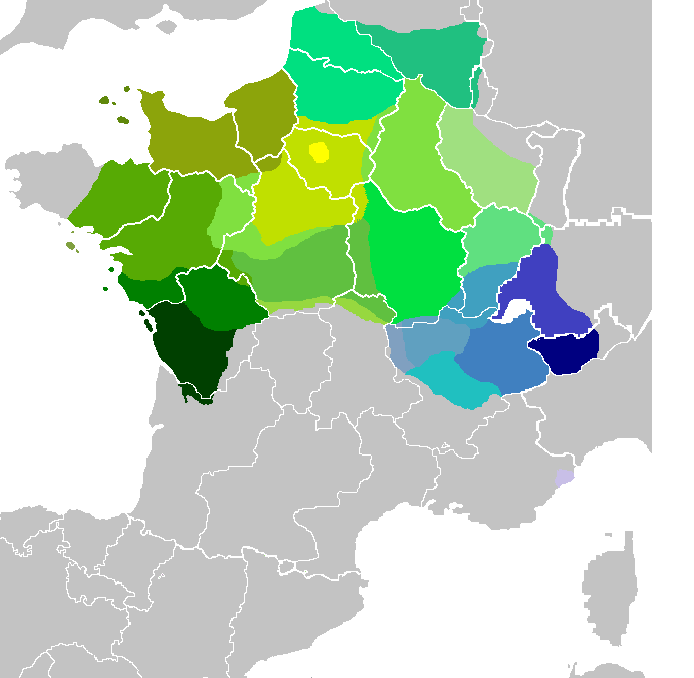
Approximate geographic distribution of Gallo-Romance languages, consisting of Oïl languages (green) and Arpitan (blue).

The Arpitan language, formerly known as Franco-Provençal or alternatively patois, is the native language of Arpitania. It belongs to the Gallo-Romance languages, while also being influenced strongly by the bordering languages Occitan, Piedmontese, and Romansh. Ethnologue describes Arpitan as "nearly extinct".

The language is only recognised in the Aosta Valley, where it is commonly referred to as valdôtain, but does not form part of the education system, nor is the language present in the education systems in other parts of Arpitania. In 2022, the UNPO denounced the "severe restriction of language rights by the French government" in Arpitania due to the lack of any formal recognition of the language in France. It is also only the Aosta Valley where Arpitan is still spoken across different generations, while the remaining regions have almost only elderly speakers.

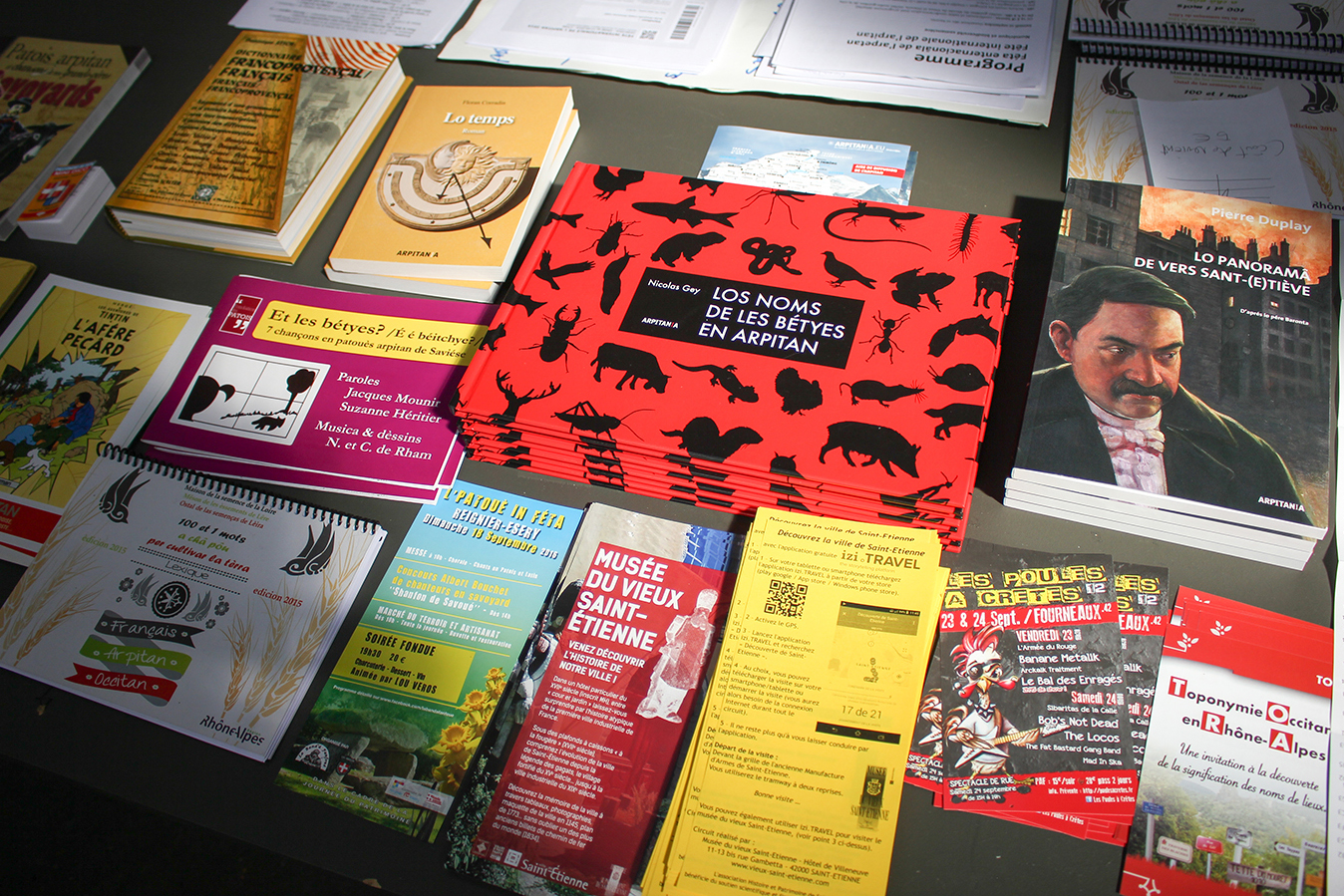
Books in Arpitan

Due to strong dialectal differences in Arpitan and a general lack of shared identification among Arpitan-speakers, the language is often referred to by using geolinguistic names, including valsoanin, mâconnais, and savoyard. To unify these dialects in written Arpitan, a standard orthography has been developed by the Arpitan linguist Domenico Stich in 2003, which was dubbed ORB (Ortografia de rèference B). This orthography is used in dictionaries and automatic translation machines. Next to the standard orthography, many dialects of Arpitan dispose over their own orthography.

== Gallery ==
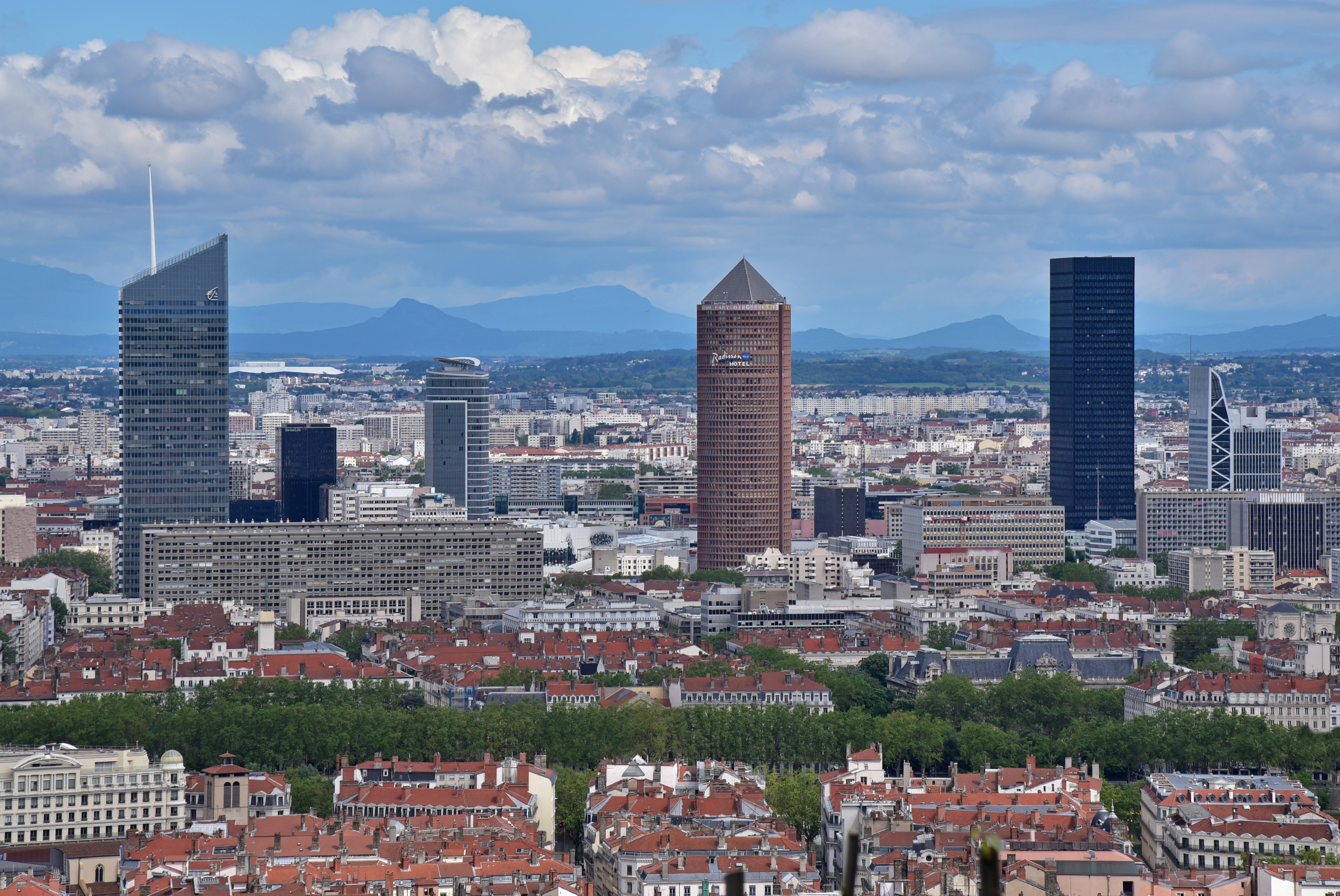
The skyline of the Part-Dieu district in Lyon

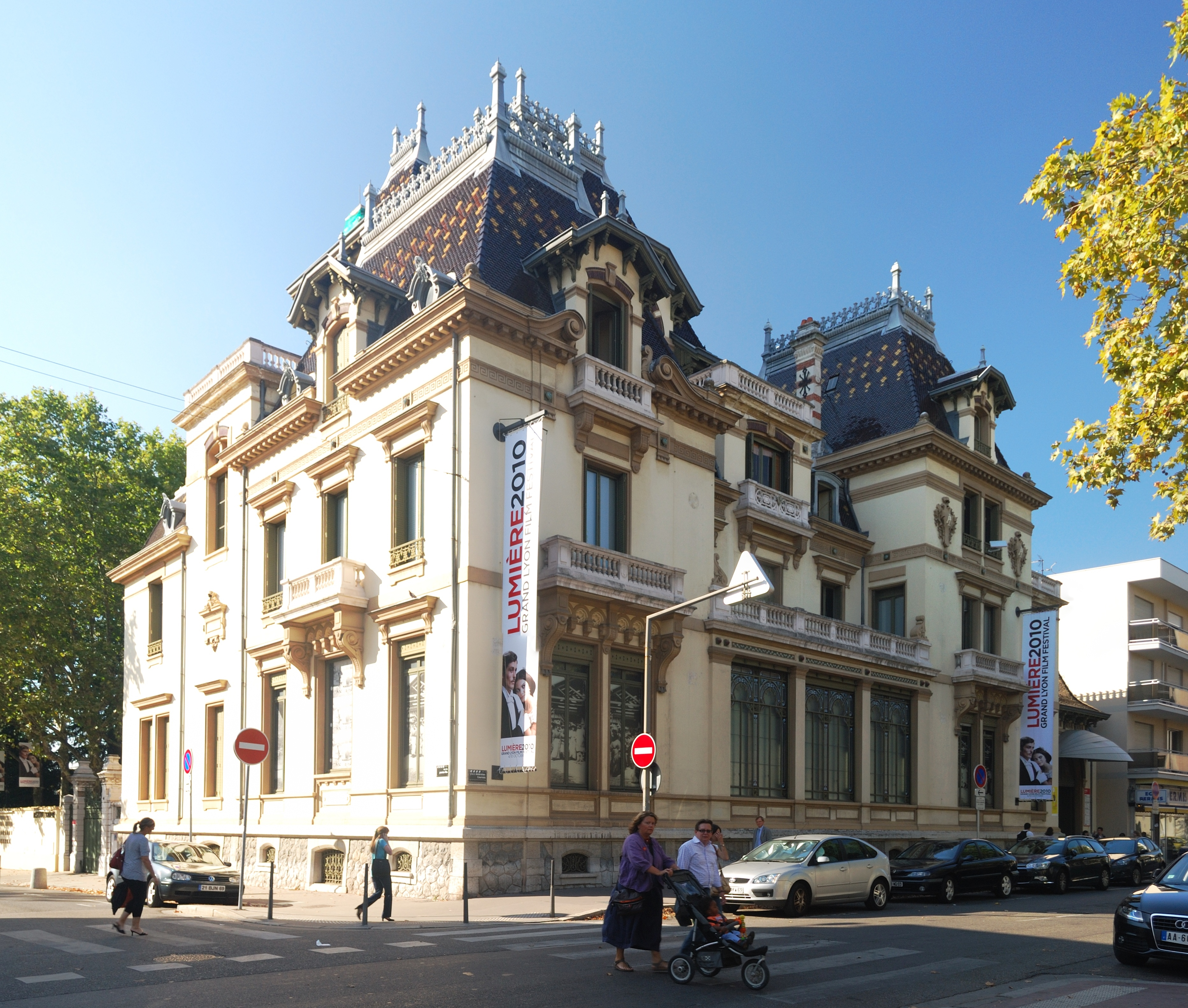
The Lumière Museum, displaying many early inventions of the Lumière brothers, in Lyon

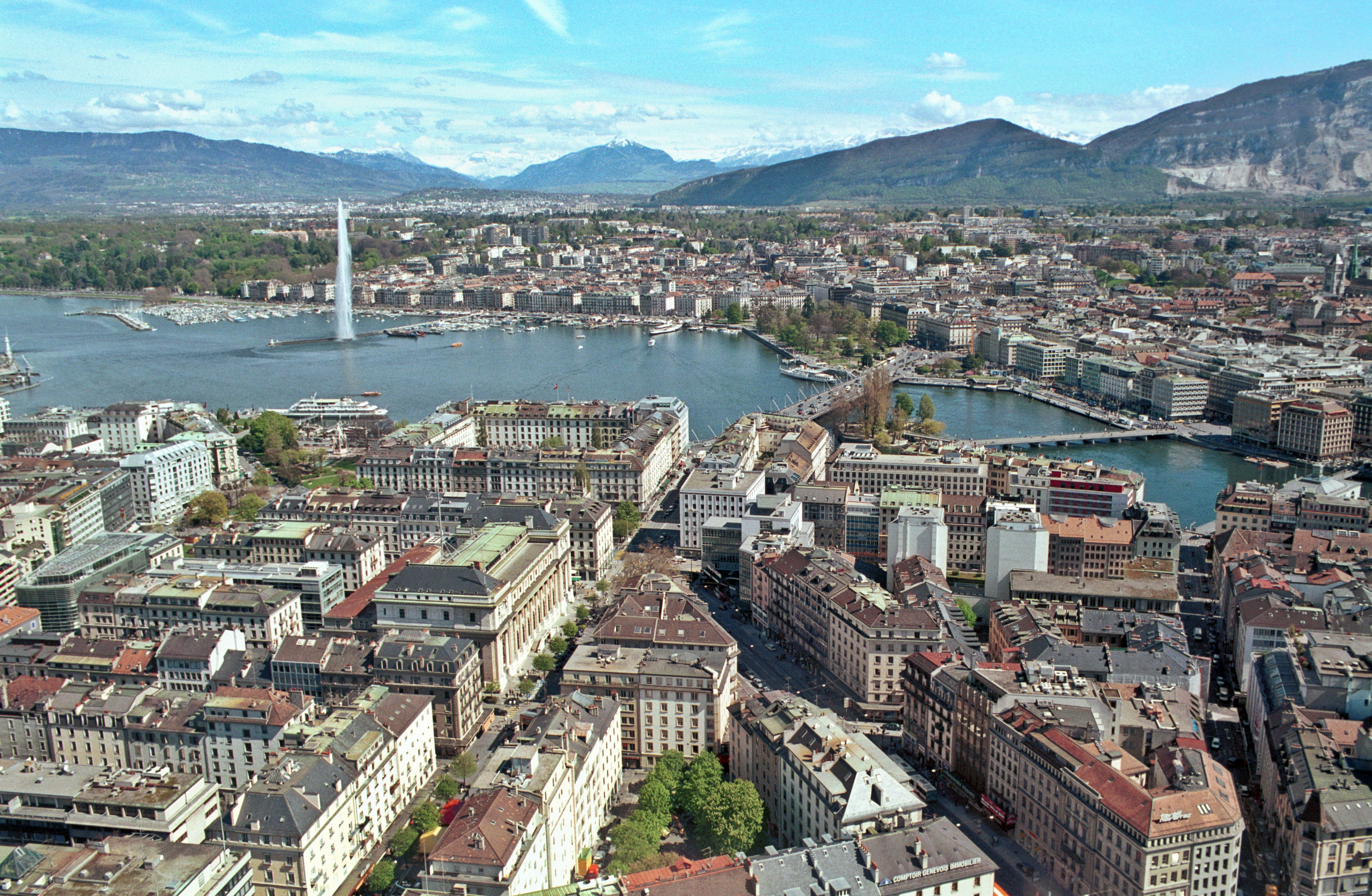
An aerial view of Geneva and the Lake Geneva, one of Arpitania's largest cities

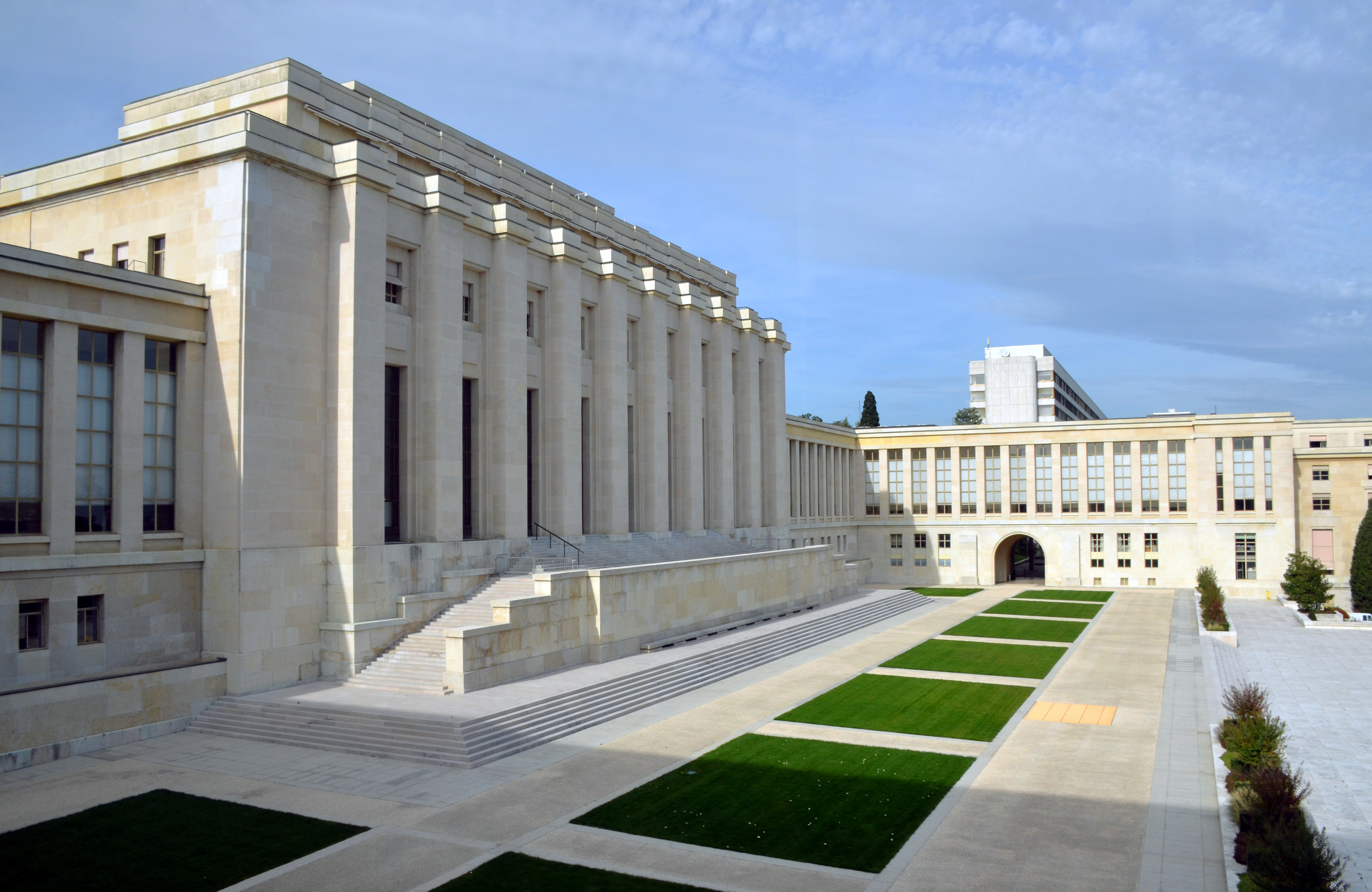
The Palais des Nations is the main building on the United Nations Office of Geneva, one of the four major offices of the UN

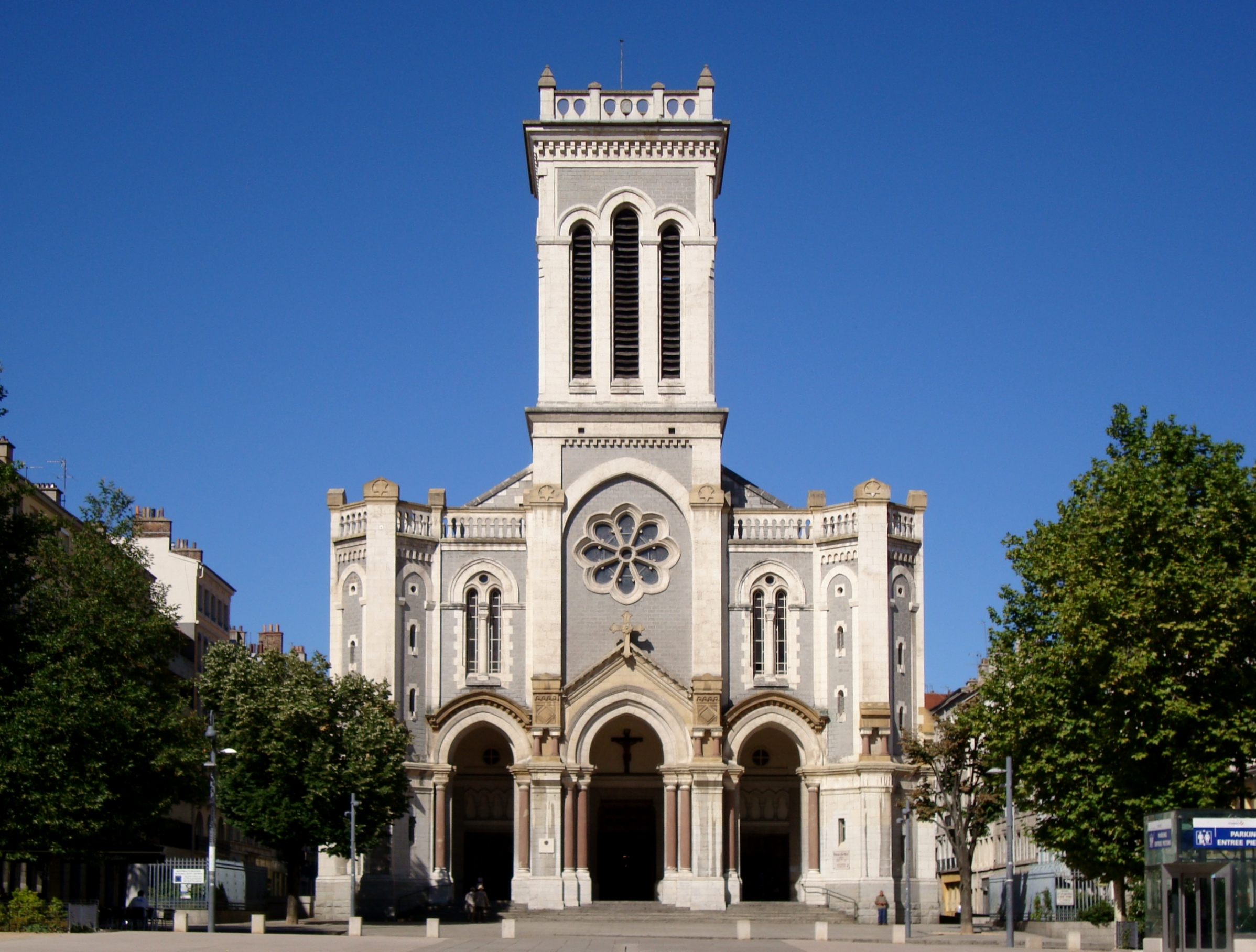
The Saint-Étienne Cathedral is one of the main attractions of Saint-Étienne

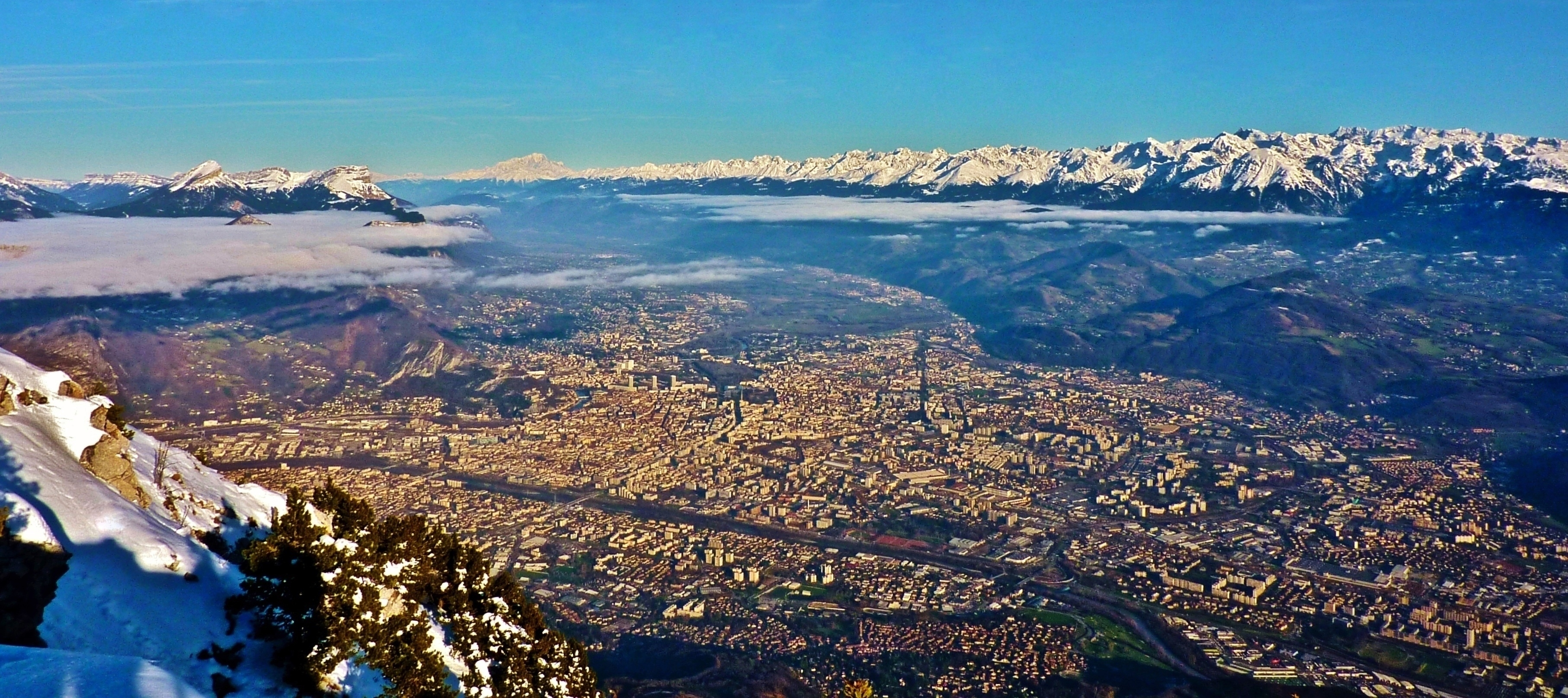
An aerial view of Grenoble, surrounded by the Dauphiné Alps

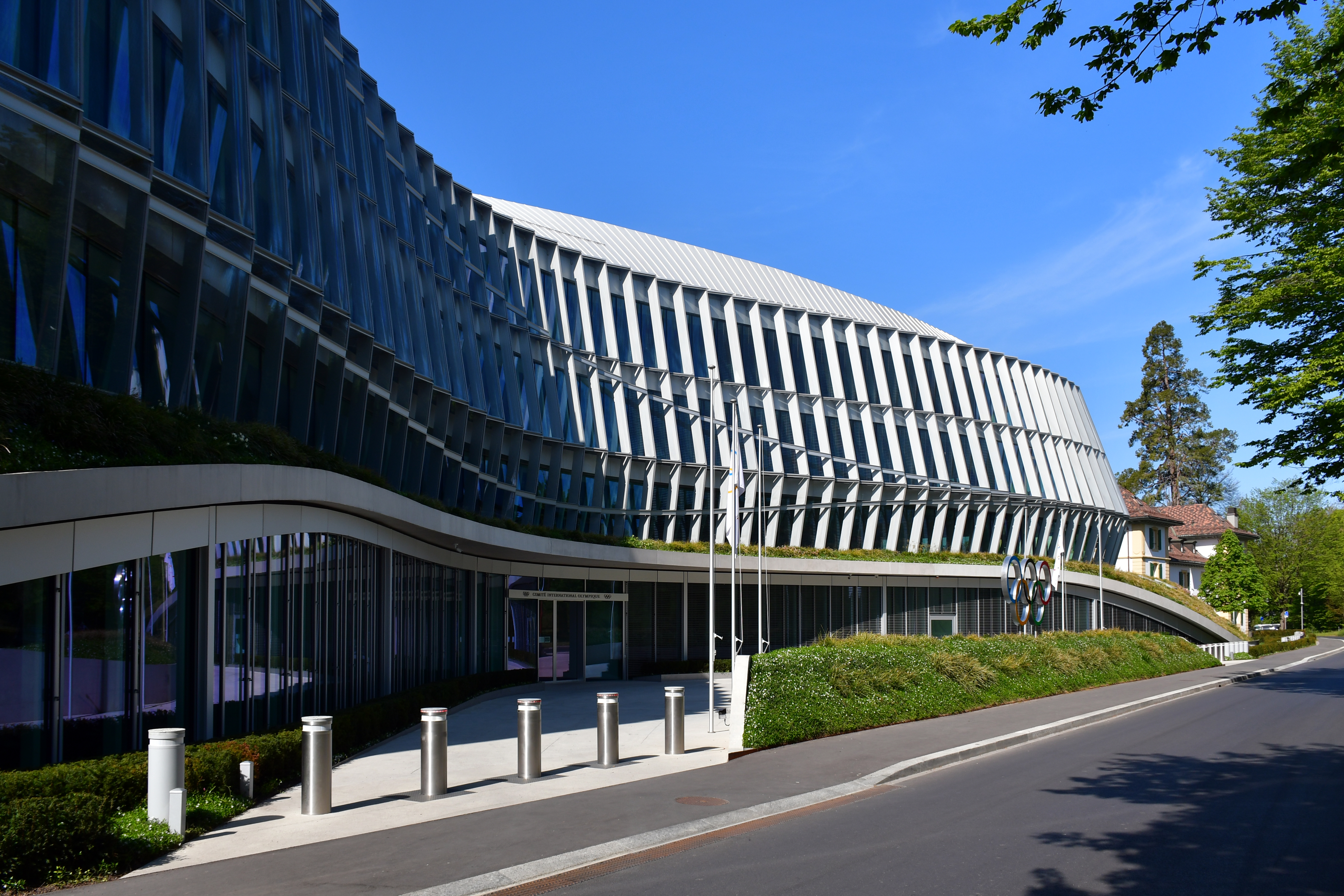
The seat of the International Olympic Committee in Lausanne

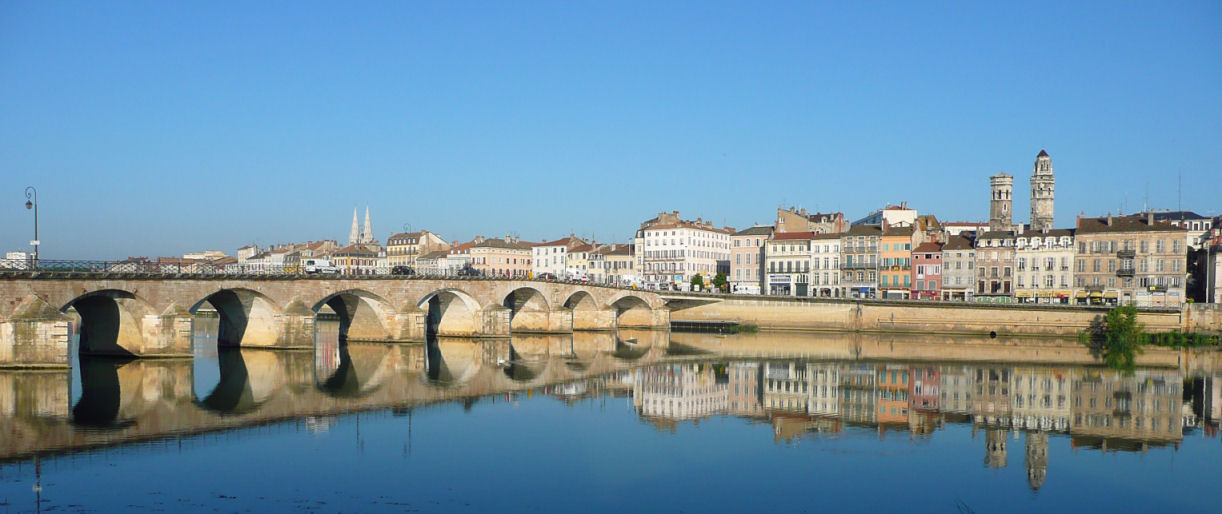
The Saône river in Mâcon

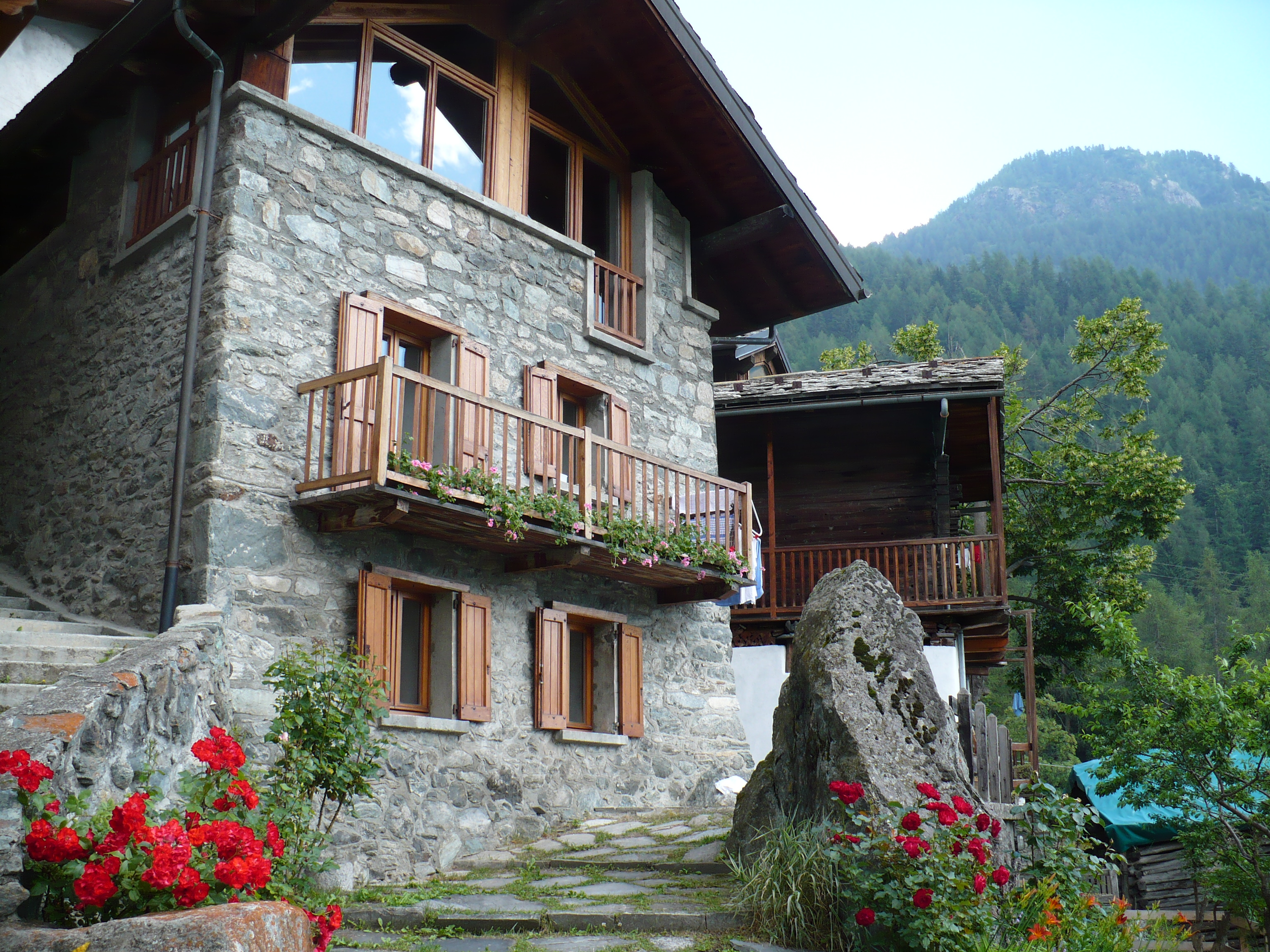
A typical Aostan house in Valtournenche

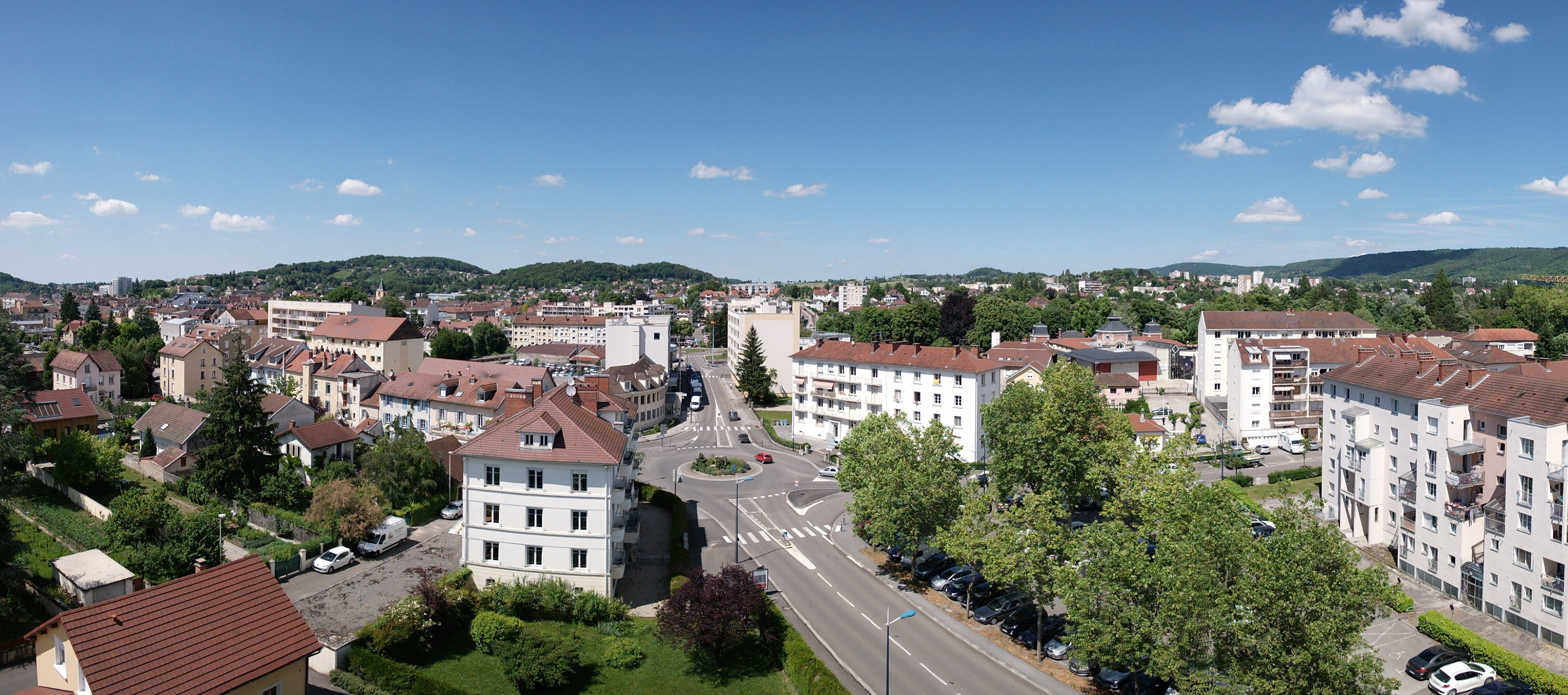
An aerial view of Lons-le-Saunier

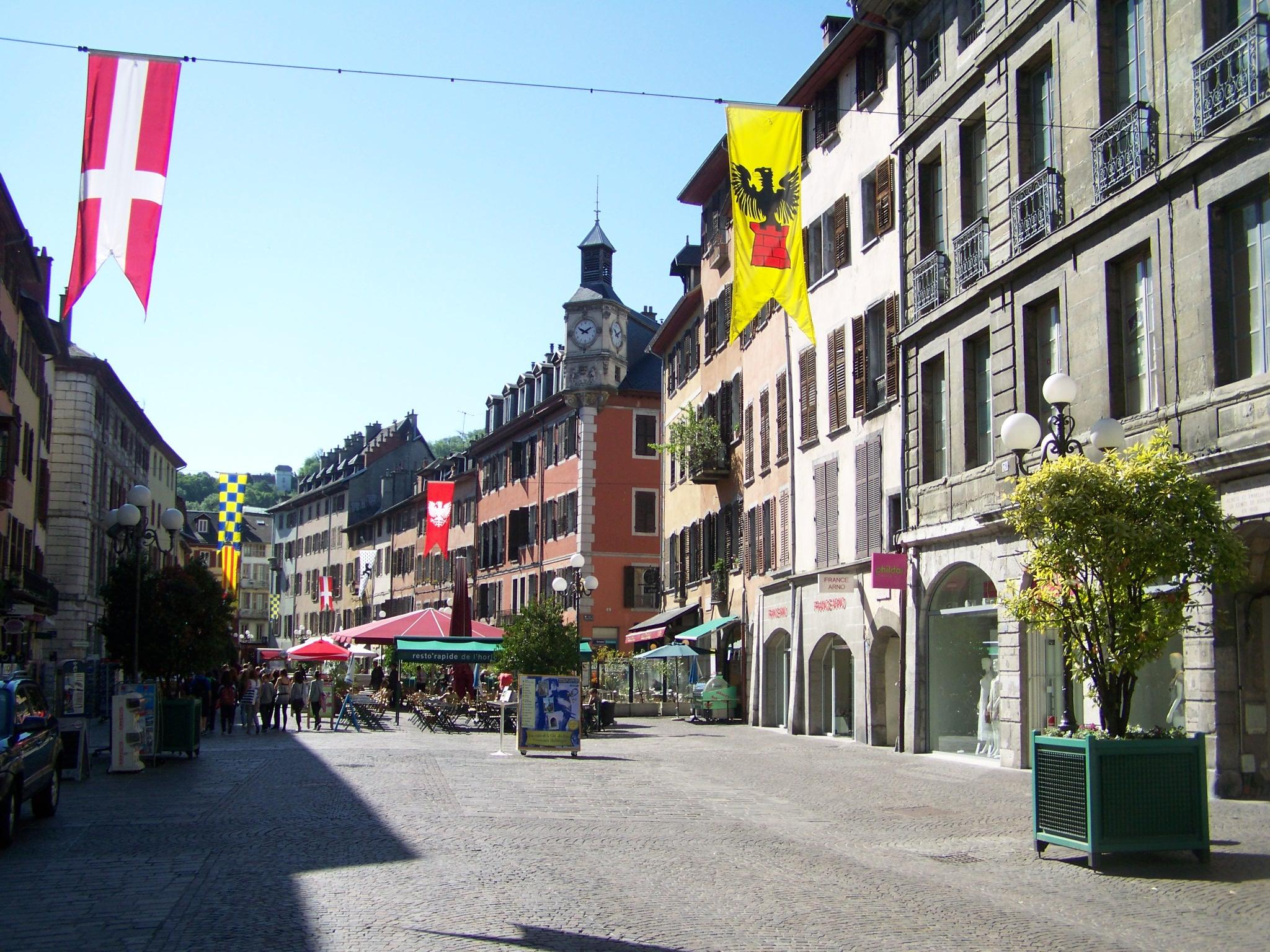
The place St-Léger is one of the main pedestrian streets of Chambéry

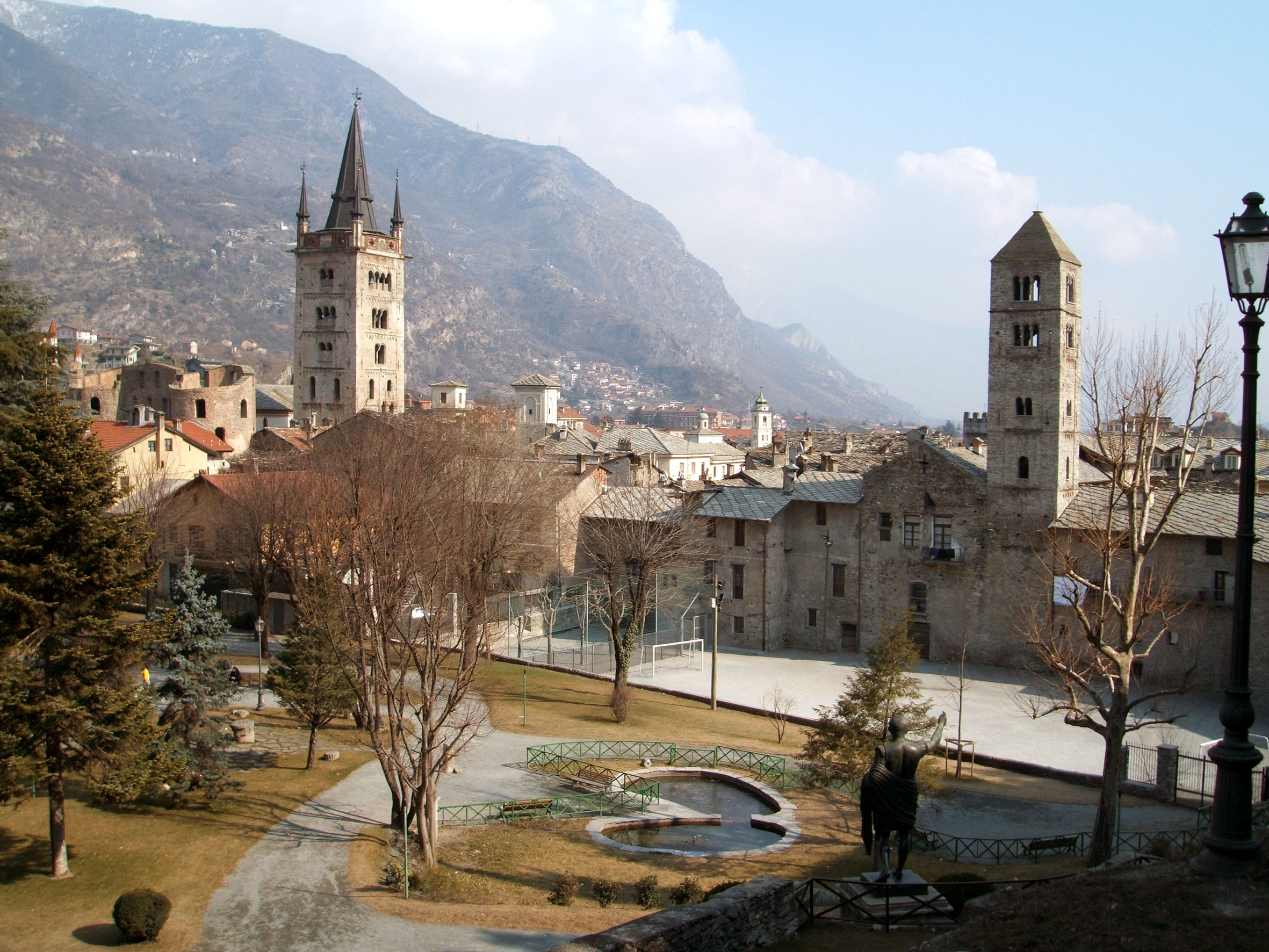
The centre of Susa, the largest town in the Arpitan Valleys

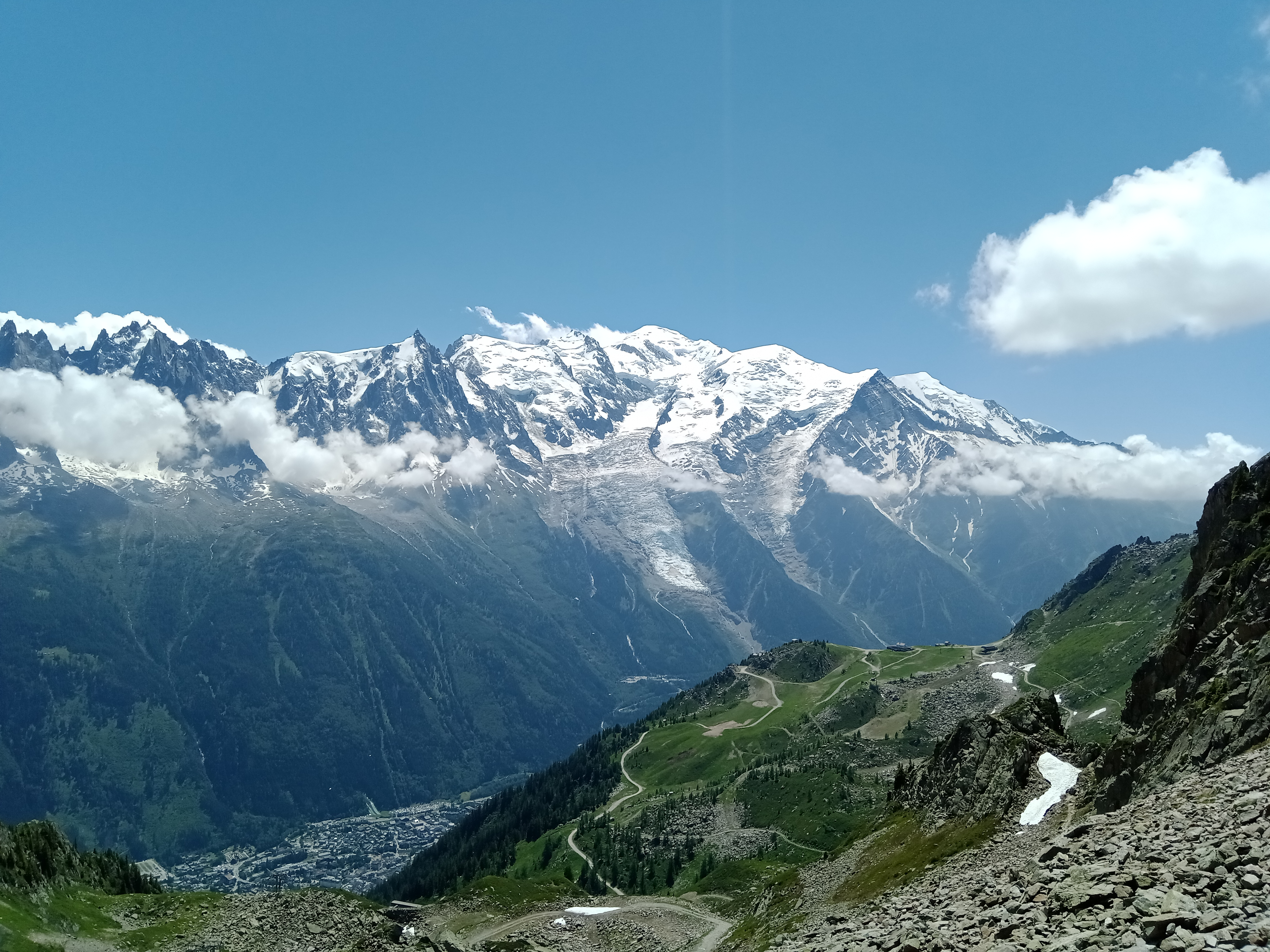
The Mont Blanc is Europe's highest mountain and is located on the border of Savoy and the Aosta Valley

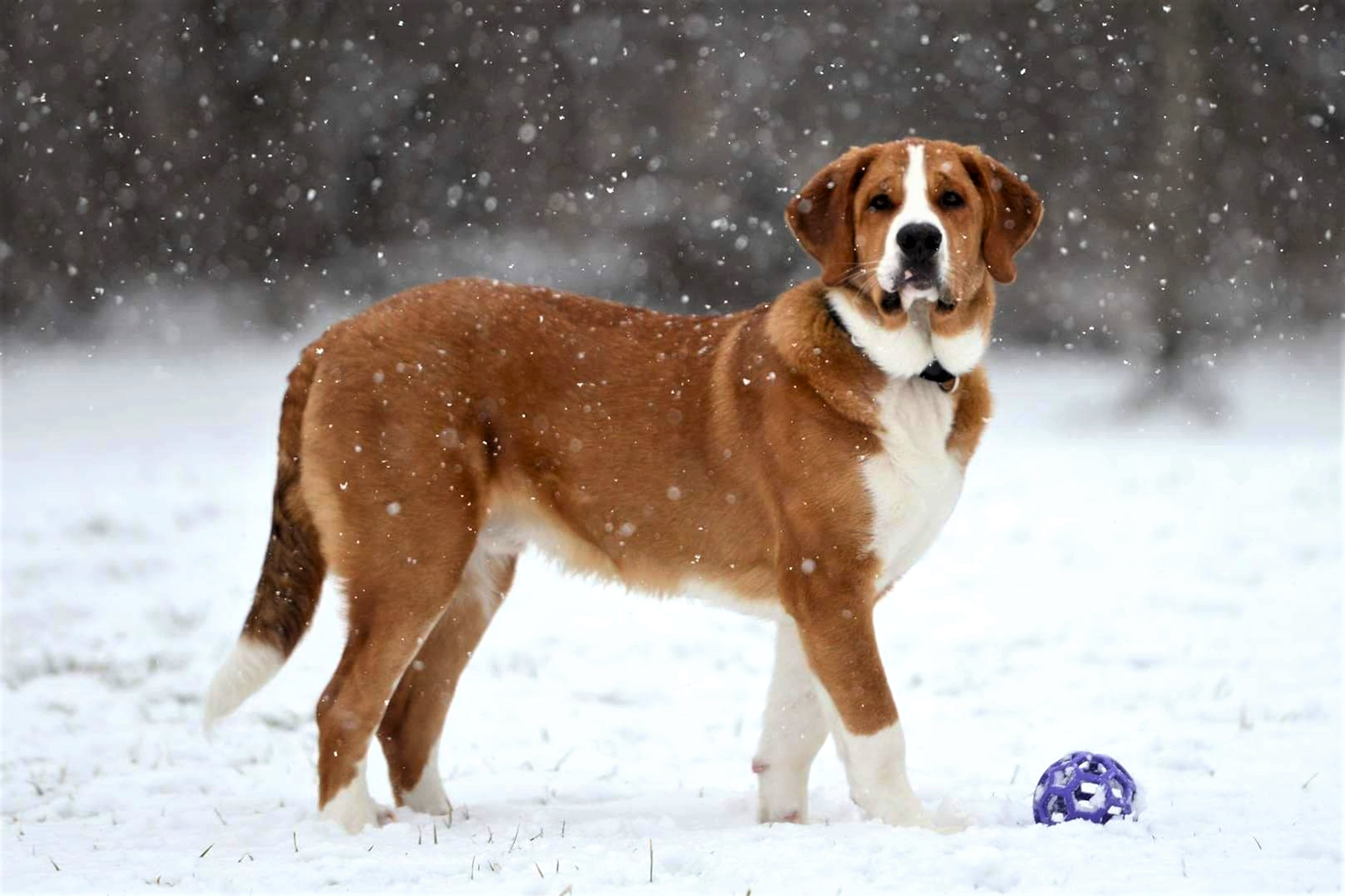
St. Bernard dogs have a long history of rescue activities in the Western Alps

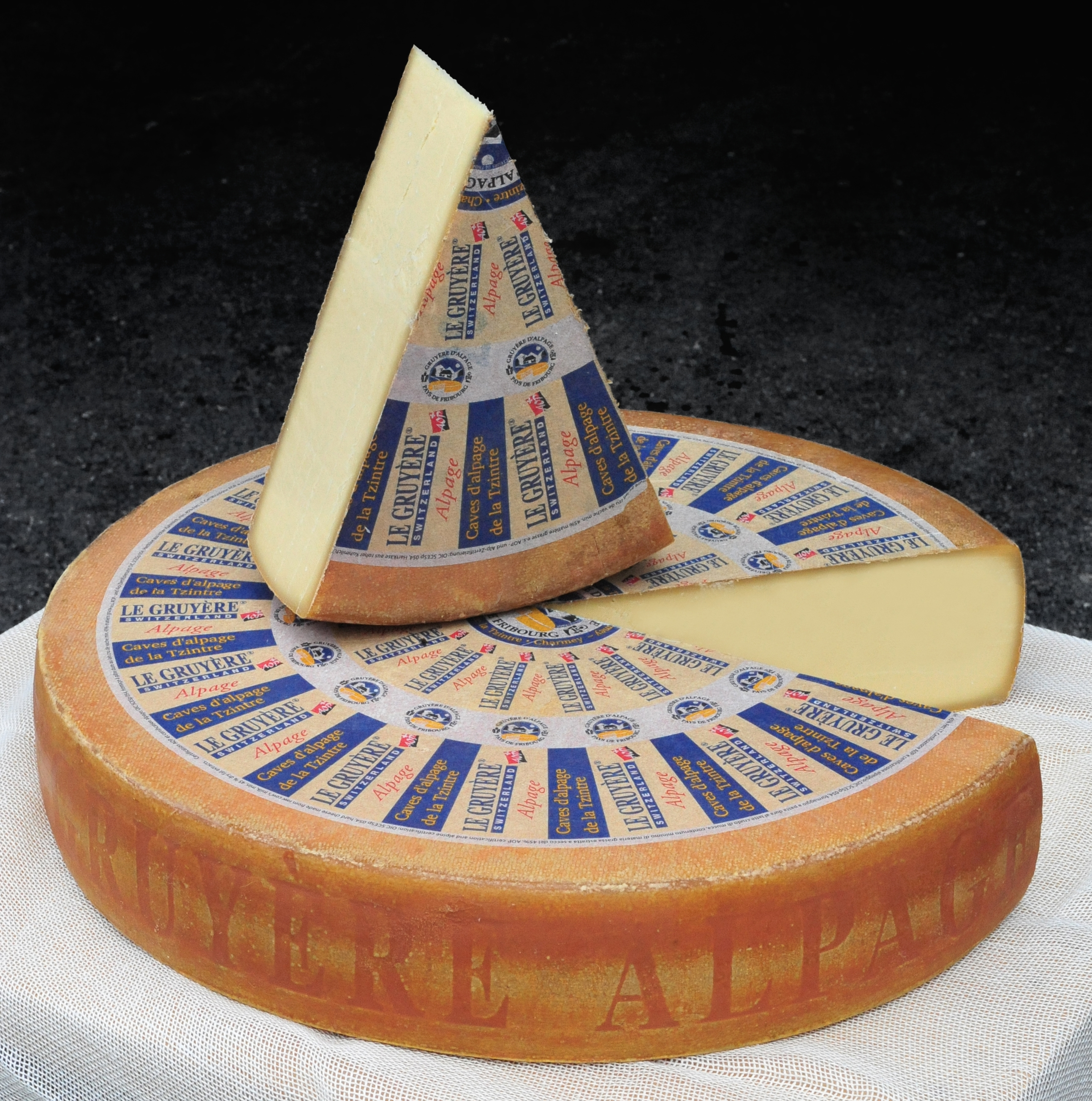
Gruyère cheese is a Swiss cheese from the Arpitan town of Gruyères

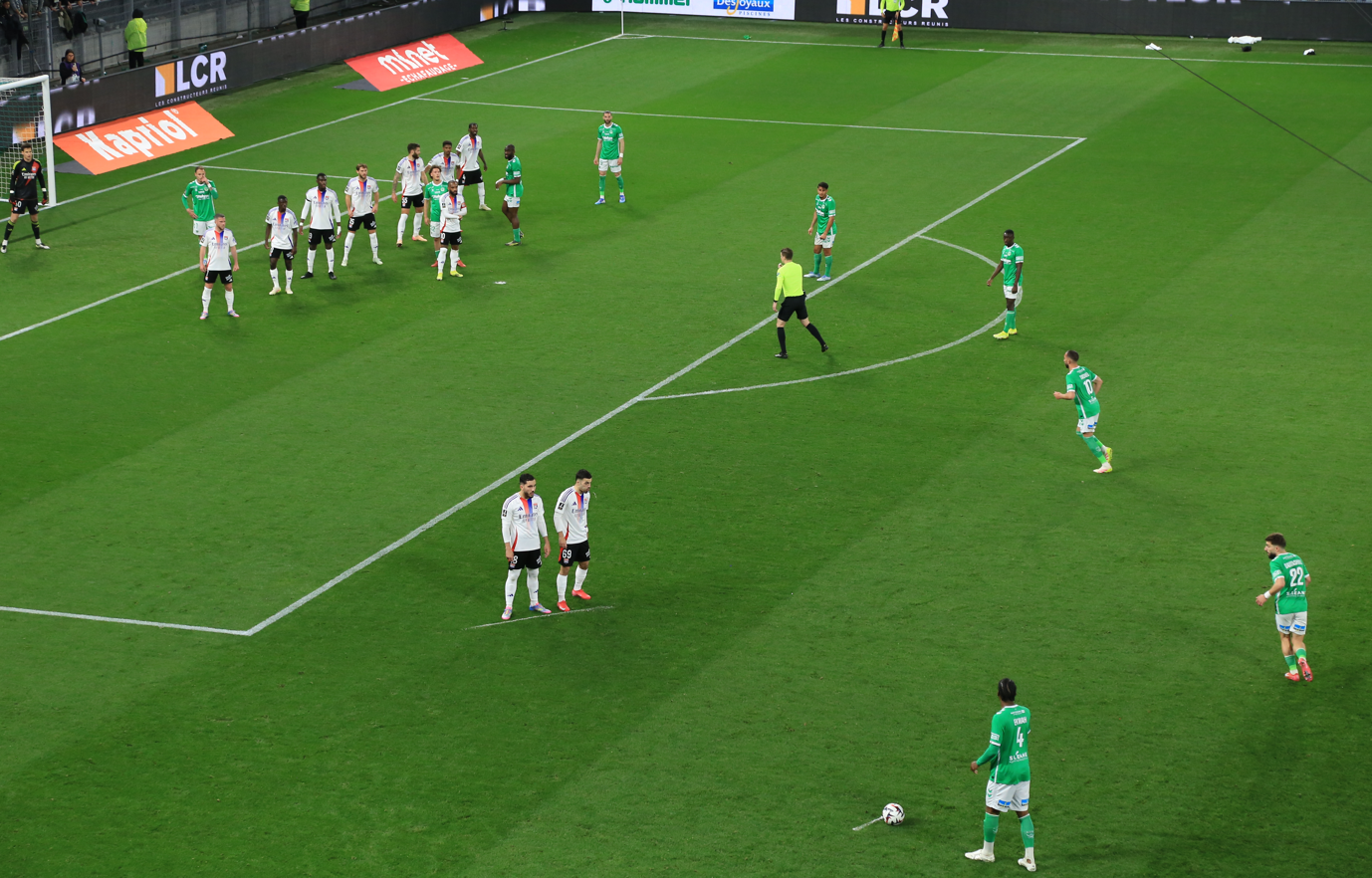
AS Saint-Étienne and Olympique Lyonnais are two of the most successful football teams in France

== See also ==
- Occitania
- Arpitan language

== Bibliography ==
- Jozé Harrieta [Joseph Henriet], La lingua arpitana, 1976.
- Mikael Bodlore-Penlaez, «Savoy and Aosta, heart of the Arpitan people» in Atlas of Stateless Nations in Europe: Minority People in Search of Recognition, Y Lolfa, 2011. ISBN 978-1-84771-379-7
- Les Alpes et leurs noms de lieux, 6000 ans d'histoire ? : Les appellations d'origine pré-indo-européenne., Paul-Louis Rousset, 1988, ISBN 2-901193-02-1
- Les mots de la montagne autour du Mont-Blanc, Hubert Bessat et Claudette Germi, Ed. Ellug, Programme Rhône-Alpes, Recherches en Sciences Humaines, 1991, ISBN 2-902709-68-4.
