= Raicam Industrie =

Raicam Industrie S.r.l. is an Italian multi-national group of OE automotive component and Aftermarket manufacturers, making clutches, brakes and hydraulic actuators.

== History ==
The company was founded in Manoppello, in eastern Italy, in 1982, by Nicola Di Sipio.

In 1995 a new challenge arrived: the design and the production of friction material for brake discs; it started from the taking over of the company Permafuse, located in Turin.

In 2005 Raicam enlarged its products range by taking over AP Automotive Products SrL, a company for the design, development and manufacturing of clutches; also in 2009 it took over AP Driveline Technologies Ltd, today named Raicam Clutch Ltd.

In 2008 for the first time Fiat 500 was assembled with Raicam clutches and brakes.

In 2015 Raicam has extended in the Asian market by setting up the first R&D centre in India, in order to support the local car manufacturing industries; in 2016 the Indian plant started its production for supplying the OE local market.

28 March 2018 – Raicam has completed the acquisition of the Hydraulic Actuator Business from Valeo. This acquisition includes the entire Passive Hydraulic Division of Valeo, with all the Human Resources, Intellectual Property, Manufacturing Sitesat Mondovì in Italy, Gemlik in Turkey and Nanjing in China. In India, Raicam will carry on the former local Passive Hydraulic Business of Valeo in its Sanand Site, which is already operative. Raicam, by integrating the division acquired in its organization, has now the capabilities and the resources to design and manufacture the entire clutch and actuation system and to facilitate the industrialization of the active hydraulic actuators.

== Products ==
- Brakes
- Clutches
- Hydraulic actuators

== Structure ==
The company is headquartered in Manoppello in the Italian region of Abruzzo, east of the Autostrada A25 and on the SS5. It has around 1.000 employees and 7 manufacturing plants in Italy, Turkey, India and China. It turns over around 180 million euros.

It has a technology centre in Bruzolo.

=== United Kingdom ===
The company has a small prototype development facility in Redditch, Raicam Clutch Ltd, on the Moons Moat North Industrial Estate, off the A4023 north of UK-NSI; but is mainly a test centre with a limited R&D department. This company (formerly Automotive Products or AP) was bought by Raicam in 2009, and moved from Leamington Spa in 2017.
