= Roure, Piedmont =

Roure Roure / Rore (Occitan) Rore (Piedmontese)
- Comune
- Comune di Roure
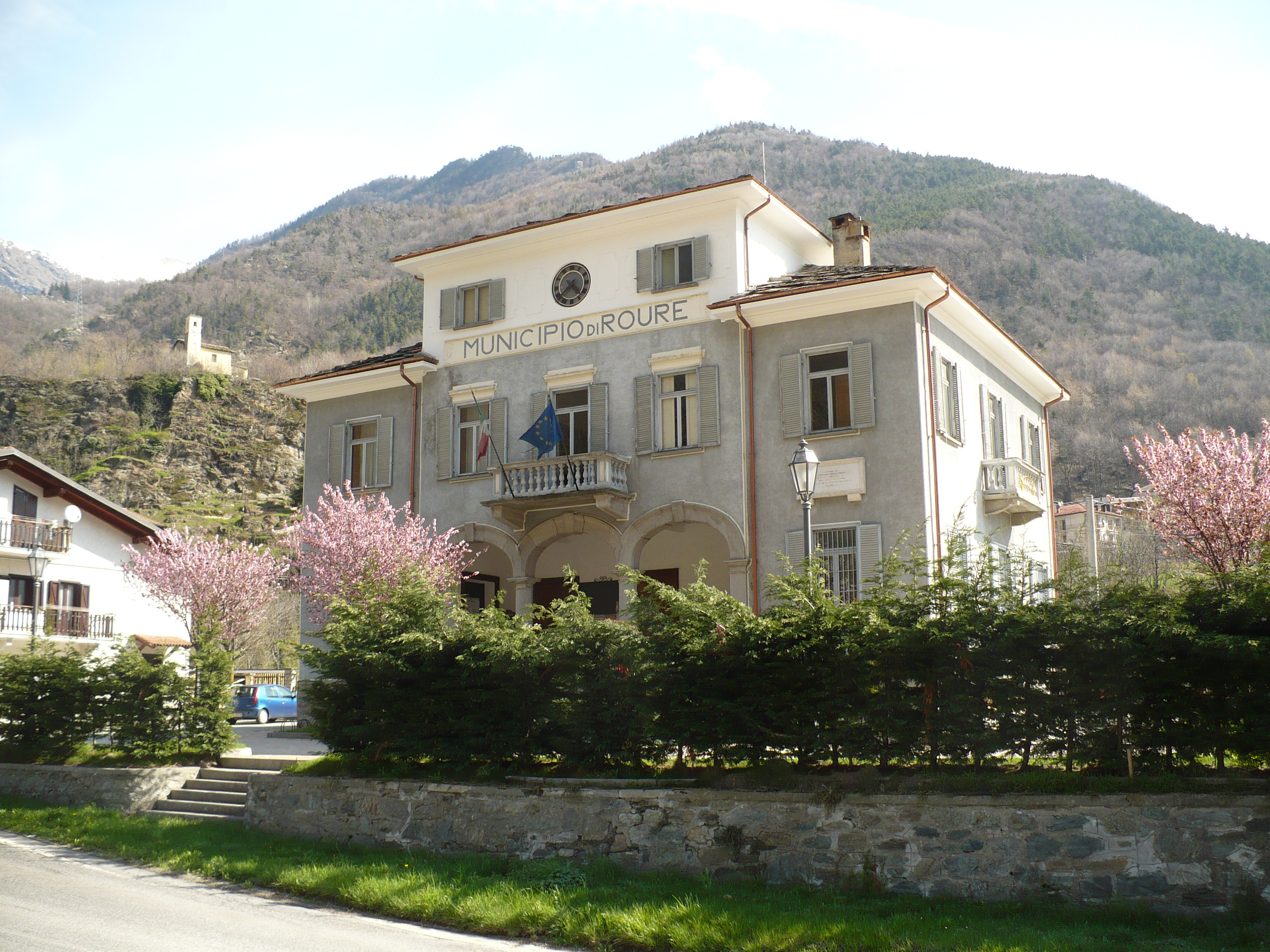

- Coat of arms

- Location within Italy Location within Piedmont
- Coordinates: 45°0′N 7°8′E
- Country: Italy
- Region: Piedmont
- Metropolitan city: Turin (TO)

Government
  - Mayor: Rino Tron

Area
  - Total: 59.37 km^{2} (22.92 sq mi)
- Elevation: 750 m (2,460 ft)

Population (30 June 2018)
  - Total: 811
  - Density: 13.7/km^{2} (35.4/sq mi)
- Demonym: Rouresi
- Time zone: UTC+1 (CET)
  - Summer (DST): UTC+2 (CEST)
- Postal code: 10060
- Dialing code: 0121
- Website: Official website

Roure (Italian: [roˈuːre]; Occitan: Roure or Rore [ˈruɾe]; Piedmontese: Rore) is a comune (municipality) in the Metropolitan City of Turin in the Italian region of Piedmont, located about 45 kilometres (28 mi) west of Turin in the Val Chisone.

Roure borders the following municipalities: Bussoleno, San Giorio di Susa, Mattie, Coazze, Fenestrelle, Perosa Argentina, Massello, and Perrero.

== Etymology ==
The toponym is Occitan for 'oak', derived from Latin rōbur, also signifying 'strength', 'power', 'hardness'.

== Geography ==
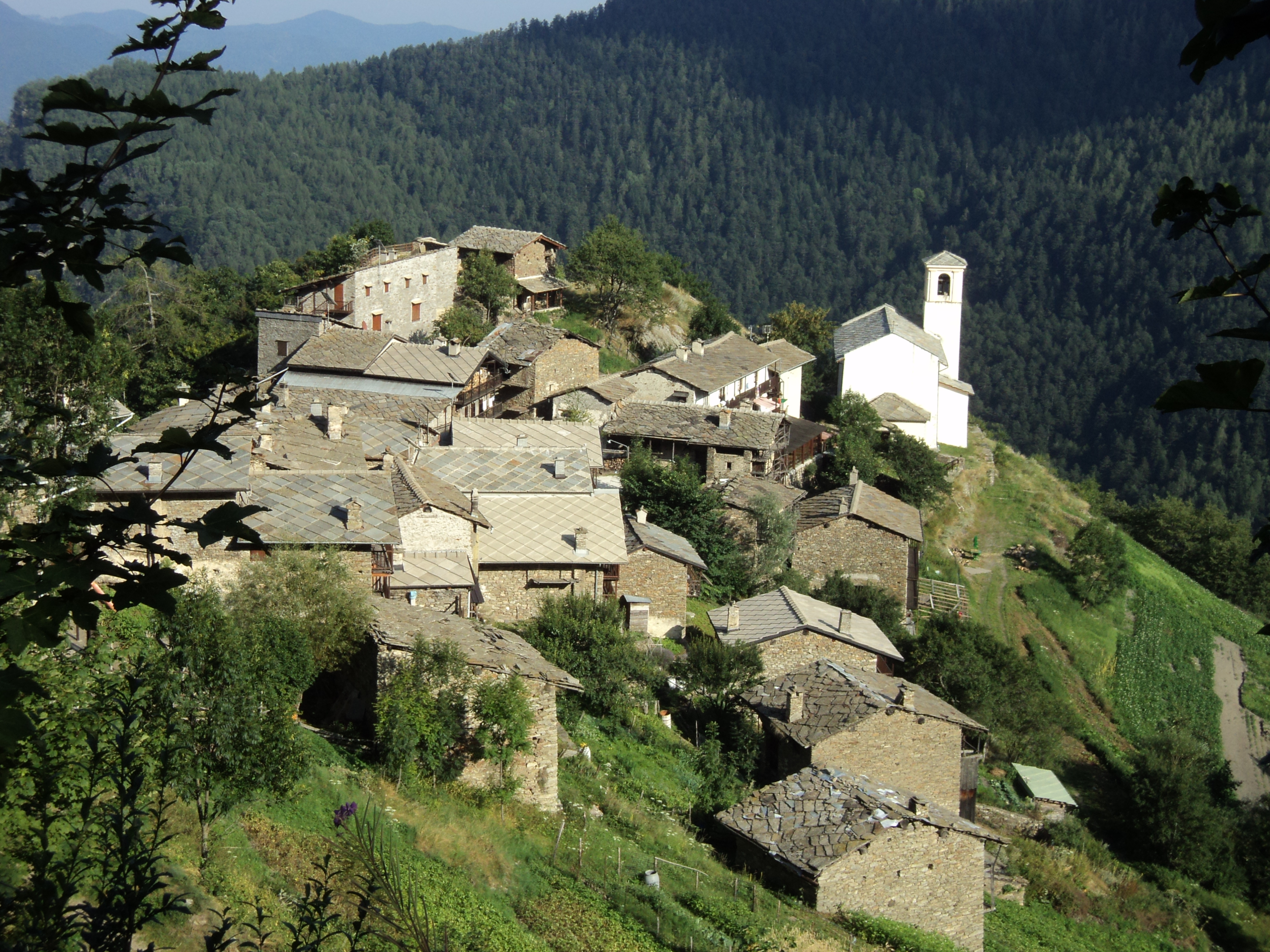
View of the village of Balma

The comune is located in the middle of the Val Chisone and mainly extends along the course of the Chisone stream. The highest elevation in the municipal territory is Mount Orsiera (2,890 metres, 9,480 ft).

On the orographic right, near the Roreto hamlet, the Bourcet Valley opens up, characterized by a very rugged and wild landscape in its lower part, which, after approximately two thousand meters of elevation gain, culminates in the peak of Becco dell'Aquila (2,809 m, 9,216 ft). At the beginning of the valley, you can find the "Nicola Ciardelli" via ferrata and numerous climbing routes of various difficulties (up to grade VII).

== History ==
During the fascist period, the name of the comune, deemed too influenced by the French regime and not sufficiently by the Italian one, was changed first to Roreto in 1937 and then to Roreto Chisone in 1939. This resulted in the loss of its original etymology, although the oak in the municipal coat of arms was retained. This name remained unchanged until 1975 when the residents, through a referendum, approved the municipal authorities' proposal to restore the previous name.

== Hamlets, villages, and tourist areas of interest ==
The comune does not have a residential centre with the same name, but it is composed of four main hamlets: Castel del Bosco, Balma, Roreto, and Villaretto, arranged starting from Castel del Bosco, being the lowest among them in the Chisone Valley, bordering the comune of Perosa Argentina. The sequence continues up to Villaretto, situated to the Northwest compared to the others, and bordering the comune of Fenestrelle. The municipal seat is located in the Balma hamlet.

In addition to the four main hamlets, there are many other small villages, mostly uninhabited. Among these, Serre del Bosco, Noufliere, Vignal, Piccolo and Gran Faetto can be identified.

For sports enthusiasts, in the Bourcet Valley, accessible by crossing the bridge on the left at the end of Roreto (when heading Northwest along the SS23 to Colle del Sestriere), there are numerous climbing routes and a via ferrata, the Nicola Ciardelli's Via Ferrata.
