= Vâlsoanin dialect =

Dialect of Arpitan

Vâlsoanin
- Native to: Italy
- Region: Piedmont
- Language family: Indo-European: Italic; Latino-Faliscan; Latin; Romance; Italo-Western; Western Romance; Gallo-Iberian?; Gallo-Romance; Gallo-Rhaetian?; Arpitan–Oïl; Franco-Provençal; Vâlsoanin
- Writing system: Latin

Language codes
- ISO 639-3: None (mis)
- Glottolog: None

Vâlsoanin is a dialect of Arpitan (Francoprovençal) spoken in the Soana Valley, located in northwestern Piedmont, Italy.

== Description ==
Vâlsoanin encompasses the set of shared lexical and linguistic features characterizing the Franco-Provençal varieties of the Arpitan Valleys in northwestern Piedmont, as opposed to the neighboring Valdôtain dialect of the Aosta Valley.

Several Vâlsoanin lexical forms diffused into the wider Franco-Provençal linguistic continuum before later being incorporated into regional varieties of French-speaking areas.
