= Bussoleno =

Bussoleno Bussolin (Piedmontese) Bussolin (Arpitan) Busoulin (French)
- Comune
- Comune di Bussoleno
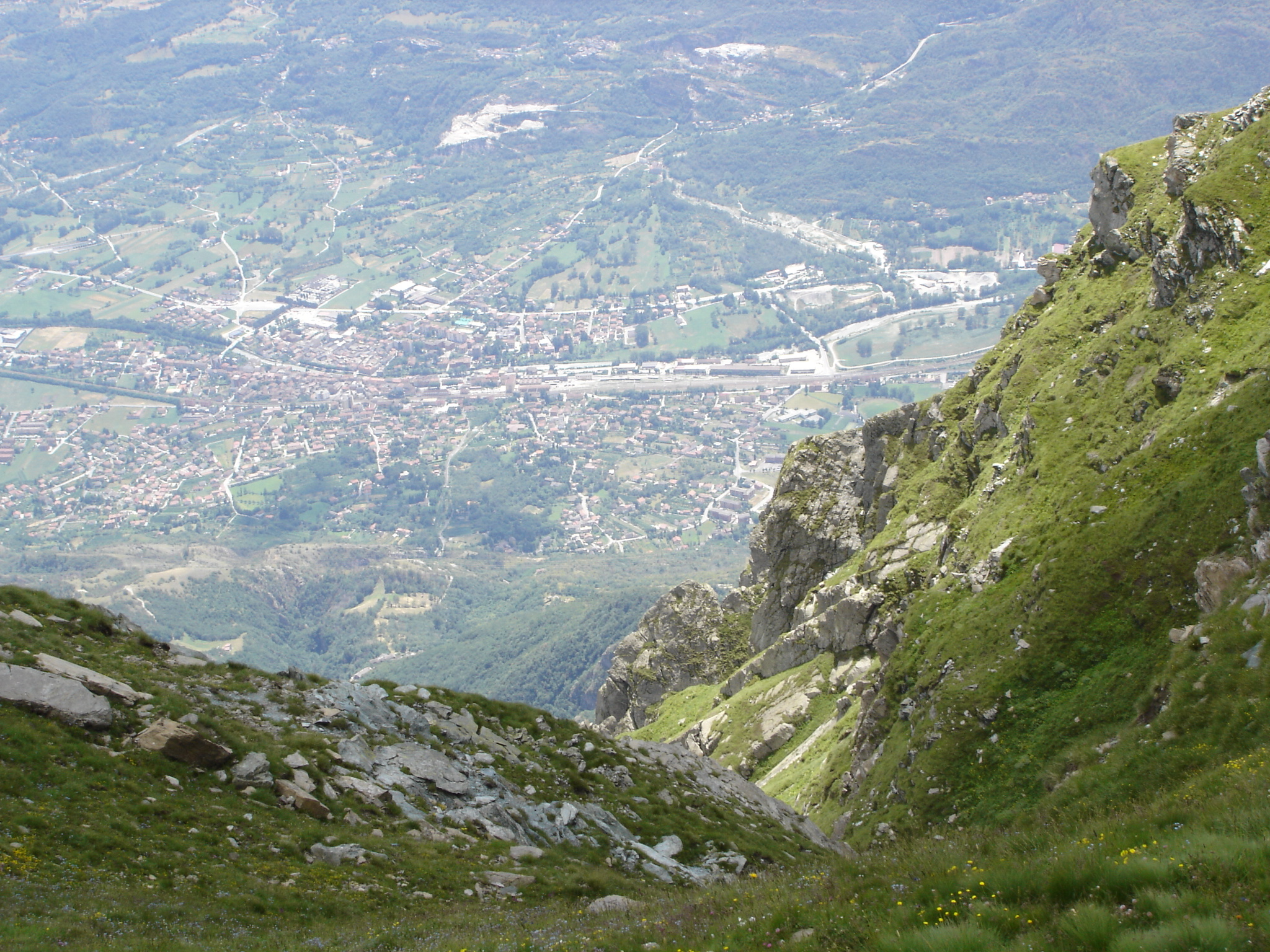

- Coat of arms

- Location within Italy Location within Piedmont
- Coordinates: 45°8′N 7°9′E
- Country: Italy
- Region: Piedmont
- Metropolitan city: Turin (TO)
- Frazioni: Amprimo, Foresto, Baroni, Bessetti, Meitre, Ballai, Arbrea, Grangie, Falcemagna, Tignai, San Lorenzo, Argiassera, Ricchettera, Pietra Bianca, Santa Petronilla, Prapontin, San Basilio

Government
  - Mayor: Bruna Consolini

Area
  - Total: 37.07 km^{2} (14.31 sq mi)
- Elevation: 440 m (1,440 ft)

Population (1-1-2017)
  - Total: 6,037
  - Density: 162.9/km^{2} (421.8/sq mi)
- Demonym: Bussolenese(i)
- Time zone: UTC+1 (CET)
  - Summer (DST): UTC+2 (CEST)
- Postal code: 10053
- Dialing code: 0122
- Patron saint: Assumption of Mary
- Saint day: August 15
- Website: Official website

Bussoleno (Piedmontese: Bussolin, Arpitan: Bussolin, French: Busoulin) is a comune (municipality) in the Metropolitan City of Turin, in the Italian region of Piedmont. It is located about 45 kilometres (28 mi) west of Turin.

Bussoleno borders the following municipalities: Usseglio, Mompantero, Chianocco, Susa, San Giorio di Susa, Mattie, Roure.
