= Fiorenzo Toso =

Italian academic and linguist (1962–2022)

- Born: 20 February 1962; Arenzano, Italy
- Died: 24 September 2022 (aged 60); Arenzano, Liguria, Italy
- Education: University of Genoa; Saarland University; University of Perugia
- Occupations: Professor; Linguist

Fiorenzo Toso (20 February 1962 – 24 September 2022) was an Italian academic, linguist, and dialectologist.

== Life and career ==
Toso graduated from the University of Genoa with a degree in foreign language and literature in 1988, then earned a degree in Italian philology from Saarland University in 2000. In 2007, he earned a doctorate in Romance studies and general linguistics from the University of Perugia. From 2007 to 2022, he taught at the University of Sassari, first as an associate professor and subsequently as a full professor.

A specialist in the linguistics of Ligurian, Toso collaborated with the Lessico etimologico italiano in Saarland. On both Ligurian and the Genoese dialect, he wrote numerous publications in both Italian and foreign journals. He also wrote several monographs.

Toso also researched the phenomenon of language contact, with special attention to language islands in the Mediterranean basin, from the colonial Ligurian dialect to Tabarchino. In addition, he conducted etymological research on linguistic minorities in Italy and Europe. Thanks to his research on Tabarchino, he was awarded honorary citizenship of Calasetta and Carloforte.

Fiorenzo Toso died from brain cancer in Arenzano, on 24 September 2022, at the age of 60.

== Works ==
- Vocabolario delle parlate liguri (1985)
- Letteratura genovese e ligure. Profilo storico e antologia (1989)
- Gli ispanismi nei dialetti liguri (1993)
- Storia linguistica della Liguria. Dalle origini al 1528 (1995)
- La letteratura in genovese. Ottocento anni di storia, arte, cultura e lingua in Liguria (1999)
- Il tabarchino. Strutture, evoluzione storica, aspetti sociolinguistici, in Il bilinguismo tra conservazione e minaccia. Esempi e presupposti per interventi di politica linguistica e di educazione bilingue (2004)
- Dizionario Etimologico Storico Tabarchino. Volume I, a-cüzò (2004)
- Le eteroglossie interne. Aspetti e problemi (2005)
- Lingue d'Europa. La pluralità linguistica dei Paesi europei fra passato e presente (2006)
- Liguria linguistica. Dialettologia, storia della lingua e letteratura nel Ponente. Saggi 1987-2005 (2006)
- Le minoranze linguistiche in Italia (2008)
- Linguistica di aree laterali ed estreme. Contatto, interferenza, colonie linguistiche e “isole” culturali nel Mediterraneo occidentale (2008)
- Circolazioni linguistiche e culturali nello spazio mediterraneo. Miscellanea di studi (2008)
- La letteratura ligure in genovese e nei dialetti locali. Profilo storico e antologia (2009)
- La Sardegna che non parla sardo (2012)
- Le parlate liguri della Provenza. Il dialetto figun tra storia e memoria (2014)
- Parole e viaggio. Itinerari nel lessico italiano tra etimologia e storia (2015)
- Piccolo dizionario etimologico ligure (2015)
- Il mondo grande. Rotte interlinguistiche e presenze comunitarie del genovese d'oltremare. Dal Mediterraneo al Mar Nero, dall'Atlantico al Pacifico (2020)
- Ra cittara zeneize. Poesie scelte (2020)
