= Bruzolo =

Bruzolo Bruzeul (Piedmontese) Bërsoel (Arpitan)
- Comune
- Comune di Bruzolo
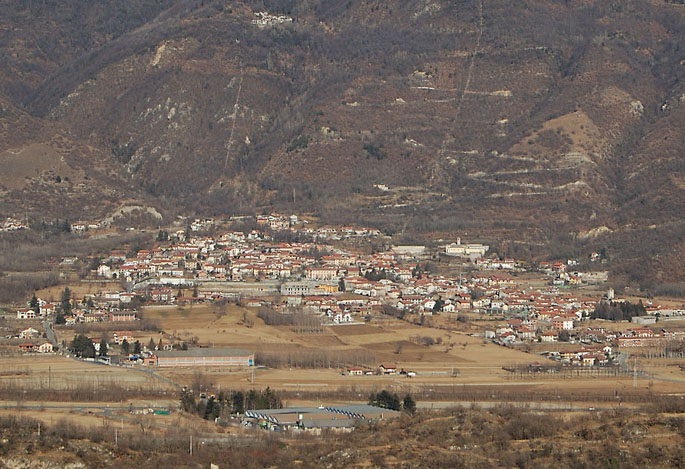

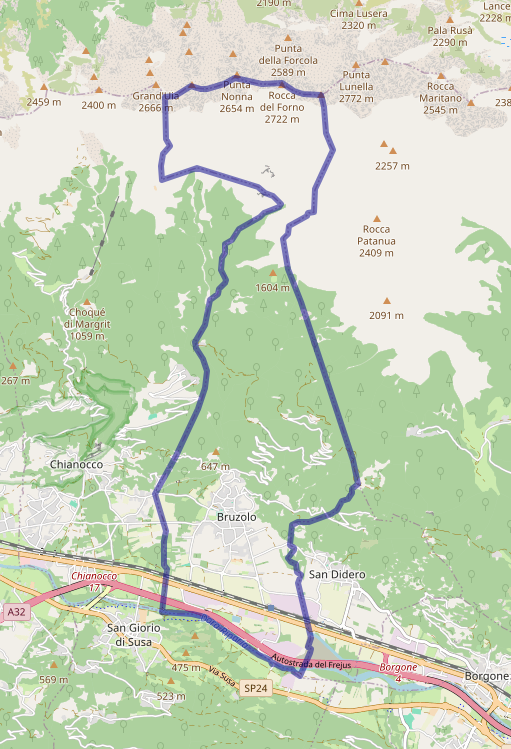

- Location within Italy Location within Piedmont
- Coordinates: 45°8′36″N 7°11′39″E
- Country: Italy
- Region: Piedmont
- Metropolitan city: Turin (TO)

Government
  - Mayor: Chiara Borgis

Area
  - Total: 12.56 km^{2} (4.85 sq mi)
- Elevation: 455 m (1,493 ft)

Population (1 January 2017)
  - Total: 1,525
  - Density: 121.4/km^{2} (314.5/sq mi)
- Demonym: Bruzolese(i)
- Time zone: UTC+1 (CET)
  - Summer (DST): UTC+2 (CEST)
- Postal code: 10050
- Dialing code: 011
- Website: Official website

Bruzolo (Piedmontese: Bruzeul, Arpitan: Bërsoel) (pop. 1,525 as of 1 January 2017)) is a comune of the Metropolitan City of Turin in the Italian region of Piedmont. Located some 43 kilometres (27 mi) west of Turin, in the lower Susa Valley, it is a member of the Comunità Montana Bassa Valle di Susa e Val Cenischia. Bruzolo borders the municipalities of Usseglio, Condove, Chianocco, San Didero, and San Giorio di Susa.

The town of Bruzolo is the main population centre of the commune and is its capoluogo. It stands to the left of the river Dora Riparia on an alluvial fan formed over the millennia by debris deposited by the Pissaglio and other minor torrents. The municipal territory also includes farmland and factories on the flood-plain of the Dora Riparia, and extends over the forested southern slopes of Punta Lunella, elevation 2,772 metres (9,094 ft), where there is a scattering of hamlets: Campobenedetto, Meisonardi, Comba, Bigiardi, Lunera, Coletto, Chiotetti, Seinera and Combette.

== See also ==
- Treaty of Bruzolo
