= Villar Focchiardo =

Villar Focchiardo Ël Vilé (Piedmontese) Vilar Fuciard (Arpitan)
- Comune
- Comune di Villar Focchiardo
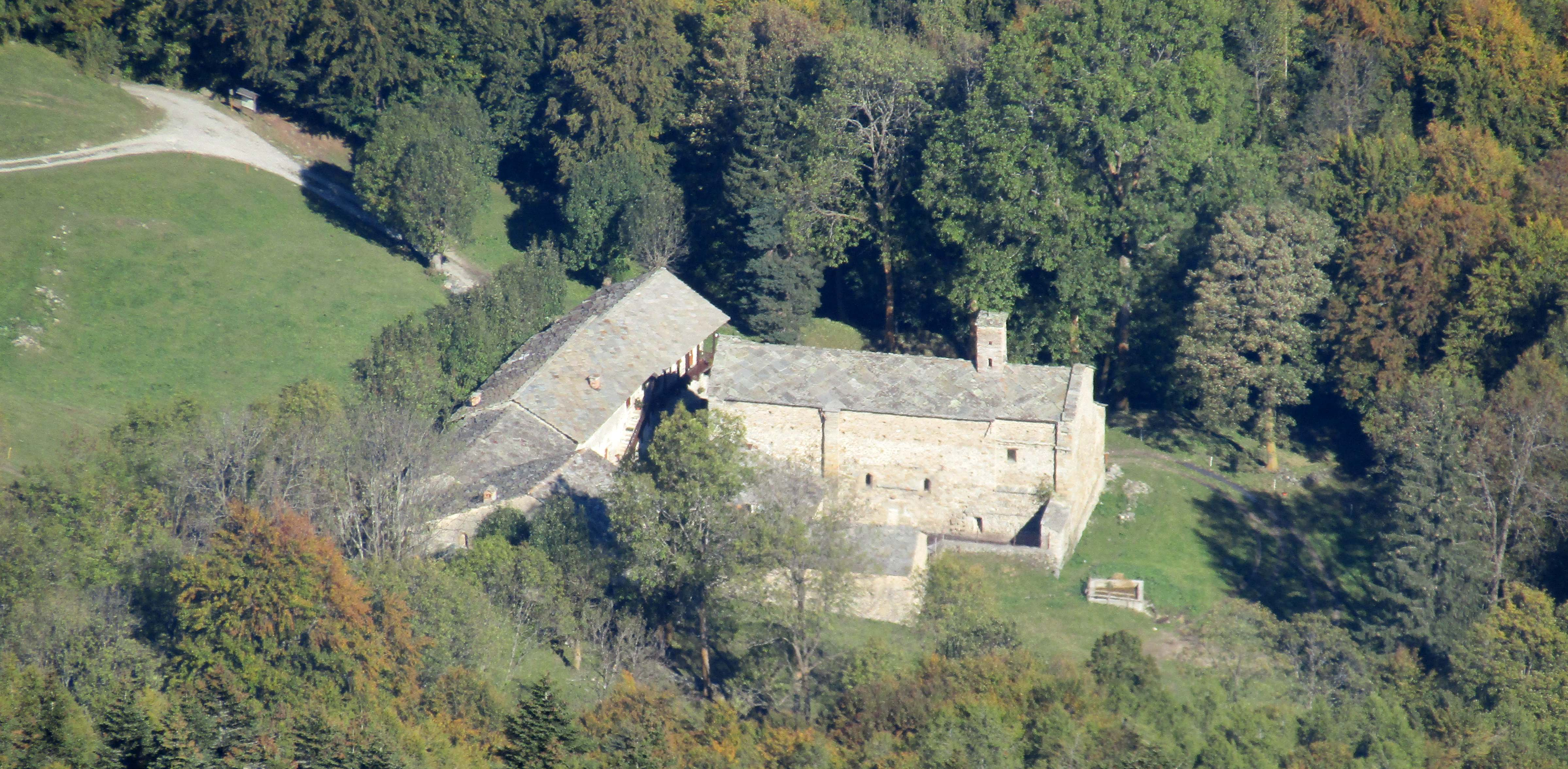
- Montebenedetto Charterhouse

- Location within Italy Location within Piedmont
- Coordinates: 45°7′N 7°14′E
- Country: Italy
- Region: Piedmont
- Metropolitan city: Turin (TO)

Government
  - Mayor: Emilio Stefano Chiaberto

Area
  - Total: 25.6 km^{2} (9.9 sq mi)

Population (Dec. 2004)
  - Total: 2,041
  - Density: 79.7/km^{2} (206/sq mi)
- Demonym: Villarfocchiardesi
- Time zone: UTC+1 (CET)
  - Summer (DST): UTC+2 (CEST)
- Postal code: 10050
- Dialing code: 011
- Website: Official website

Villar Focchiardo (Piedmontese: Ël Vilé, Arpitan: Vilar Fuciard) is a comune (municipality) in the Metropolitan City of Turin in the Italian region Piedmont, located about 35 km west of Turin.
