= Sant'Antonino di Susa =

Sant'Antonino di Susa San-Tunin (Piedmontese) Santantunin (Arpitan)
- Comune
- Comune di Sant'Antonino di Susa
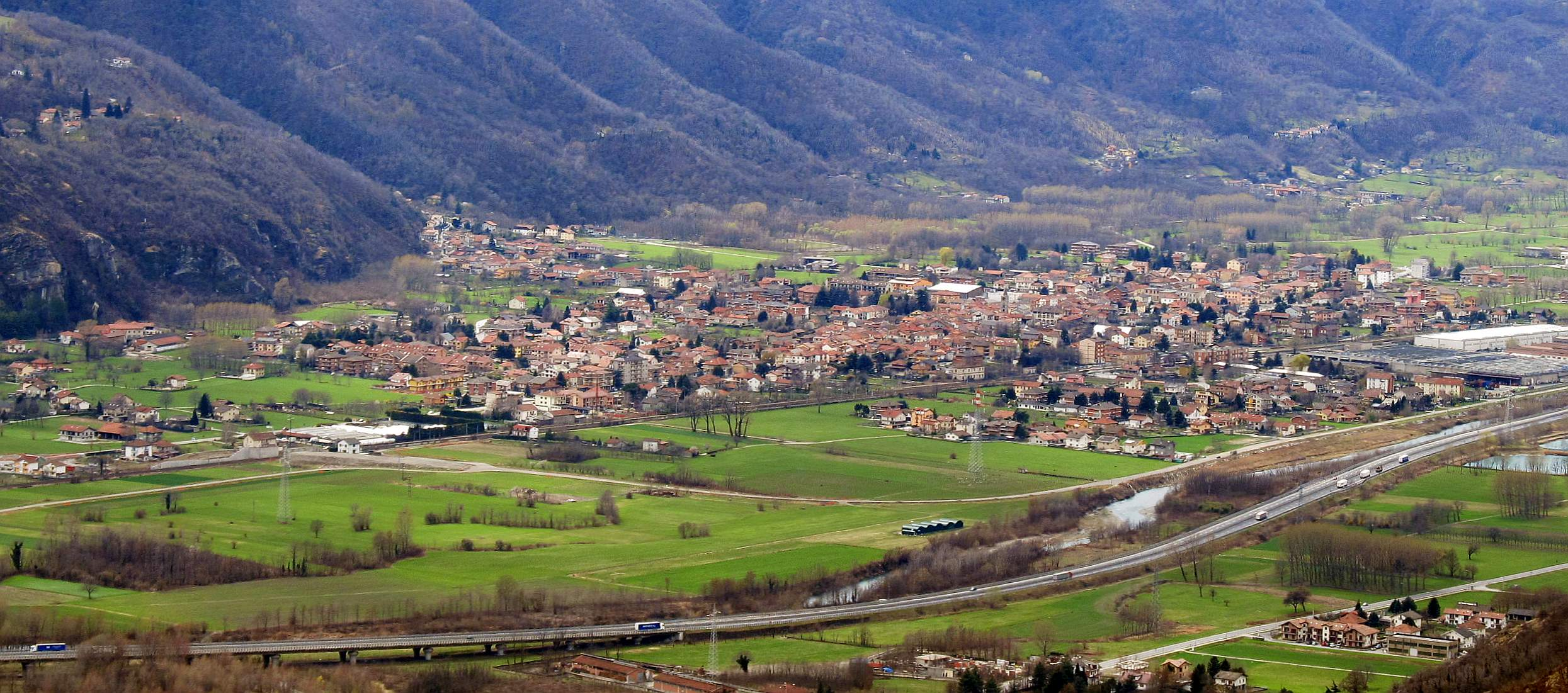
- Panorama from Truc del Serro

- Location within Italy Location within Piedmont
- Coordinates: 45°6′N 7°17′E
- Country: Italy
- Region: Piedmont
- Metropolitan city: Turin (TO)
- Frazioni: Cresto, Mareschi, Vignassa

Government
  - Mayor: Susanna Preacco

Area
  - Total: 10.0 km^{2} (3.9 sq mi)
- Elevation: 380 m (1,250 ft)

Population (30 September 2011)
  - Total: 4,391
  - Density: 439/km^{2} (1,140/sq mi)
- Demonym: Santantoninesi
- Time zone: UTC+1 (CET)
  - Summer (DST): UTC+2 (CEST)
- Postal code: 10050
- Dialing code: 011
- Website: Official website

Sant'Antonino di Susa (Piedmontese: San-Tunin, Arpitan: Santantunin) is a comune (municipality) in the Metropolitan City of Turin in the Italian region Piedmont, located in the Val di Susa about 35 kilometres (22 mi) west of Turin.
