= San Didero =

San Didero San Didé (Piedmontese) Sen Didé (Arpitan) Saint-Didier (French)
- Comune
- Comune di San Didero
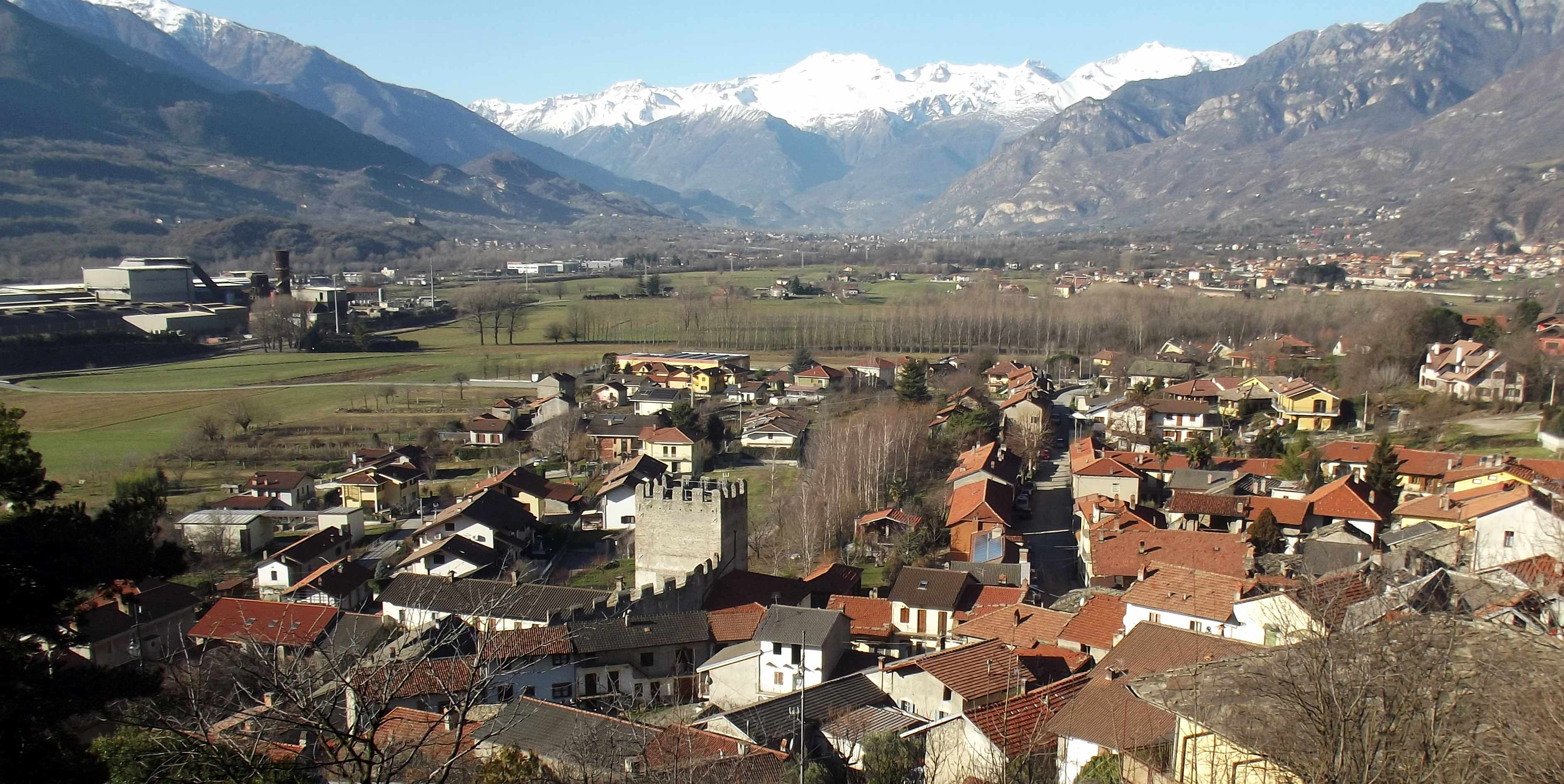

- Location within Italy Location within Piedmont
- Coordinates: 45°8′N 7°13′E
- Country: Italy
- Region: Piedmont
- Metropolitan city: Turin (TO)
- Frazioni: Volpi, Leitera

Government
  - Mayor: Sergio Lampo

Area
  - Total: 3.3 km^{2} (1.3 sq mi)
- Elevation: 430 m (1,410 ft)

Population (31 July 2018)
  - Total: 532
  - Density: 160/km^{2} (420/sq mi)
- Demonym: Sandideresi
- Time zone: UTC+1 (CET)
  - Summer (DST): UTC+2 (CEST)
- Postal code: 10050
- Dialing code: 011
- Patron saint: Desiderius of Langres
- Saint day: May 23
- Website: Official website

San Didero (Piedmontese: San Didé, Arpitan: Sen Didé, French: Saint-Didier) is a comune (municipality) in the Metropolitan City of Turin in the Italian region Piedmont, located about 40 km west of Turin in the Val di Susa.
