= Valgioie =

Valgioie Valgiòje (Piedmontese) Voudjiň (Arpitan)
- Comune
- Comune di Valgioie
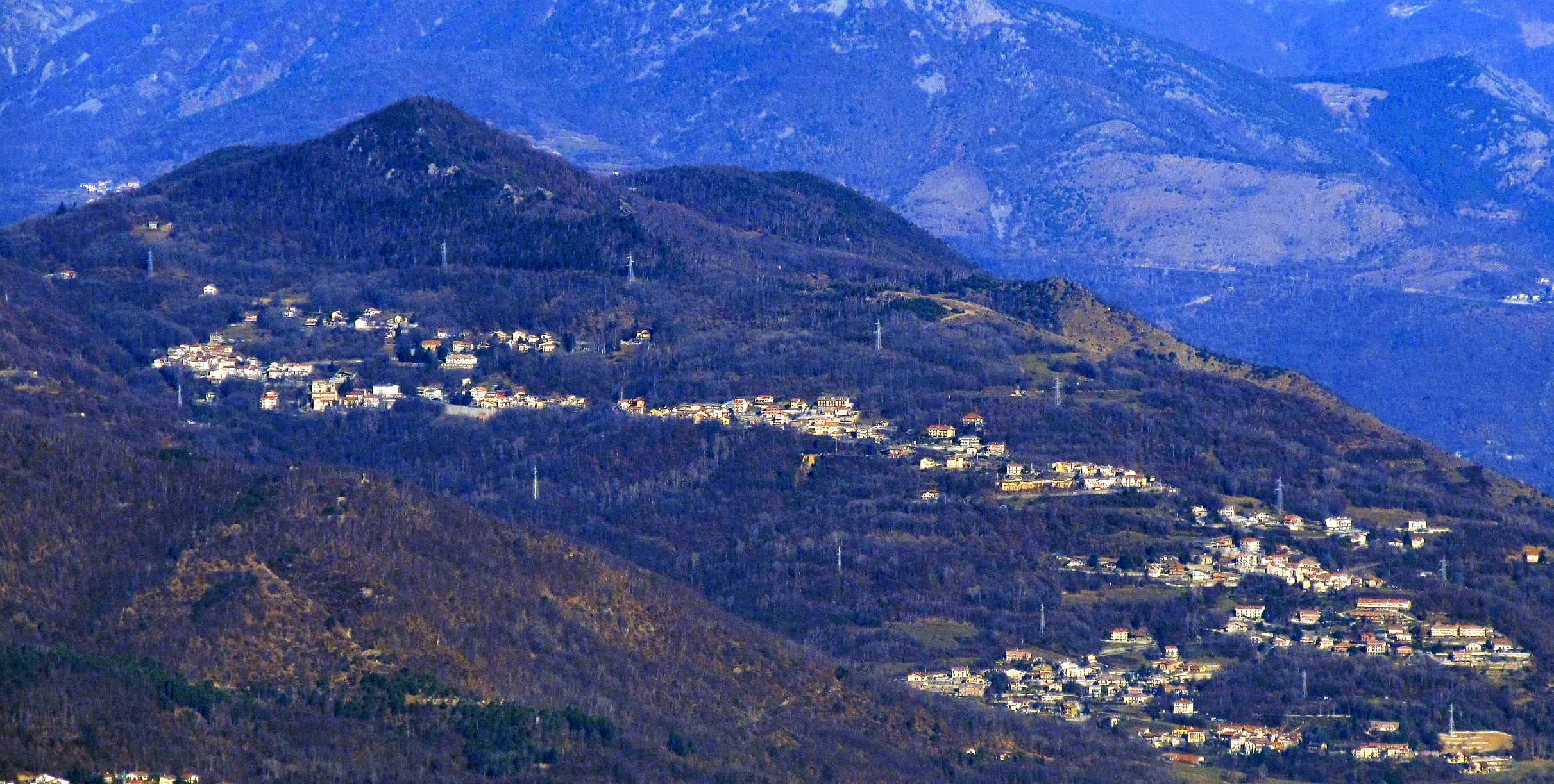

- Coat of arms

- Location within Italy Location within Piedmont
- Coordinates: 45°5′N 7°20′E
- Country: Italy
- Region: Piedmont
- Metropolitan city: Turin (TO)

Government
  - Mayor: Francesco Garsia

Area
  - Total: 9.1 km^{2} (3.5 sq mi)
- Elevation: 870 m (2,850 ft)

Population (31 December 2010)
  - Total: 952
  - Density: 100/km^{2} (270/sq mi)
- Demonym: Valgioiesi
- Time zone: UTC+1 (CET)
  - Summer (DST): UTC+2 (CEST)
- Postal code: 10094
- Dialing code: 011
- Patron saint: St. Pius

Valgioie (Piedmontese: Valgiòje, Arpitan: Voudjiň) is a comune (municipality) in the Metropolitan City of Turin in the Italian region Piedmont, located in the Val Sangone, about 30 km west of Turin.
