= Coazze =

Coazze Coasse (Piedmontese) Couvase (Arpitan) Couase (French)
- Comune
- Comune di Coazze
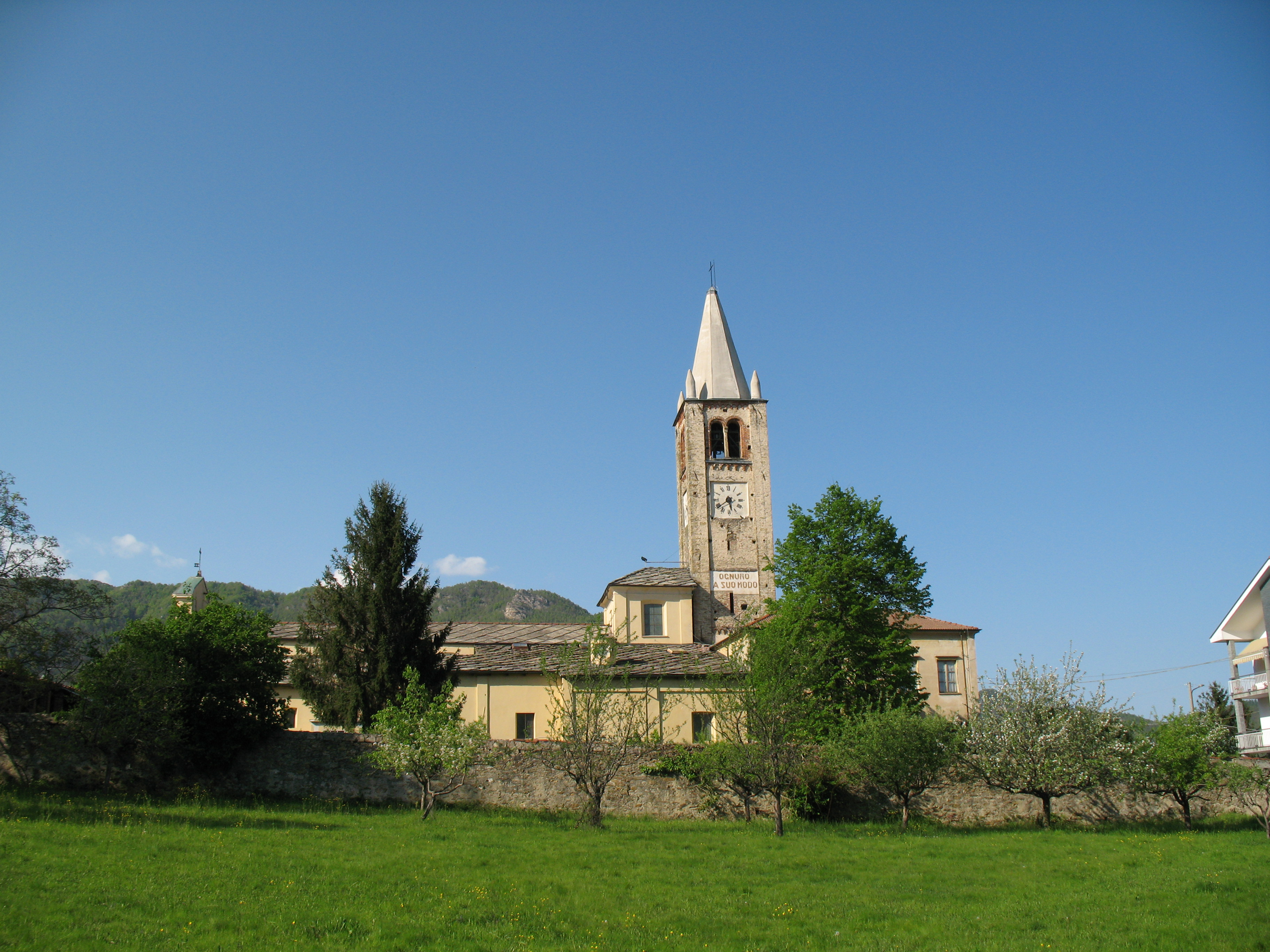
- Church of Santa Maria del Pino.

- Coat of arms

- Location within Italy Location within Piedmont
- Coordinates: 45°3′N 7°18′E
- Country: Italy
- Region: Piedmont
- Metropolitan city: Turin (TO)

Government
  - Mayor: Mario Ronco

Area
  - Total: 56.5 km^{2} (21.8 sq mi)

Population (31 December 2010)
  - Total: 3,339
  - Density: 59.1/km^{2} (153/sq mi)
- Demonym: Coazzesi
- Time zone: UTC+1 (CET)
  - Summer (DST): UTC+2 (CEST)
- Postal code: 10050
- Dialing code: 011
- Patron saint: Santa Maria Assunta in Cielo
- Saint day: 15 August
- Website: Official website

Coazze (Piedmontese: Coasse, Arpitan: Couvase, French: Couasse) is a comune (municipality) in the Metropolitan City of Turin in the Italian region Piedmont, located about 30 kilometres (19 mi) west of Turin.

== Twin towns ==
- Decazeville, France
