= Uja di Calcante =

Mountain in the Graian Alps, Piedmont, Italy

- Monte Calcante
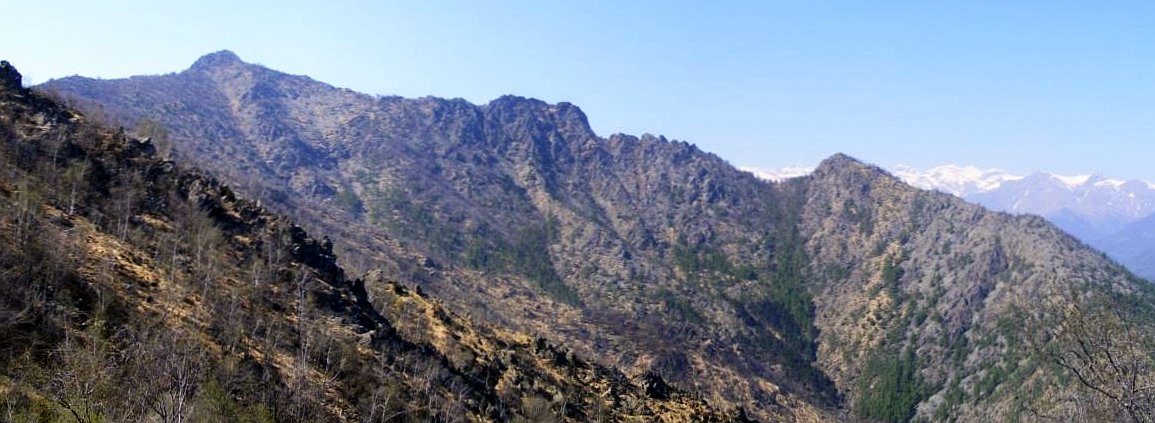
- The mountain seen from the nearby Monte Bellacomba

Highest point
- Prominence: 311 m (1,020 ft)
- Isolation: 2.52 km (1.57 mi)
- Coordinates: 45.259167°N 7.3875°E

Geography
- Region: Piedmont
- Parent range: Graian Alps

The Uja di Calcante (or Uia di Calcante, sometimes Monte Calcante) is a mountain in the Graian Alps with an elevation of 1,614 m (5,295 ft) above sea level. It is located in Piedmont on the watershed ridge between the Val d'Ala and the Valle di Viù, and its summit marks the convergence of the municipal territories of Traves, Mezzenile, and Viù, all in the Metropolitan City of Turin.

== Toponym ==
The term Uja, sometimes rendered as Uia, means needle or sharp point in the dialect of the Lanzo Valleys.

== Description ==
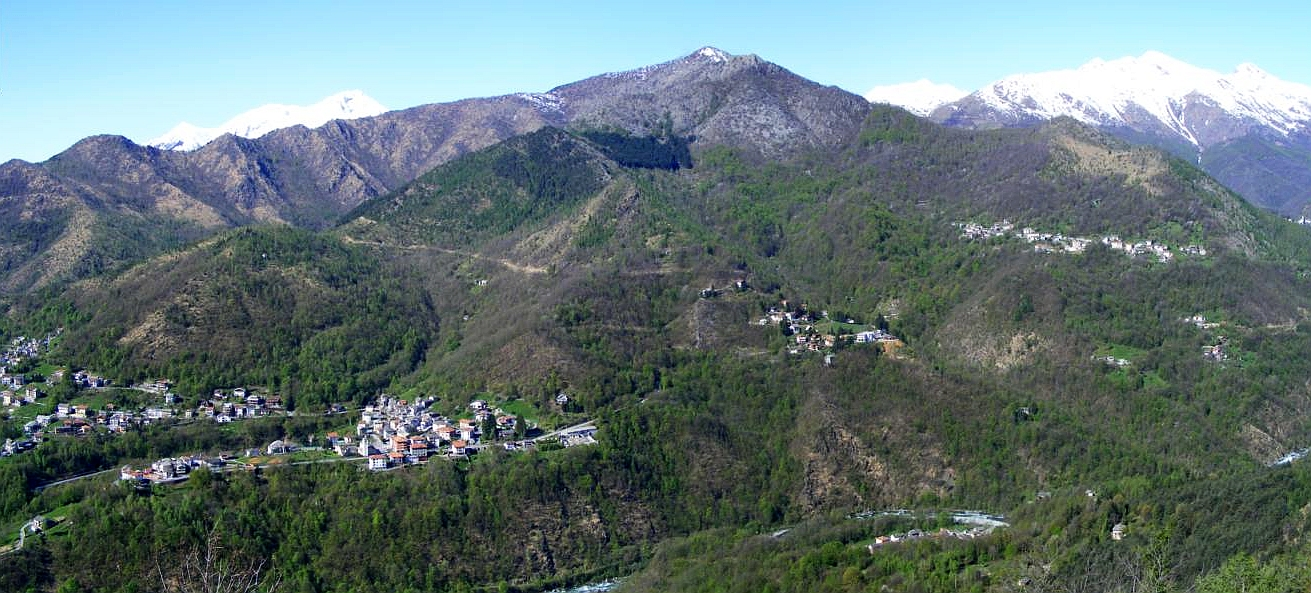
The northern slope seen from the Sant'Ignazio sanctuary

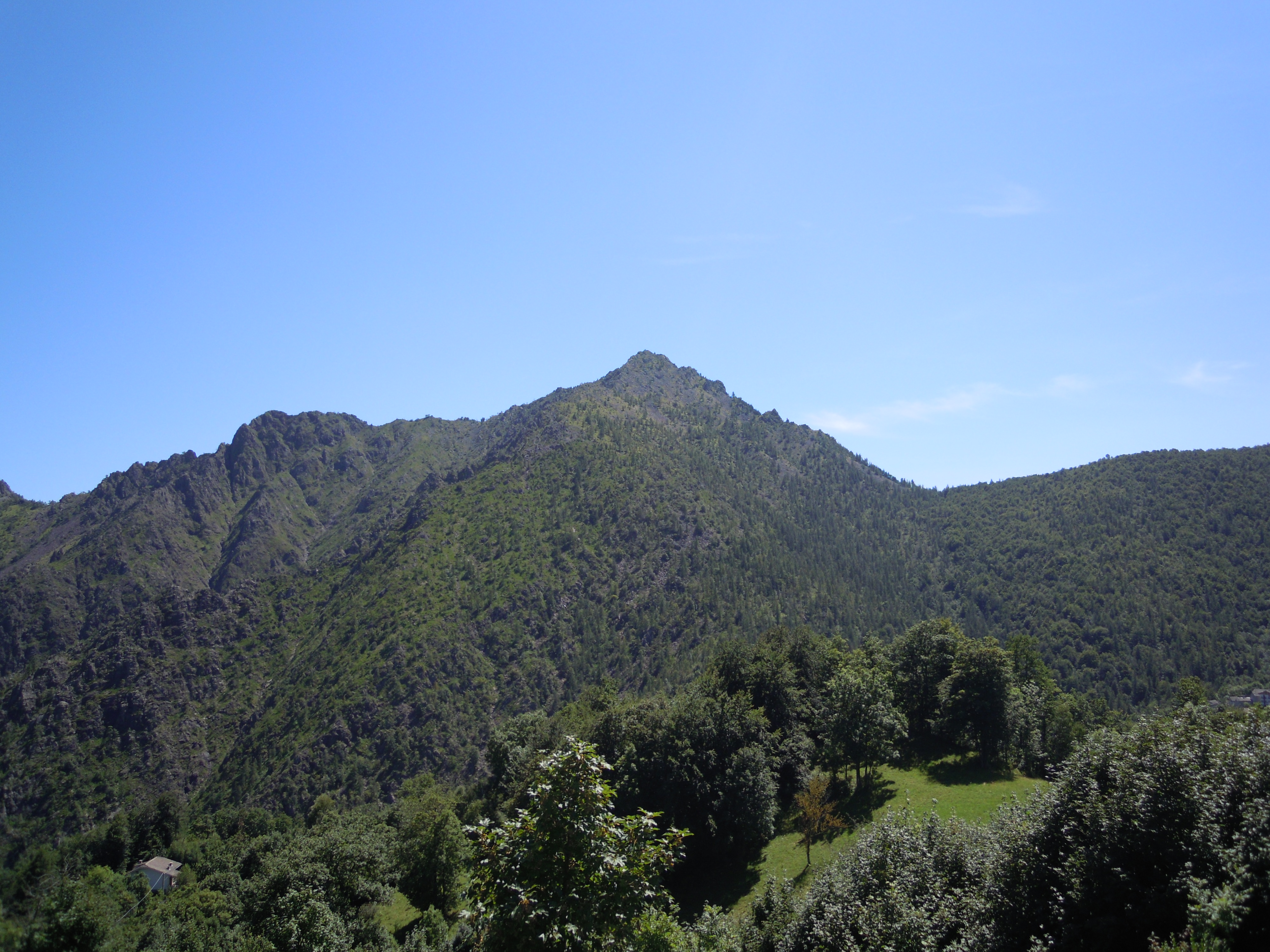
As seen from the Monti hamlet of Mezzenile

The mountain lies at the convergence of four ridges. The western ridge connects it to the Colle della Cialmetta (1,305 m (4,281 ft)) and forms part of the watershed separating the main Lanzo Valley from the Valle di Viù. The southeastern ridge also lies on this watershed, descending to the Colle Prà Lorenzo (1,384 m (4,541 ft)) and a saddle at 1,169 m (3,835 ft), then rising to form the Monte Bellacomba (1,199 m (3,934 ft)) and fading beyond the Punta d'Aprile (1,092 m). A third, short ridge points north and ends near Pessinetto, while the fourth, the most notable for mountaineering, reaches the Colle Lunelle (1,330 m), continuing westward without further mountaineering interest to the Cima Lunelle (1,384 m) and the Cima del Toro (1,108 m).

At the summit of the Uja di Calcante, where a cross stands, there is also a geodetic trigonometric point of the IGM named Monte di Calcante (055022).

From the summit, there is a view of the 3,000-meter peaks at the head of the Lanzo Valleys.

== Access to the summit ==
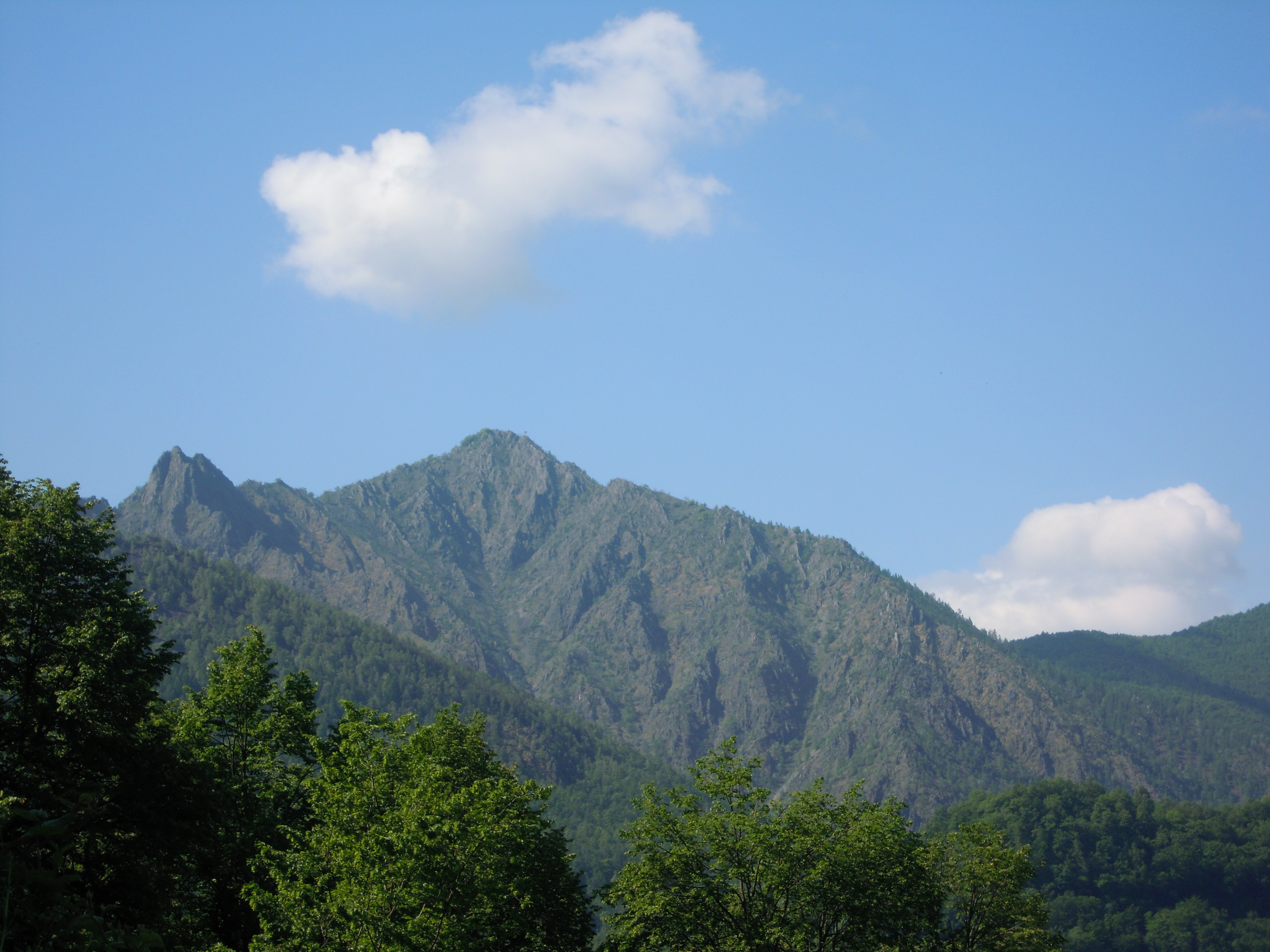
Uja di Calcante from the heights of Pessinetto

The commonly followed hiking routes to the summit pass through the Colle della Cialmetta or Prà Lorenzo, starting from Fubina or Selvagnengo (both hamlets of Viù) or from Mezzenile.

The mountain can also be reached from Traves by following the Sentiero Frassati, inaugurated in June 1997 and dedicated to the memory of the Blessed Piedmontese.

== History ==
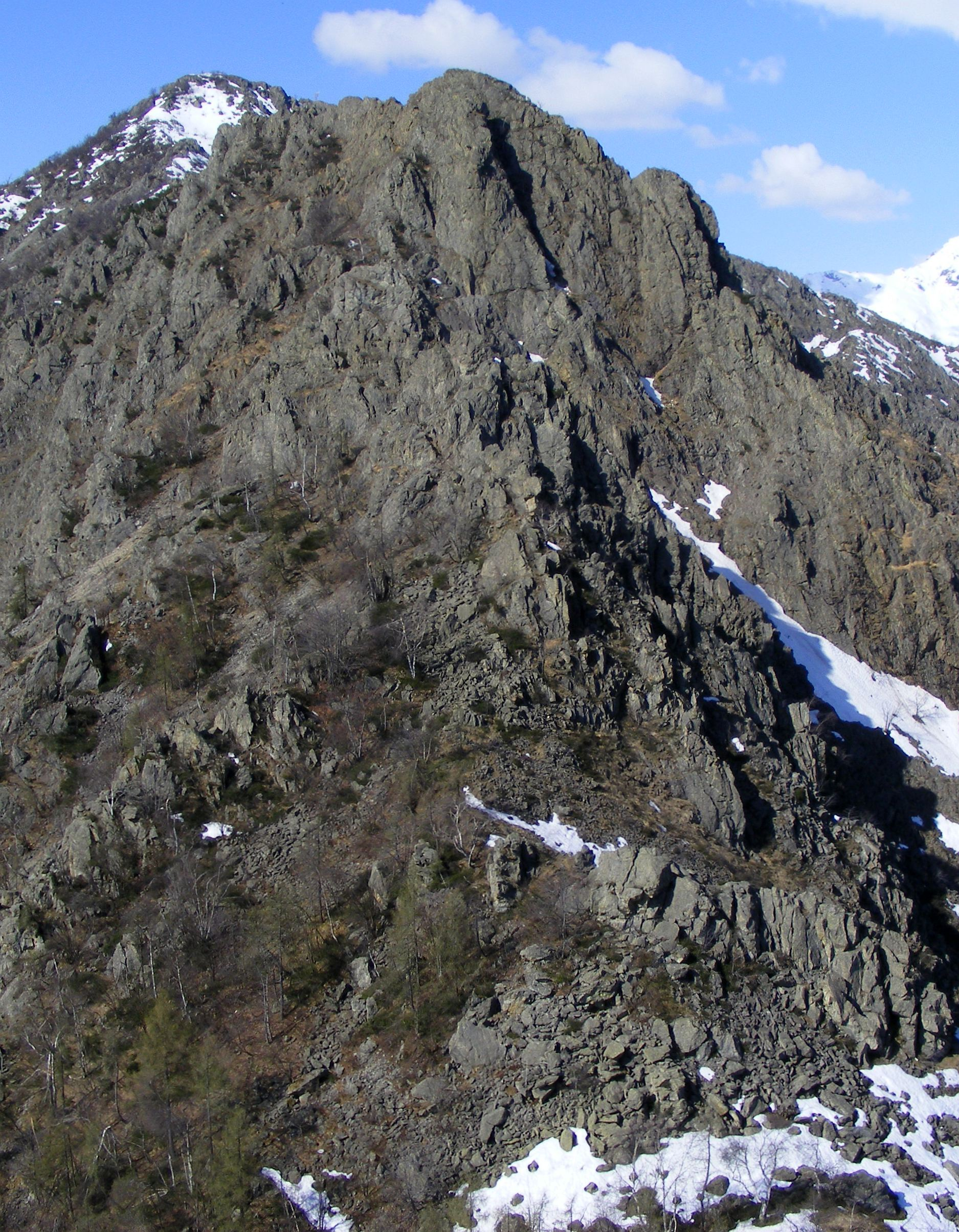
The Lunelle ridge seen from Cima Lunelle, with Uja di Calcante in the background

The ridge section between the mountain and the nearby Punta Lunelle (1,384 m) has historically served as a climbing training ground for Turin mountaineers. The rock is solid and rich in holds, and the route closely following the ridge crest has difficulties of grades II and III. The first recorded ascent in the CAI documentation dates to 1905; the area was heavily frequented until the 1960s and saw the deaths of some notable climbers of the time, including Alfredo Morello and Augusto Domask. Among the enthusiasts who frequented the area was Pier Giorgio Frassati, to whom a trail was dedicated in 1997.

== Flora ==
On the slopes of the mountain is one of the few known stations of Euphorbia gibelliana, an endemic plant exclusive to the Graian Alps.

== Mining exploitation ==
The slopes of the mountain were historically exploited for the extraction of iron minerals. In particular, on the northern slope facing Pessinetto and the eastern slope descending toward Traves, magnetite and chalcopyrite were extracted, providing raw materials for various small forges located near the Stura. The need for timber for these operations was met through deforestation of the Uja di Calcante and surrounding heights. Evidence of these mining activities, which ceased toward the end of the 19th century, includes some shafts and a service mule track for the mines.

== Cartography ==
- Official Italian cartography of the Istituto Geografico Militare (IGM) at scales 1:25,000 and 1:100,000, available online
- Istituto Geografico Centrale - Trail and refuge map scale 1:50,000 no. 2 Valli di Lanzo e Moncenisio
- Istituto Geografico Centrale - Trail and refuge map scale 1:25,000 no. 110 Basse Valli di Lanzo (Lanzo - Viù - Chialamberto - Locana - Ciriè)
