= Mount Château Blanc =

Mountain in Italy

- Location within Alps

Highest point
- Elevation: 3,408 m (11,181 ft)
- Coordinates: 45°38′24″N 7°01′27″E

Geography
- Location: Aosta Valley, Italy

Mount Château Blanc (Italian: Monte Château Blanc, French: Mont Château Blanc) is a 3,408 m (11,181 ft) tall mountain of the Graian Alps in northern Italy. Its summit lies on the boundary between the municipalities of La Thuile, Valgrisenche and Arvier in the Aosta Valley, Italy.

== Description ==
Mount Château Blanc stands along the ridge dividing the Rutor Valley in the west from the Valgrisenche to the east and which culminates at Testa del Rutor (3,486 m, 11,437 ft) to the south-west of the summit.

The mountain's eastern slopes, on the Valgrisenche side, are occupied by the Château Blanc Glacier, whereas the larger Rutor Glacier extends across its western flank in the Rutor Valley.

== SOIUSA classification ==
According to the SOIUSA (International Standardized Mountain Subdivision of the Alps) the mountain can be classified in the following way:

- main part = Western Alps
- major sector = North Western Alps
- section = Graian Alps
- subsection = Alpi della Grande Sassière e del Rutor
- supergroup = Catena Rutor-Léchaud
- group = Gruppo del Rutor
- subgroup = Nodo del Rutor

== Ascent ==
The summit is most commonly reached from Planaval at the entrance to the Valgrisenche. The ascent is a popular ski mountaineering route.
