= Rutor Glacier =

Glacier in Aosta Valley, Italy

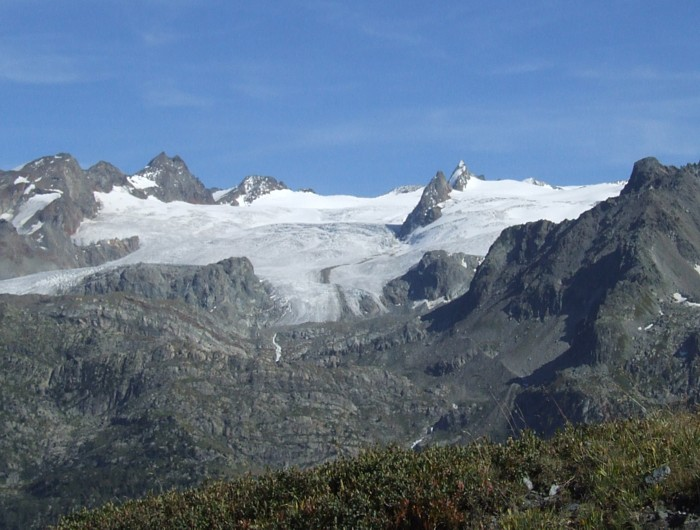
- The Rutor Glacier in 2006
- Interactive map of Rutor Glacier
- Coordinates: 45°38′50″N 7°00′41″E
- Area: 7.5 km^{2} (2.9 sq mi)
- Length: 4 km (2.5 mi)

The Rutor Glacier (Italian: Ghiacciaio del Rutor, French: Glacier du Rutor) is a glacier in the Graian Alps, in the Aosta Valley region of northern Italy. It is the third-largest glacier in Aosta Valley by surface area, after the Miage Glacier and the Lys Glacier.

== Description ==
The glacier extends across the head of the Rutor Valley, a branch of the La Thuile Valley, within the municipality of La Thuile. It takes its name from Testa del Rutor (3,486 m, 11,437 ft), the highest peak overlooking it. The glacier is surrounded by several other summits of the Graian Alps, including Mount Flambeau (3,315 m, 10,876 ft), Mount Doravidi (3,439 m, 11,283 ft), Mount Château Blanc (3,408 m, 11,181 ft), Becca du Lac (3,402 m, 11,161 ft), and Grand Assaly (3,177 m, 10,423 ft). Rising at the center of the glacier are the Vedette du Rutor (3,332 m, 10,932 ft) and Pointe d'Invernet (3,307 m, 10,850 ft).

It is a mountain glacier with a sloping profile and a north-northwest exposure. Its highest elevation is approximately 3,340 m (10,960 ft), while its lowest point lies around 2,640 m (8,660 ft). The glacier reaches a maximum length of about 4 km (2.5 mi). As of 2022, its surface area was estimated at 7.5 km^{2} (2.9 sq mi).

At the foot of the glacier, within a basin carved by glacial erosion, lies a chain of glacial lakes and ponds, including Upper Rutor Lake, Lower Rutor Lake, Lake Vert, Lake Gris, and Lake Séracs. The nearby Refuge Deffeyes serves as a key base for excursions to the glacier. Meltwater from the glacier feeds the Dora del Rutor, which flows downstream to form the Rutor Falls before joining the Dora di Verney (French: Doire de Verney), itself a tributary of the Dora Baltea river.

The glacier has undergone significant retreat since the second half of the 19th century. Measurements indicate a loss of roughly 4 km^{2} (1.5 sq mi) of surface area between 1865 and 2023, including about 1.5 km^{2} (0.58 sq mi) in the fifty years preceding the survey. From the early 1970s to 2023, the front of the glacier's right lobe retreated by approximately 650 m (2,130 ft), while the left lobe receded by about 750 m (2,460 ft).

== History ==
From the Middle Ages until the mid-19th century, the Rutor Glacier was notorious for the sudden outburst floods of Lake Santa Margherita. The lake had formed behind an ice dam created by the glacier's tongue and occupied the basin where Refuge Deffeyes now stands. When the ice dam failed, vast volumes of water surged into the Dora di La Thuile (French: Doire de La Thuile), triggering floods that could be catastrophic and, in some cases, travel downstream along the Dora Baltea almost as far as Aosta.

Historical records attribute dozens of these glacial lake outburst floods to the glacier between 1594 and 1864, including the particularly devastating floods of 1594 and 1595.
