= Albaron =

Mountain in Italy

- Albaron di Savoia
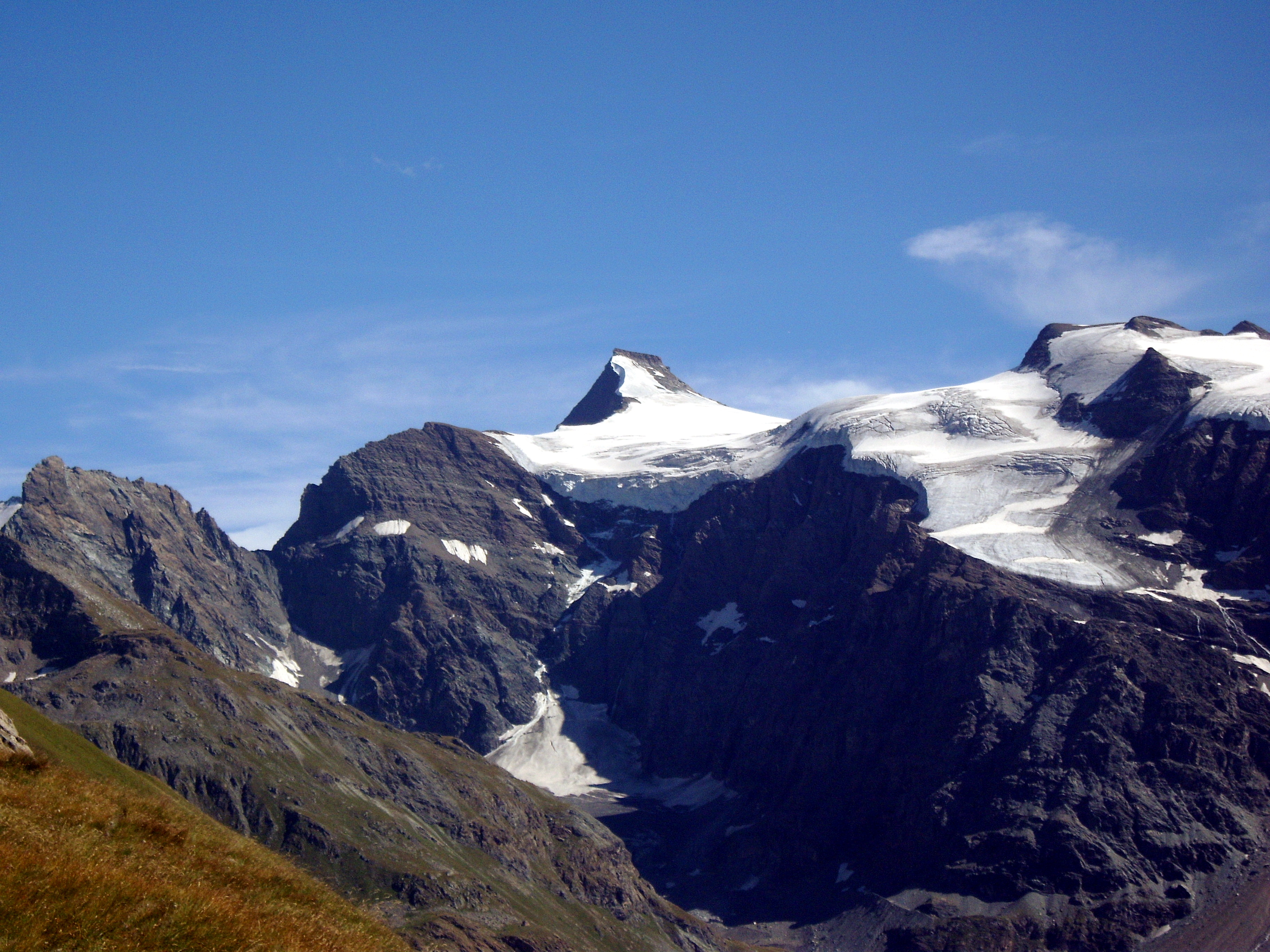
- Albaron (centre)

Highest point
- Elevation: 3,638 m (11,936 ft)
- Prominence: 327 m (1,073 ft)
- Listing: Alpine mountains above 3000 m
- Coordinates: 45°20′02″N 7°06′04″E

Geography
- Location within Alps
- Location: Savoie, France
- Parent range: Graian Alps

Climbing
- First ascent: 1866

Albaron (3,638 m) is a mountain of the Graian Alps in Savoie, France. Along with the nearby mountain Uia di Ciamarella it forms a large glacial basin. It was first climbed in 1866 by Yeamin and Shahd.

== Hiking and skiing ==
It is a popular mountain to climb due to its relative ease and clear summit, which appears as a sharp pyramid, especially from the southeast or north. It is also a popular mountain with ski mountaineers.
