= Pointe de Ronce =

Mountain of Savoie, France

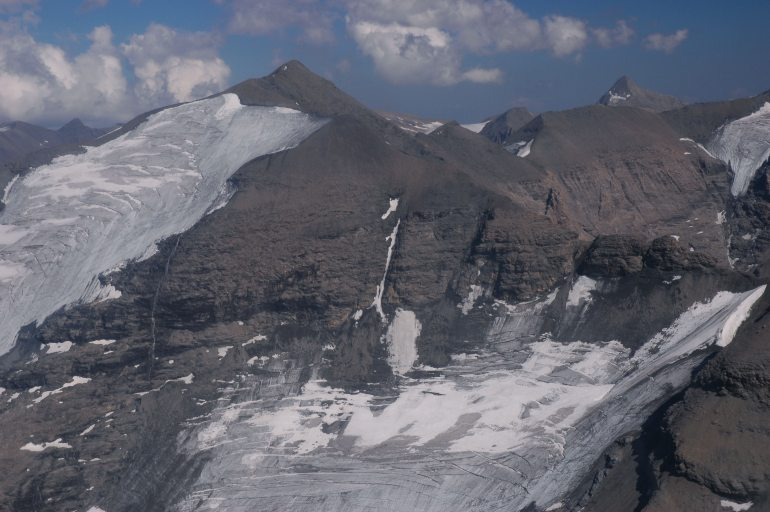

Highest point
- Elevation: 3,612 m (11,850 ft)
- Prominence: 466 m (1,529 ft)
- Listing: Alpine mountains above 3000 m
- Coordinates: 45°15′53″N 06°58′42″E

Geography
- Location within France
- Location: Savoie, France
- Parent range: Graian Alps

Pointe de Ronce is a mountain of Savoie, France in the Mont Cenis range. It has an elevation of 3,612 metres (11,850 ft) above sea level.

== Geography ==
Pointe de Ronce is located near the Mont Cenis Pass and overlooks the village of Lanslebourg in Haute-Maurienne. A wide circus, called 'Plan des Cavales', opens on the west side towards the Lac du Mont-Cenis.

From the summit, a long ridge stretches south-east to Pointe du Lamet (3,504 m), Roche Michel (2,885 m) and to Rocciamelone.

In the mountain slopes exposed to the north, recline two glaciers, namely glacier de l'Arcelle Neuve and glacier du Vieux.

Given the height of the mountain and the special isolation of its summit, one gets a wide view of the surrounding mountains.

== Climb to the summit ==
The access to the summit generally begins from Lake of Mont-Cenis. Arrived in Plan des Fontainettes (2,090 m) starting at the characteristic pyramid-shaped church, walk to Fort de Ronce. Near the Fort, start heading north on a long path that goes with large coils to reach Col du Lou (3,042 m). From the pass, follow the ridge eastwards overcoming various ridges, the largest of which is Signal du Grand Mont-Cenis (3,377 m), and finally to the summit ridge.

Downhill you can retrace the ascent route or you can go down the southeastern slope of the mountain, through the Pointe du Lamet, and then go down to the Lake of Mont-Cenis.

== Maps ==
- French official cartography (Institut géographique national - IGN); on-line version: www.geoportail.fr
- Istituto Geografico Centrale - Carta dei sentieri e dei rifugi 1:50.000 nr 2 Valli di Lanzo e Moncenisio
