= Pessinetto =

Pessinetto Psinèj/Psinaj (Piedmontese) Pisinài (Arpitan)
- Comune
- Comune di Pessinetto
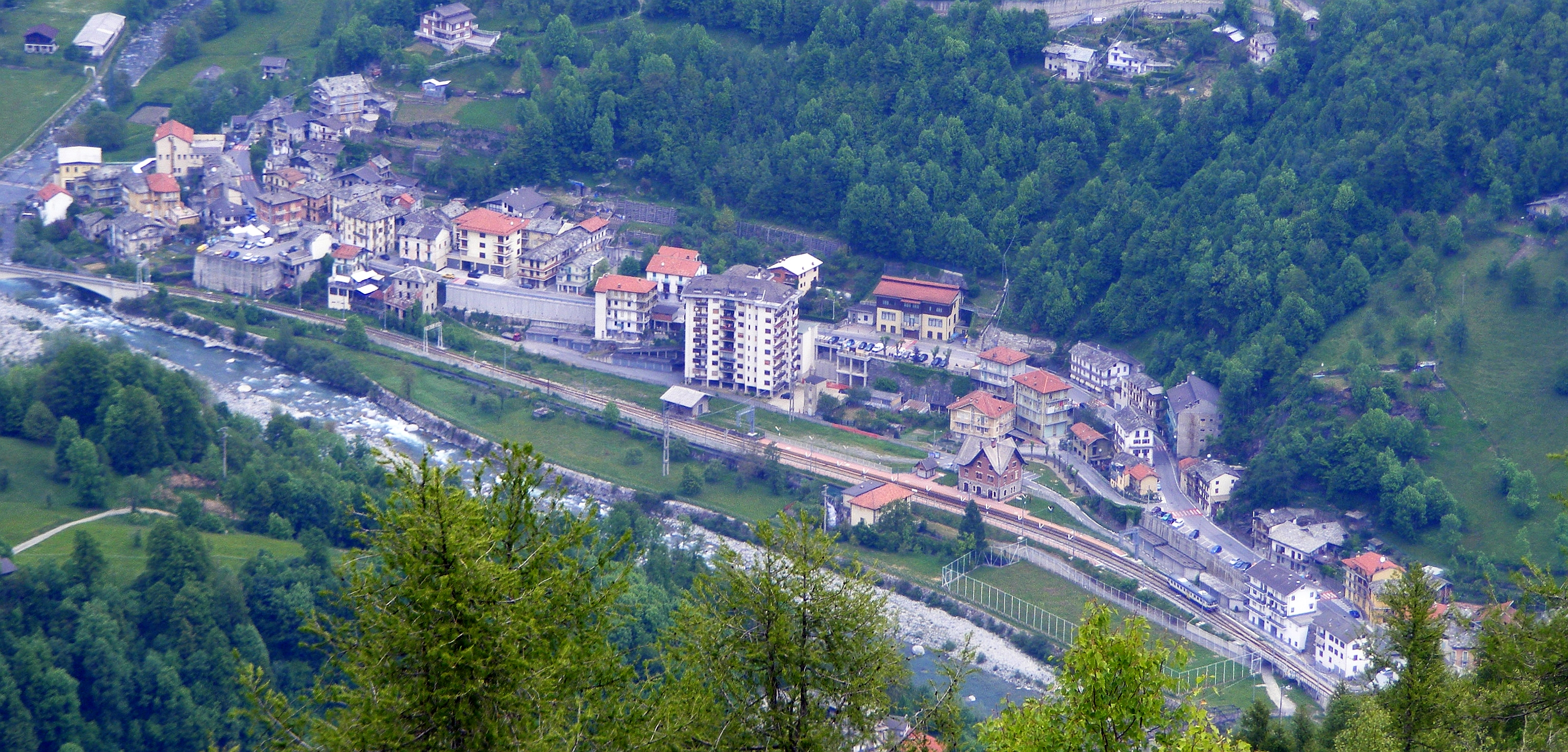
- Panorama from Monte Crestà

- Location within Italy Location within Piedmont
- Coordinates: 45°17′N 7°24′E
- Country: Italy
- Region: Piedmont
- Metropolitan city: Turin (TO)
- Frazioni: Gisola, Losa, Mombresto, Pessinetto Fuori, Sant'Ignazio, Tortore

Government
  - Mayor: Gianluca Togliatti

Area
  - Total: 5.4 km^{2} (2.1 sq mi)
- Elevation: 590 m (1,940 ft)

Population (31 December 2014)
  - Total: 608
  - Density: 110/km^{2} (290/sq mi)
- Demonym: Pessinettesi
- Time zone: UTC+1 (CET)
  - Summer (DST): UTC+2 (CEST)
- Postal code: 10070
- Dialing code: 0123
- Website: [http:// Official website]

Pessinetto (Piedmontese: Psinèj or Psinaj, Arpitan: Pisinài) is a comune (municipality) in the Metropolitan City of Turin in the Italian region Piedmont, located about 35 km northwest of Turin.

Pessinetto borders the following municipalities: Monastero di Lanzo, Ceres, Mezzenile, Lanzo Torinese, Traves, and Germagnano.
