= Traves =

Traves may refer to:

- Traves, Piedmont in Italy
- Traves, Haute-Saône in France
