= Roche Michel =

Mountain in France

- Location within France

Highest point
- Elevation: 3,406 m (11,175 ft)
- Listing: Alpine mountains above 3000 m
- Coordinates: 45°14′20″N 7°00′55″E

Geography
- Location: Savoie, France
- Parent range: Graian Alps

Roche Michel is a mountain peak in the Graian Alps in France. It is located in Savoie, the northeastern part of the country, very close to the Italian border and 500 km southeast of Paris. Roche Michel has an elevation of 3,406 meters above sea level [Note 2] or 3,429m per OpenStreetMap data.

== Geography ==
Roche Michel is a mountain peak in the Graian Alps in Savoie, very close to the Italian border. The land around Roche Michel is mostly mountainous. [note 3] The highest point in the area is Pointe de Charbonnel, 3,752 meters above sea level, 5.8 km northeast of Roche Michel. [note 4] To the North is Pointe des Fallets (3,226m) and to the West Pointe du Lamet (3,504m) and to the Northwest Pointe de la Haie (3452m), which surround and enclose the Glacier de Roche Michel in a depression.

In the region around Roche Michel, mountains, and ice are very common. [note 5] while the surrounding area is almost covered in mixed forest.

The nearest larger town is Lanslebourg-Mont-Cenis, 12.0 km west of Roche Michel. Per NASA calculation, about 222 people per square kilometer live around Roche Michel, which would be relatively densely populated.

The climate is continental. The average temperature is 7 °C. The warmest month is July, at 18 °C, and the coldest is December, at −3 °C. The average rainfall is 1,287 millimeters per year. The wettest month is November, with 197 millimeters of rain, and the driest is September, with 64 millimeters.

== History ==
Roche Michel was first climbed by Horace Bénédict de Saussure in 1780.

In November 2010, 3 hikers were killed in an avalanche during their attempt to climb Roche Michel.

== Access ==
Access is either from the Southeast or via a very long itinerary from the Southwest. It requires good mountaineering skills, in an environment without trails.

For access via Mont Cenise from the SW the minimum time required is around 8 hours only to 3,253m, considerably longer to the peak of Roche Michel and various descent variants. The climb starts at Mont Cenise via Rifugio Stellina, passing the Baraccon de Chamois cottages (2655m). When the trail continues downhill, one crosses a stream. Just before the Lamet cottages, one starts to climb in Northeasterly direction over steep meadows to reach a ridge at 2,500m. The steep ridge leads into the upper part of Pian Ciardun, following the grassy slopes that then open into a field of debris and boulder towards the base of the wall of 3,253m. One climbs the ridge in Northwesterly direction to reach the highest peak marked with a stone cairn.

== Notes ==
1. Correct position based on height data (DEM 3") from Viewfinder Panoramas.
2. Calculated from height data (DEM 3") from Viewfinder Panoramas.
3. Calculated from the intersection of all height data (DEM 3") from Viewfinder Panoramas, within a 10 kilometer radius.
4. The point that is highest above the local horizon, according to the elevation data of GeoNames.
5. Less than 20 kilometers away compared to the average density of Earth, according to GeoNames.
