= Aiguille des Glaciers =

Mountain in the Mont Blanc massif

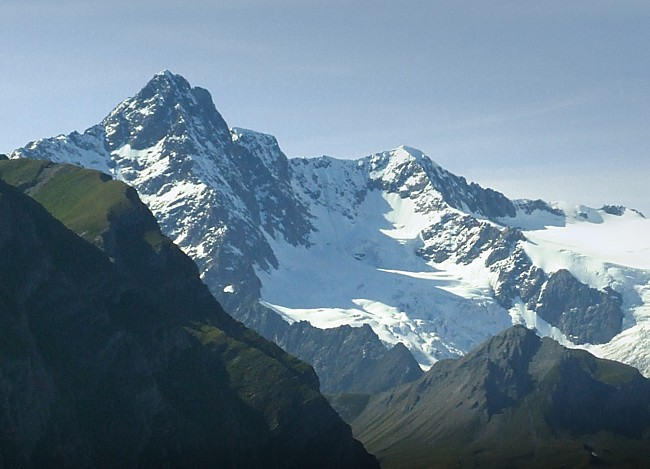

Highest point
- Elevation: 3,816 m (12,520 ft)
- Prominence: 299 m (981 ft)
- Listing: Alpine mountains above 3000 m
- Coordinates: 45°46′43″N 06°48′09″E

Geography
- Location within Alps
- Location: Savoie and Haute-Savoie, France; Aosta Valley, Italy
- Parent range: Mont Blanc Massif, Graian Alps

Climbing
- First ascent: 2 August 1878 by E. Del Carretto, Francesco Gonella, Laurent Proment, Ange Henry and Gratien Henry

The Aiguille des Glaciers (3,816 m) is a mountain in the Mont Blanc massif of the Graian Alps. It lies on the borders of Savoie and Haute-Savoie in France and Aosta Valley in Italy.

A fine pyramidal peak when seen to the south from the Italian side, Aiguille des Glaciers dominates the view from the upper Veny Valley, although it is less distinct from its French side. It is usually climbed from the Vallee des Glaciers in Savoie. The view from its summit is one of the best in the entire area.

On 1 November 1946, a B-17 Flying Fortress of the US Airforce crashed into the Aiguille des Glaciers, just 66 meters below the summit of Mont Blanc, killing all eight crew members. The crash site was not discovered until July 1947, when remains were found at an altitude of 3,700 metres (12,000 ft).

== See also ==
- List of mountains of the Alps
