= Punta Tersiva =

Mountain in Italy

Punta Tersiva Pointe Tersive
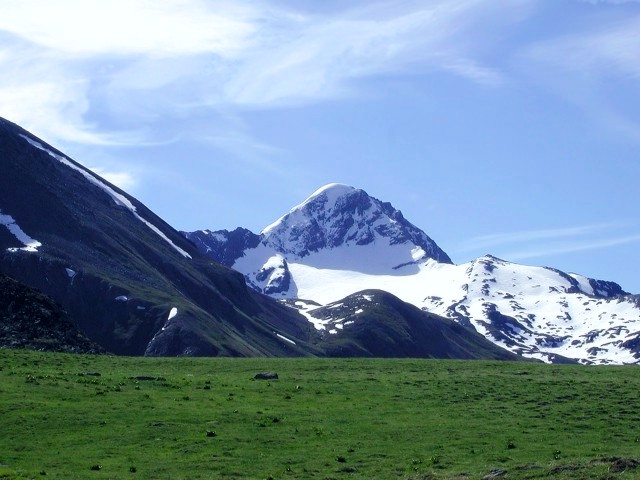
- Punta Tersiva

Highest point
- Elevation: 3,512 m (11,522 ft)
- Prominence: 600 m (2,000 ft)
- Isolation: 9.63 km (5.98 mi)
- Listing: Alpine mountains above 3000 m
- Coordinates: 45°37′18″N 7°28′31″E

Geography
- Location within Alps
- Location: Aosta Valley, Italy
- Parent range: Graian Alps

Climbing
- First ascent: 1842

Punta Tersiva (French: Pointe Tersive) (3,512m) is a mountain of the Graian Alps in Aosta Valley, north-western Italy. It is described as an "elegant, pyramid shaped mountain".

The mountain is a tough climb, and most of the famous peaks of the Alps are visible from its summit on a clear day, with Gran Paradiso especially visible.
