= Rutor Falls =

Coordinates: 45°40′32″N 6°57′54″E

- Cascate del Rutor (Italian); Cascades du Rutor (French)
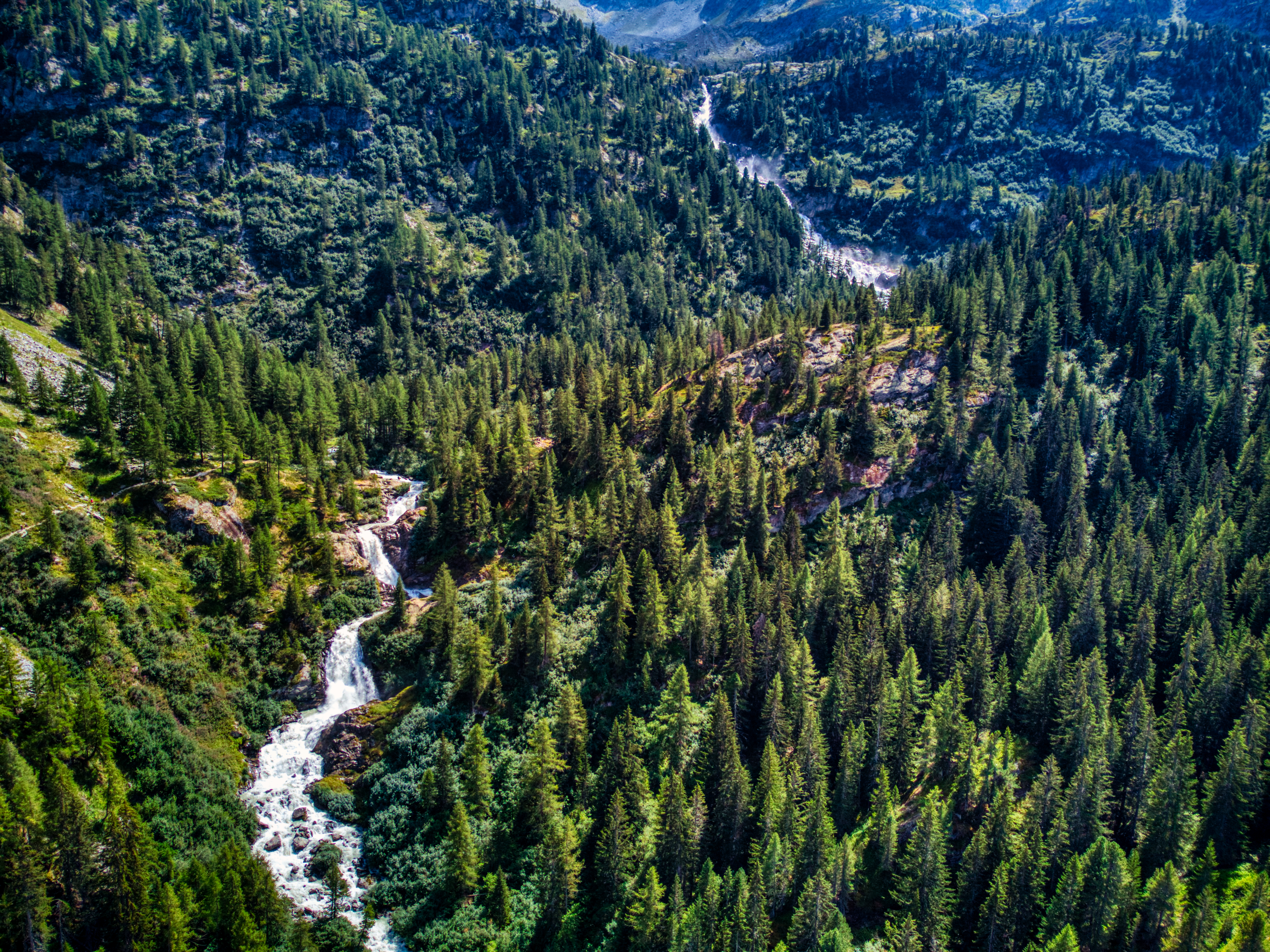
- Rutor Falls in 2023
- Interactive map of Rutor Falls
- Location: La Thuile, Italy
- Number of drops: 3

The Rutor Falls (Italian: Cascate del Rutor; French: Cascades du Rutor) are a series of three waterfalls along the Dora del Rutor (or French: Doire du Rutor) river near La Thuile in Aosta Valley, Italy.

== Geography ==
The waterfalls are fed by the Dora del Rutor river, whose waters originate largely from the alpine lakes in the upper valley. These lakes are supplied by meltwater from the Rutor Glacier and seasonal snowpack. As the river descends through the valley, it drops over a steep elevation gradient, forming three main waterfalls at approximately 2,030, 1,850, and 1,700 metres in elevation, respectively.

== History ==
The waterfalls gained prominence during the 19th century, thanks in part to Abbé Pierre Chanoux, who promoted the site and favoured the construction of a lookout bridge overlooking the third waterfall.

== Gallery ==
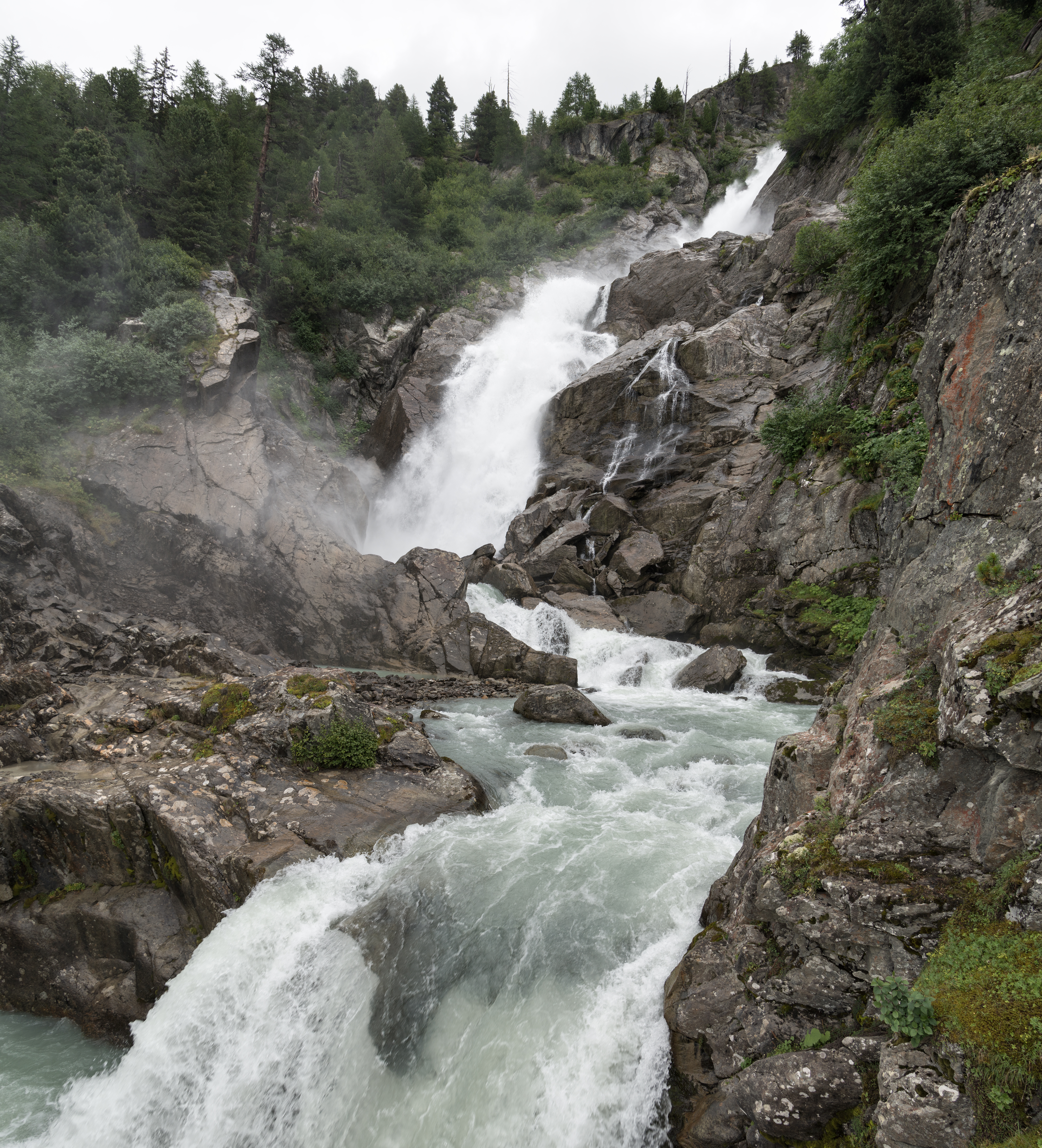

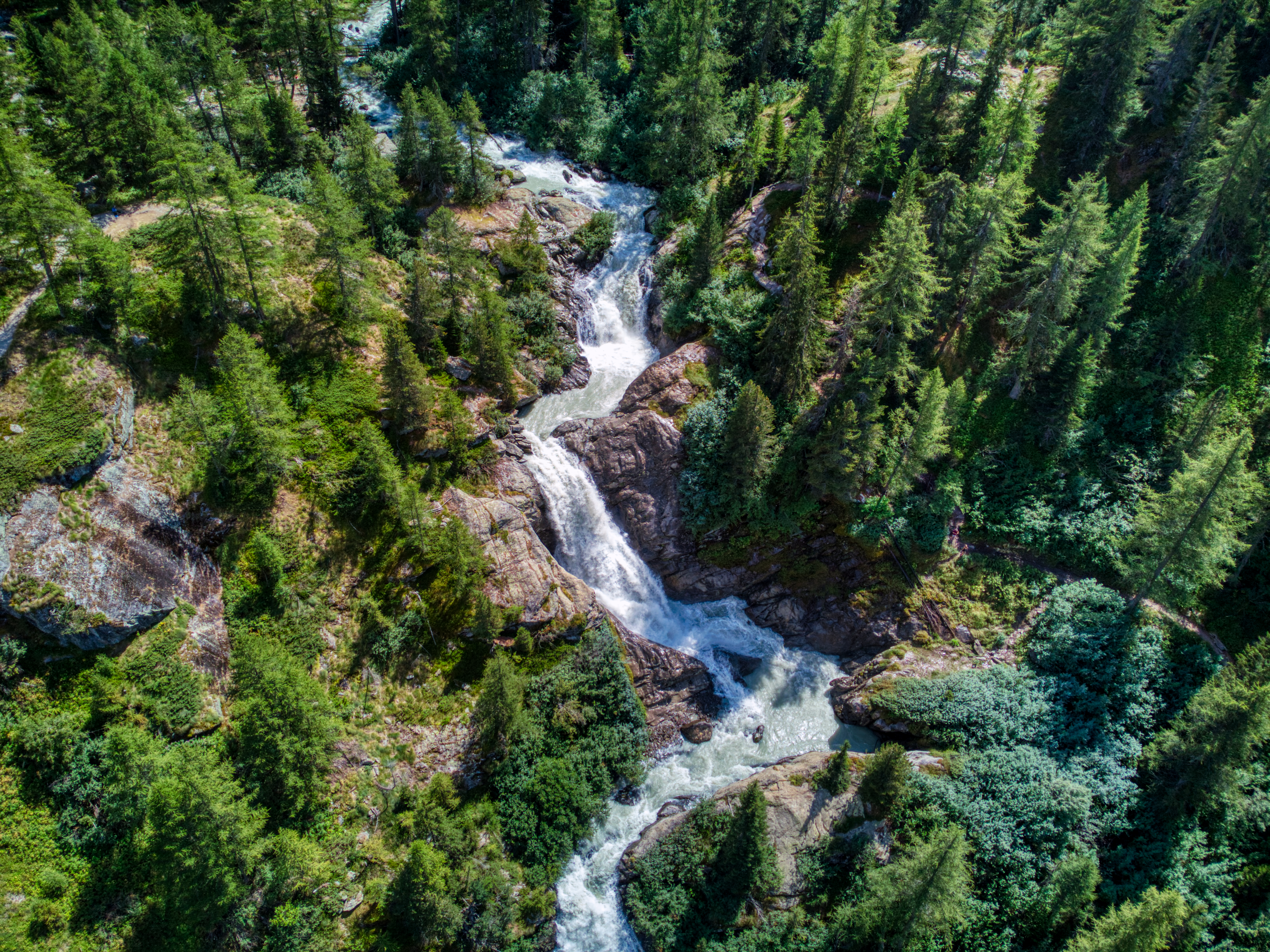
