= Tsanteleina =

Mountain in Italy

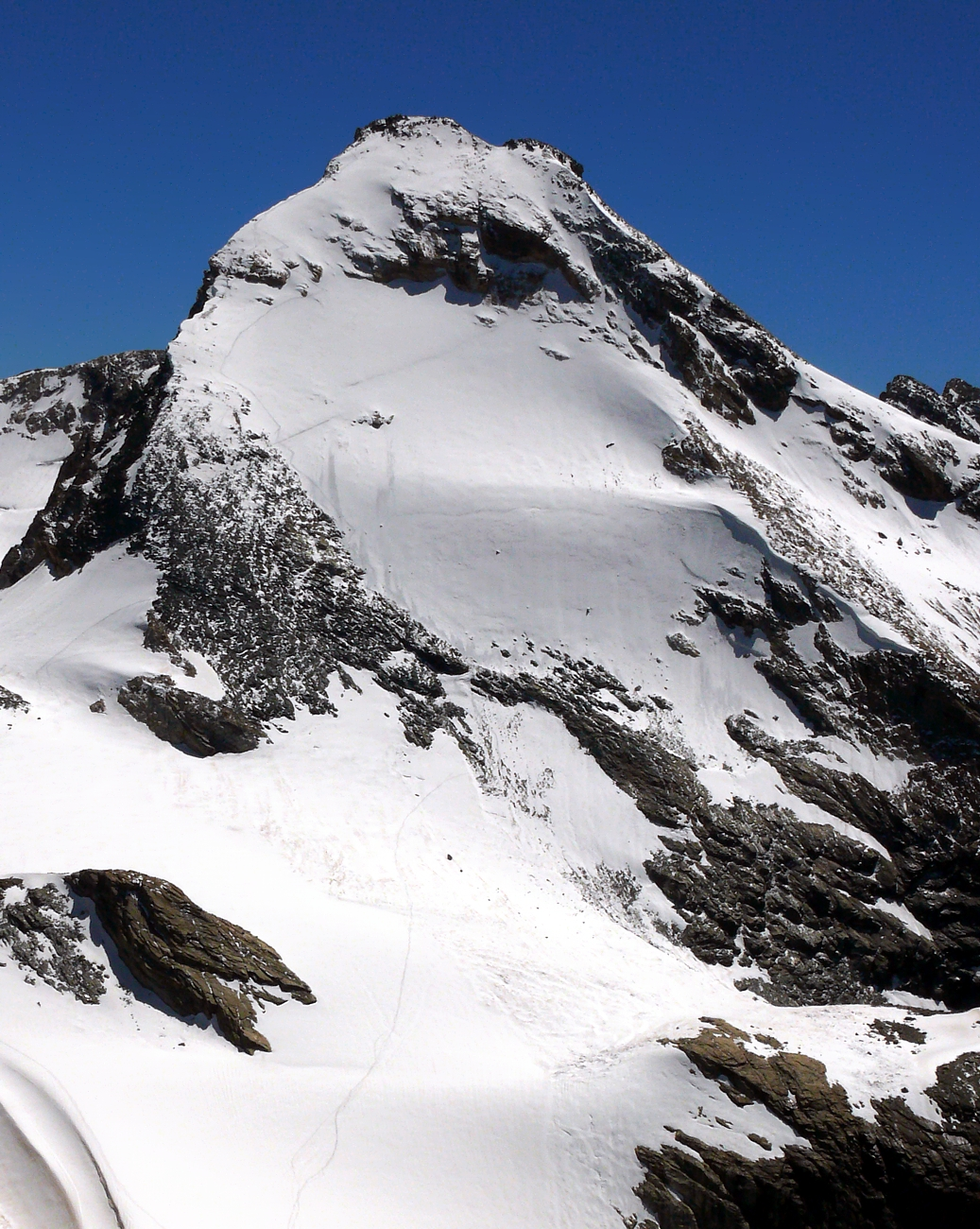
- Tsanteleina

Highest point
- Elevation: 3,601 m (11,814 ft)
- Prominence: 500 m (1,600 ft)
- Isolation: 4.58 km (2.85 mi)
- Listing: Alpine mountains above 3000 m
- Coordinates: 45°28′51″N 7°02′42″E

Geography
- Location within Alps
- Location: Aosta Valley, Italy and Rhône-Alpes, France
- Parent range: Graian Alps

Climbing
- First ascent: 1865

Tsanteleina (3,601m) is a mountain of the Graian Alps located on the border between Savoie, France and Aosta Valley, Italy. It lies at the head of the Rhêmes Valley, although the summit itself is hidden from view in the valley. The eastern side of the mountain lies within the Gran Paradiso National Park.

The normal route to the summit is from the north as the paths on the other side of the mountain have been neglected due to the poor quality of the rock. The north face is also popular with ski mountaineers.
