= Mont Pourri =

Mountain in France

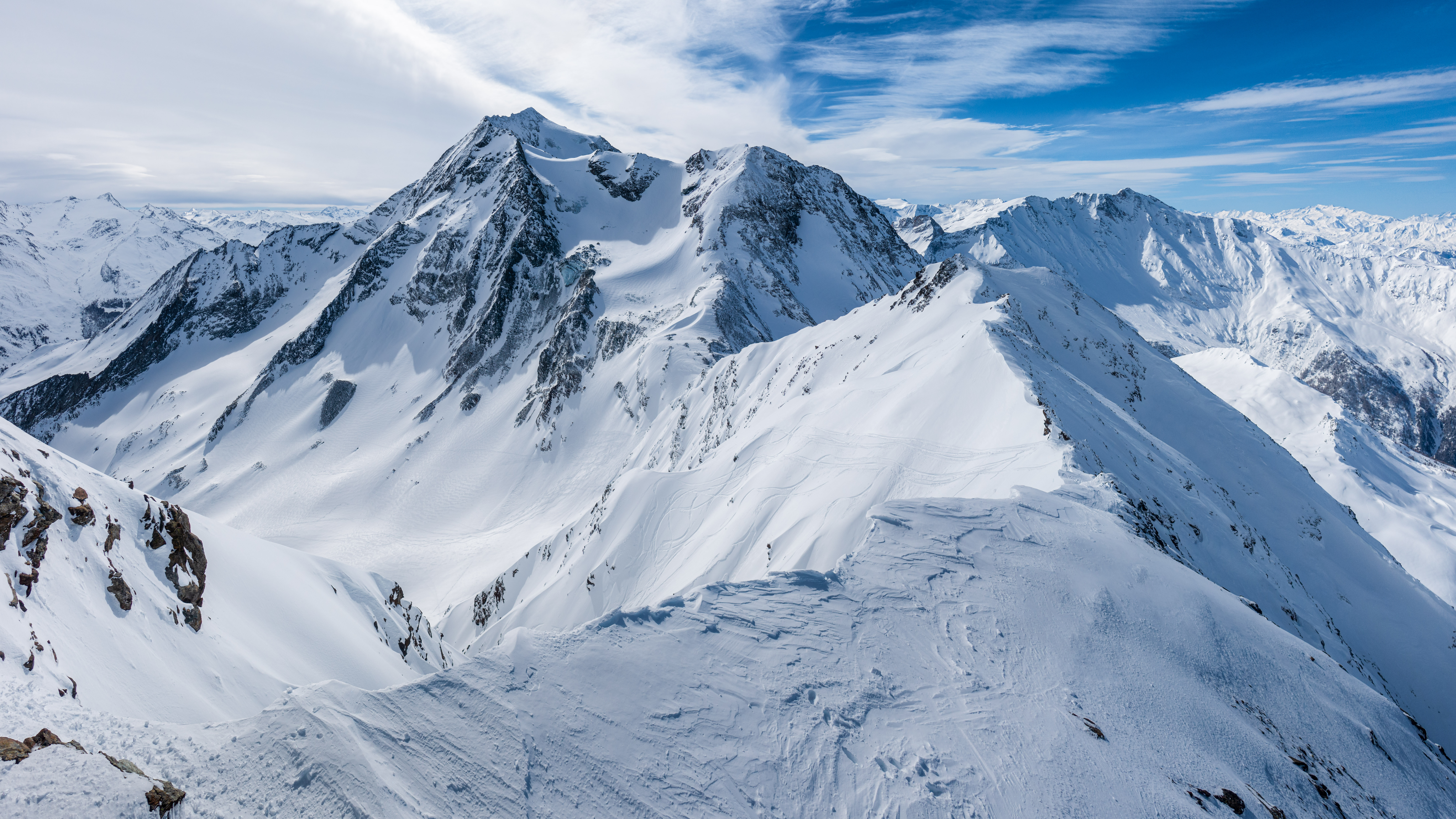

Highest point
- Elevation: 3,779 m (12,398 ft)
- Prominence: 1,132 m (3,714 ft)
- Isolation: 13.82 km (8.59 mi)
- Listing: Alpine mountains above 3000 m
- Coordinates: 45°31′42″N 6°51′36″E

Geography
- Location within France
- Location: Savoie, France
- Parent range: Vanoise Massif (Graian Alps)

Mont Pourri (3,779 m) is a mountain in the Vanoise Massif in the Graian Alps. It is located in the Vanoise National Park, nearby Les Arcs ski resort.
