= Pointe de Tierce =

Mountain in Savoie, France

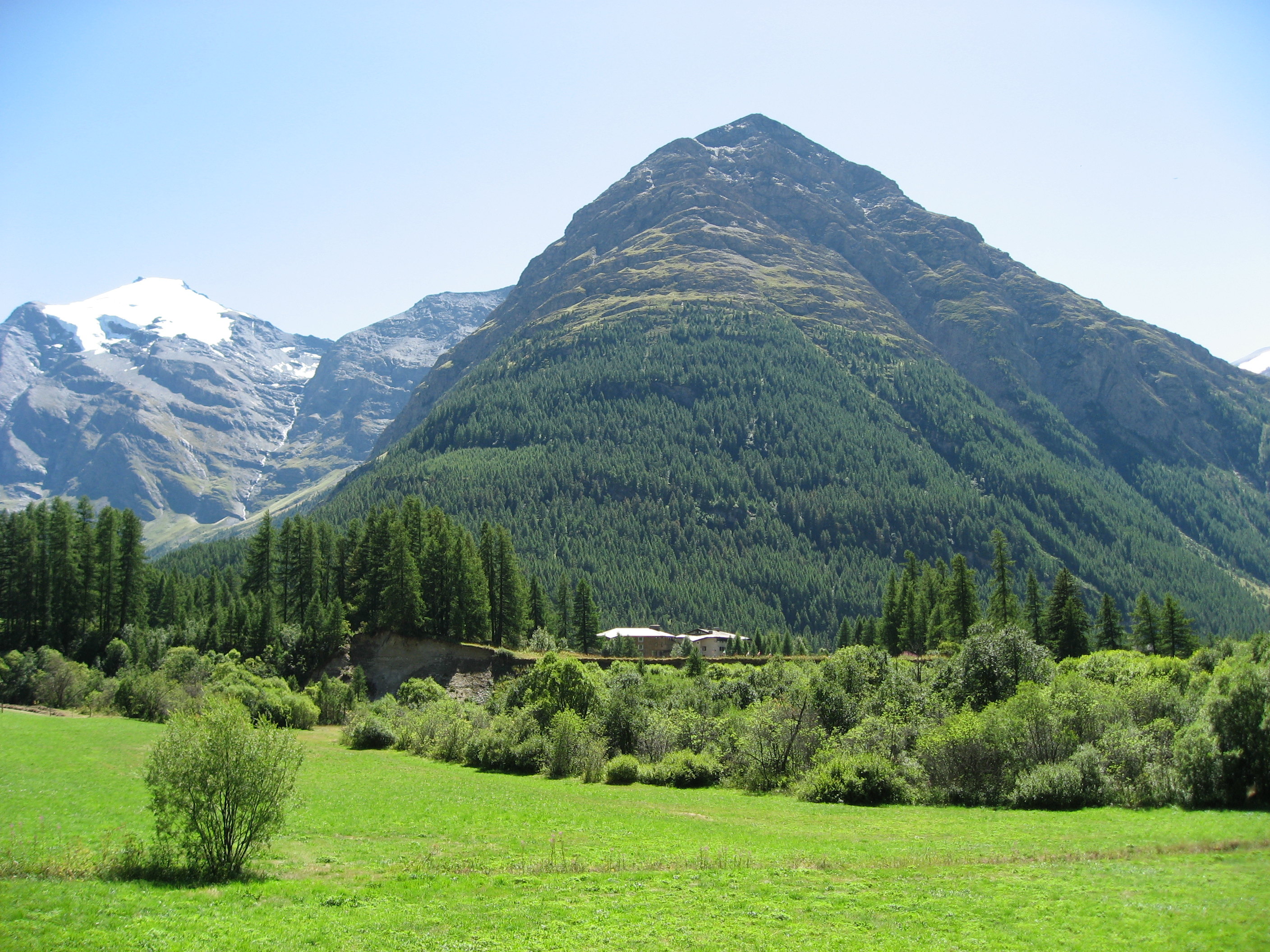

Highest point
- Elevation: 2,973 m (9,754 ft)
- Coordinates: 45°18′30″N 07°00′47″E

Geography
- Location within France
- Location: Savoie, France
- Parent range: Graian Alps

Pointe de Tierce is a mountain in Savoie, France which lies in the Graian Alps range. It has an elevation of 2,973 metres above sea level.
