= Grand Nomenon =

Mountain in Italy

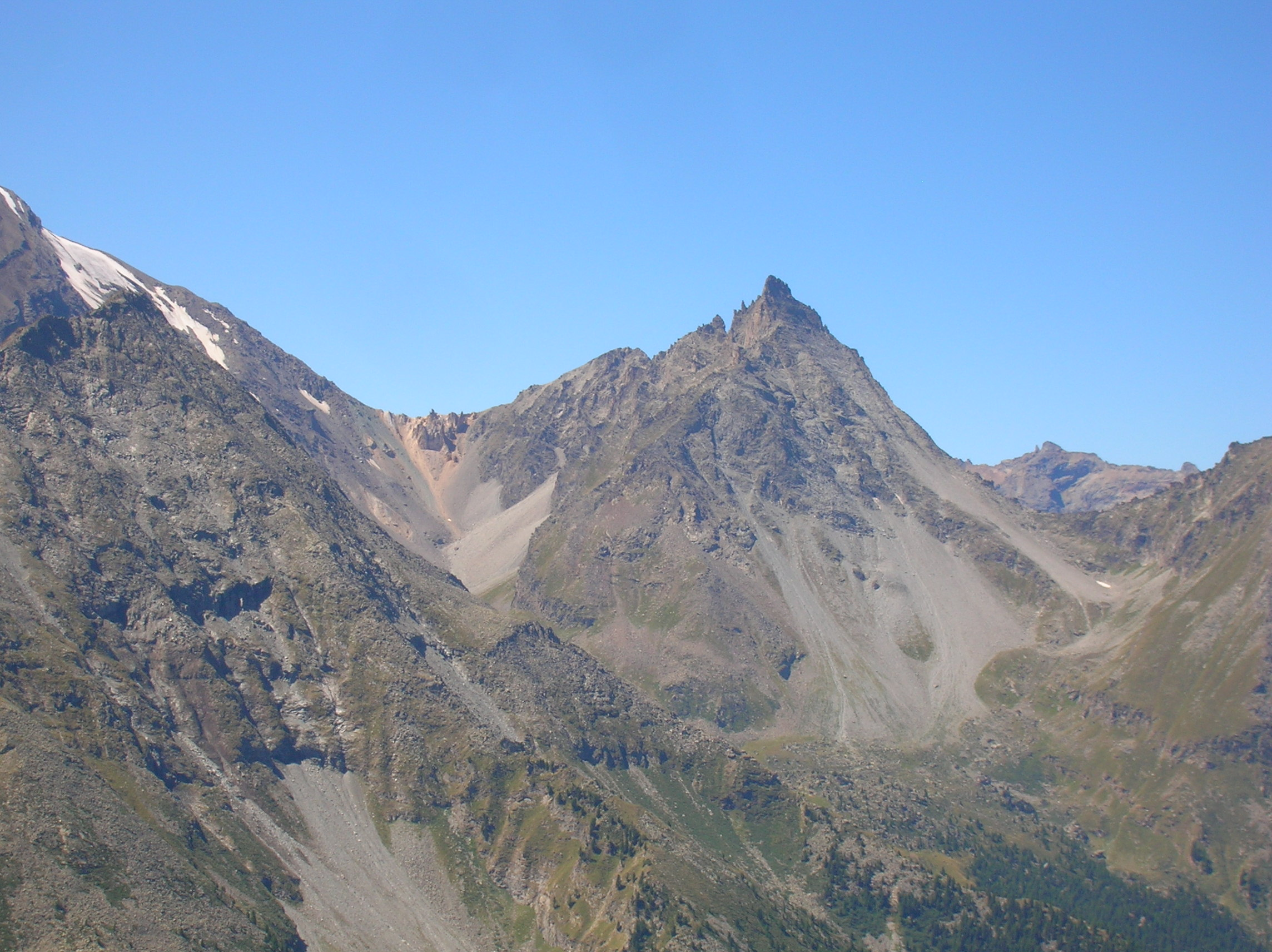
- Grand Nomenon

Highest point
- Elevation: 3,488 m (11,444 ft)
- Prominence: 396 m (1,299 ft)
- Listing: Alpine mountains above 3000 m
- Coordinates: 45°36′43″N 7°14′10″E

Geography
- Location within Alps
- Location: Aosta Valley, Italy
- Parent range: Graian Alps

Climbing
- First ascent: 1877

Grand Nomenon (3,488m) is a mountain of the Graian Alps in Aosta Valley, Italy.

Despite being a fine pyramidal peak in its own right, Grand Nomenon lives somewhat in the shadow of its giant southern neighbour Grivola. The summit however provides a fantastic panorama and climbs usually start from the Cogne Valley to the north.
