= Testa del Rutor =

Mountain in Italy

- Tête du Ruitor
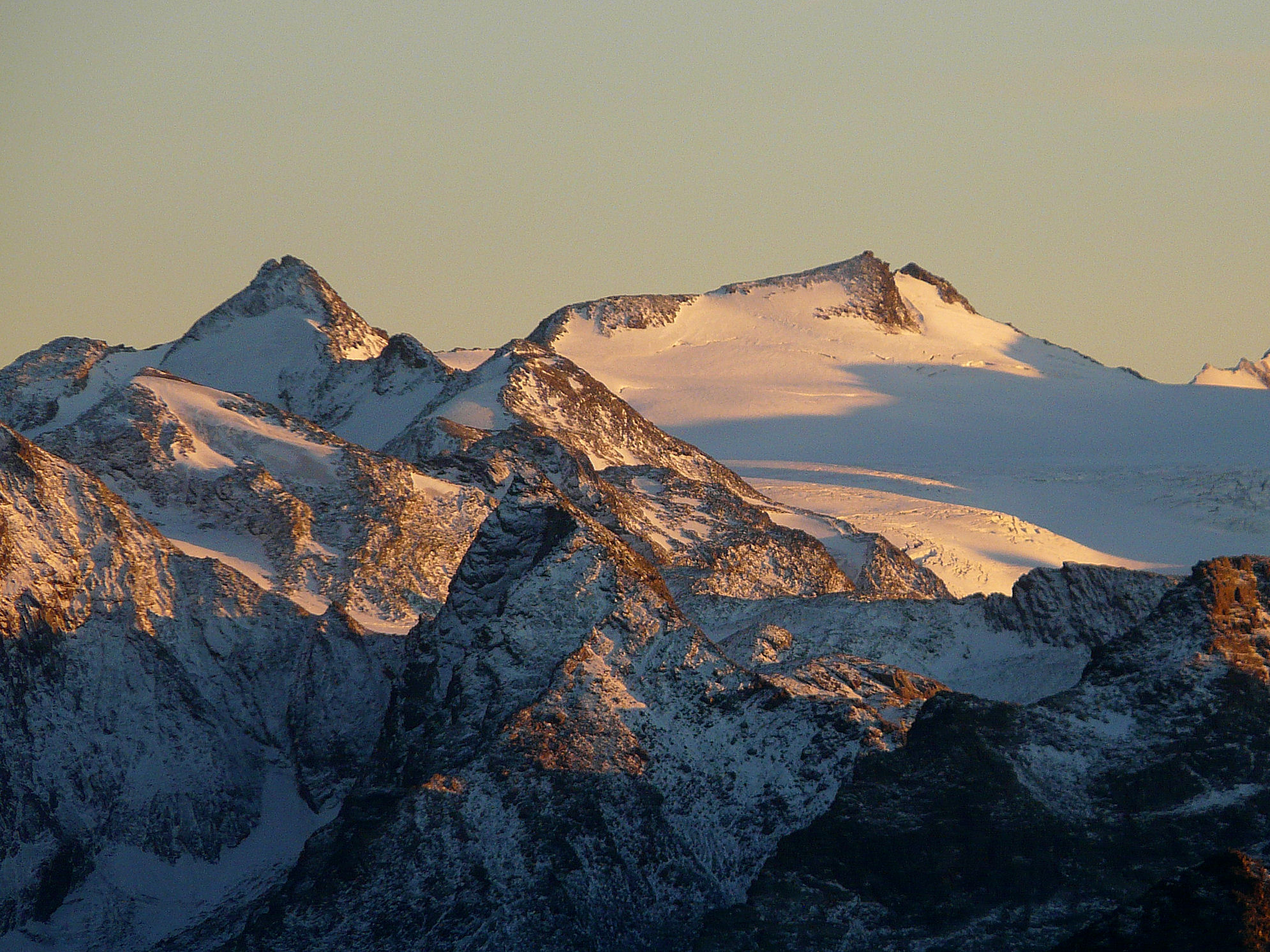
- Testa del Rutor (right) from the West

Highest point
- Elevation: 3,486 m (11,437 ft)
- Prominence: 847 m (2,779 ft)
- Isolation: 9.16 km (5.69 mi)
- Listing: Alpine mountains above 3000 m
- Coordinates: 45°38′N 7°1′E

Geography
- Location within Alps
- Location: Aosta Valley, Italy
- Parent range: Graian Alps

Testa del Rutor or Tête du Ruitor (3,486m) is a mountain of the Graian Alps in Aosta Valley, north-western Italy. It is the highest summit of the Rutor-Léchaud Group, lying roughly between the Mont Blanc Massif and the Vanoise Massif. The large Rutor Glacier lies on its northern slopes. The mountain is rarely climbed except by Italy's mountain troops, the Alpini, who use it for training.

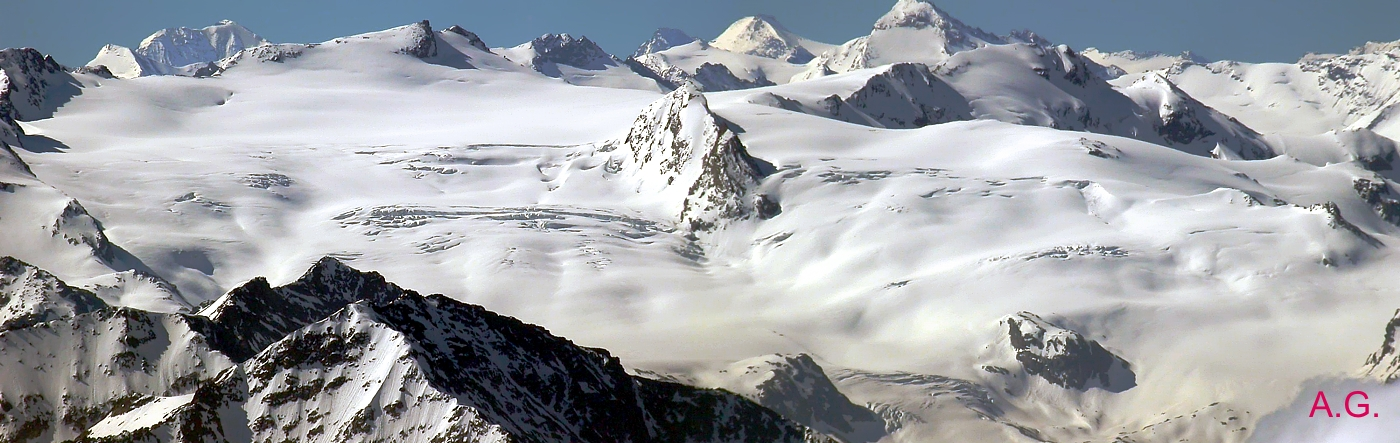
The Glacier del Rutor
