= Uia di Ciamarella =

Mountain in Italy

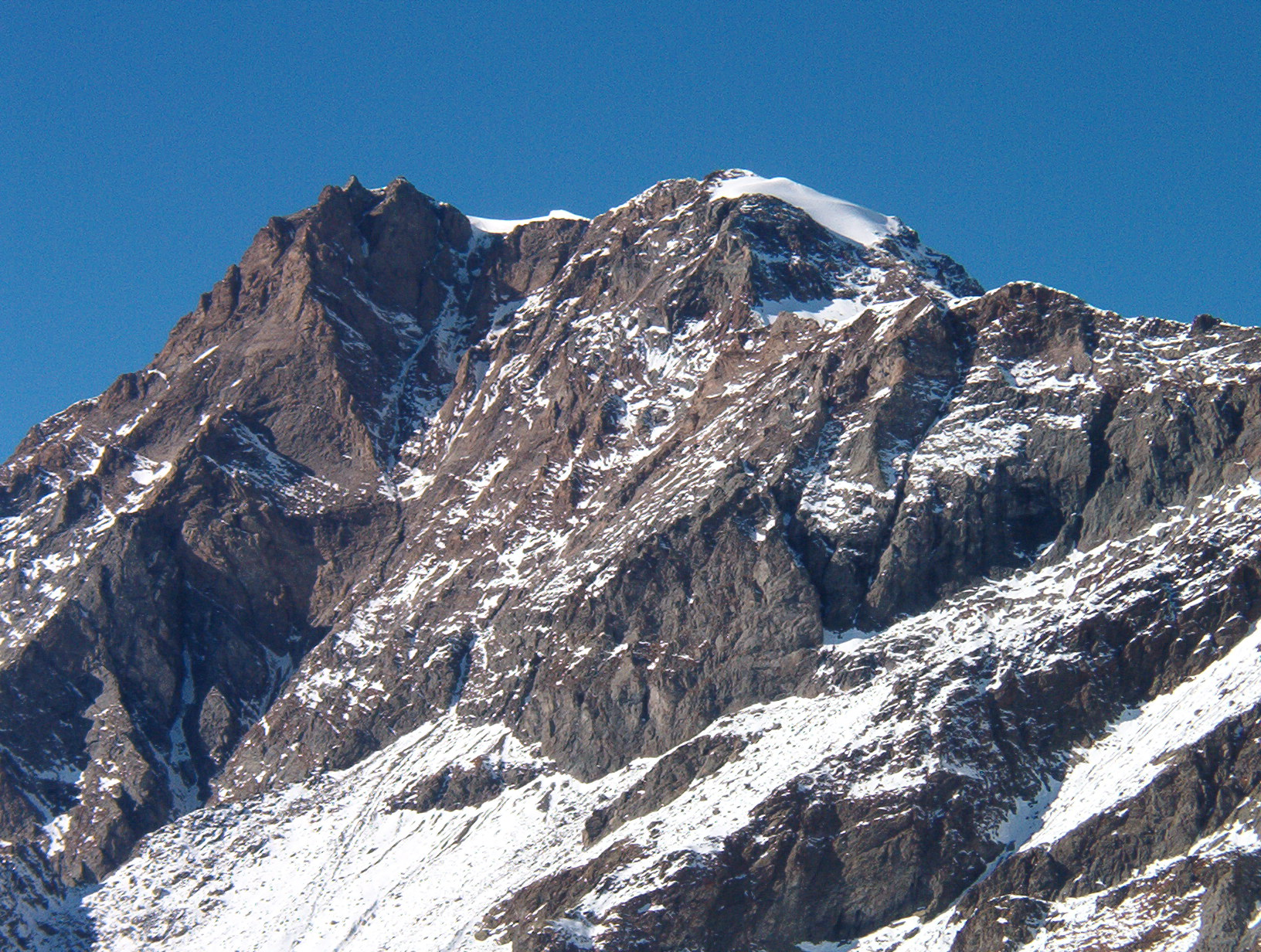

Highest point
- Elevation: 3,676 m (12,060 ft)
- Prominence: 664 m (2,178 ft)
- Isolation: 8.78 km (5.46 mi)
- Listing: Alpine mountains above 3000 m
- Coordinates: 45°19′48″N 07°08′39″E

Geography
- Location within Alps
- Location: Piedmont, Italy; Rhône-Alpes, France
- Parent range: Graian Alps

Uia di Ciamarella or just Ciamarella (3,676 m) is a mountain of the Graian Alps on the border between France and Italy.

== SOIUSA classification ==
According to the SOIUSA (International Standardized Mountain Subdivision of the Alps) the mountain can be classified in the following way:

- main part = Western Alps
- major sector = North Western Alps
- section = Graian Alps
- subsection = South-Eastern Graian Alps
- supergroup = catena Arnas-Ciamarella (It) / chaîne Ouille d'Arbéon - Ciamarella (Fr)
- group = gruppo Ciamarella-Mondrone
- subgroup = sottogruppo della Ciamarella
- code = I/B-7.I-B.6.a

== Maps ==
Media related to Uia di Ciamarella at Wikimedia Commons

- French official cartography (Institut géographique national - IGN); on-line version: www.geoportail.fr
- Istituto Geografico Centrale - Carta dei sentieri e dei rifugi 1:50.000 nr 2 Valli di Lanzo e Moncenisio
