= Pointe de Charbonnel =

Mountain in Savoie, France

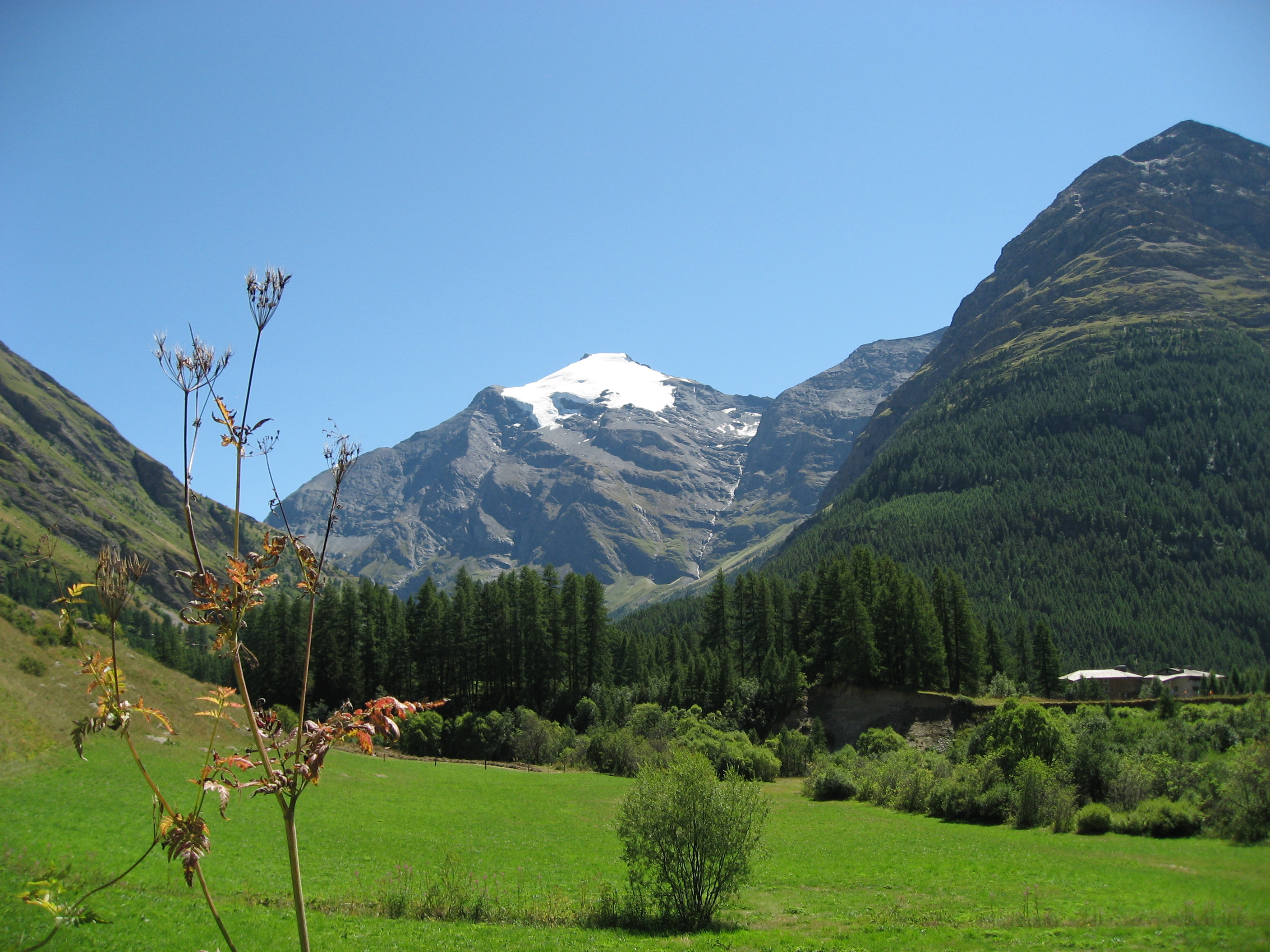

Highest point
- Elevation: 3,752 m (12,310 ft)
- Prominence: 997 m (3,271 ft)
- Isolation: 22.5 km (14.0 mi)
- Listing: Alpine mountains above 3000 m
- Coordinates: 45°16′51″N 07°03′20″E

Geography
- Location within France
- Location: Savoie, France
- Parent range: Graian Alps

Pointe de Charbonnel is a mountain of Savoie, France. It lies in the Graian Alps range. It has an elevation of 3,752 metres above sea level.

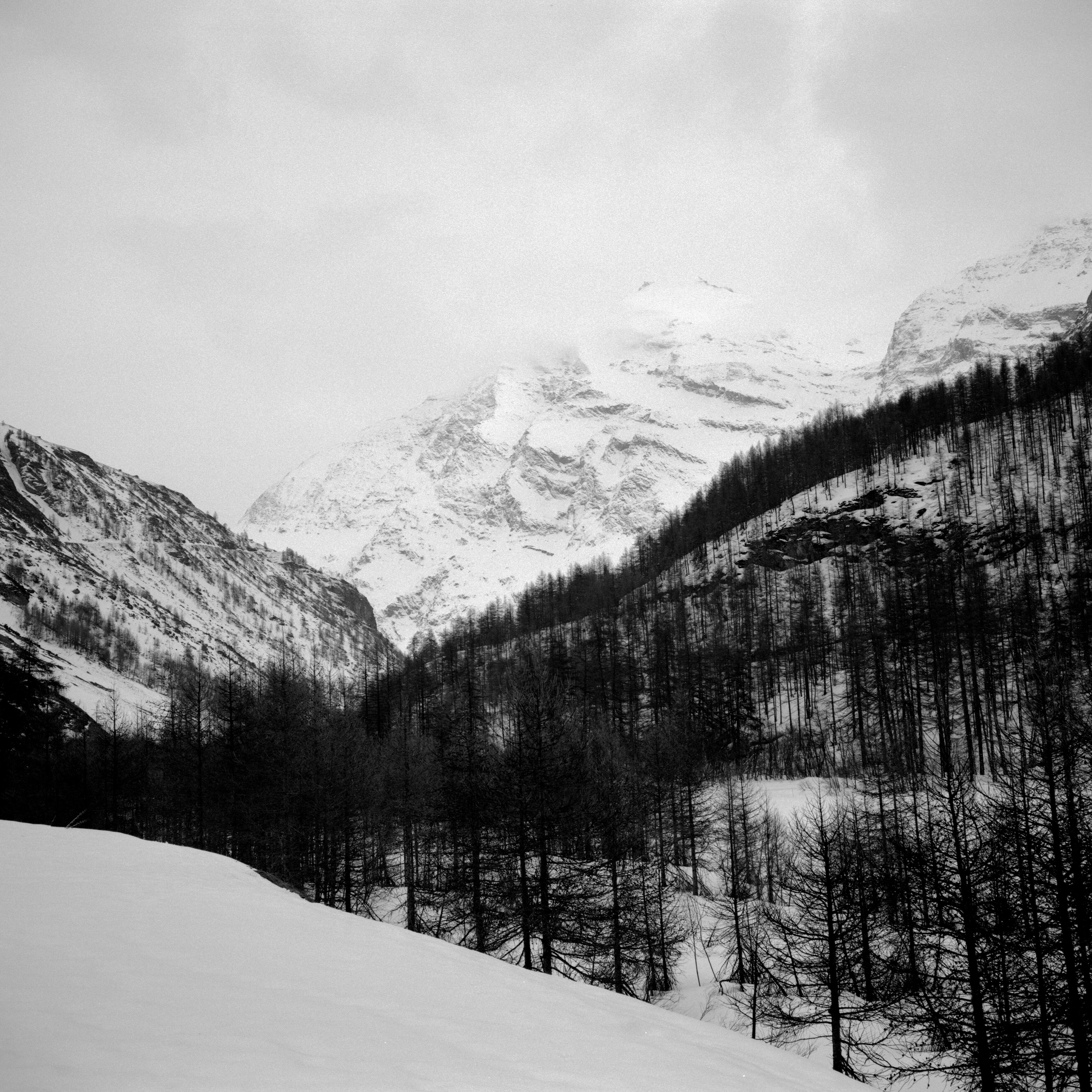
Pointe de Charbonnel in winter
