= Traves, Piedmont =

Traves Tràves (Piedmontese) Tràves (Arpitan)
- Comune
- Comune di Traves
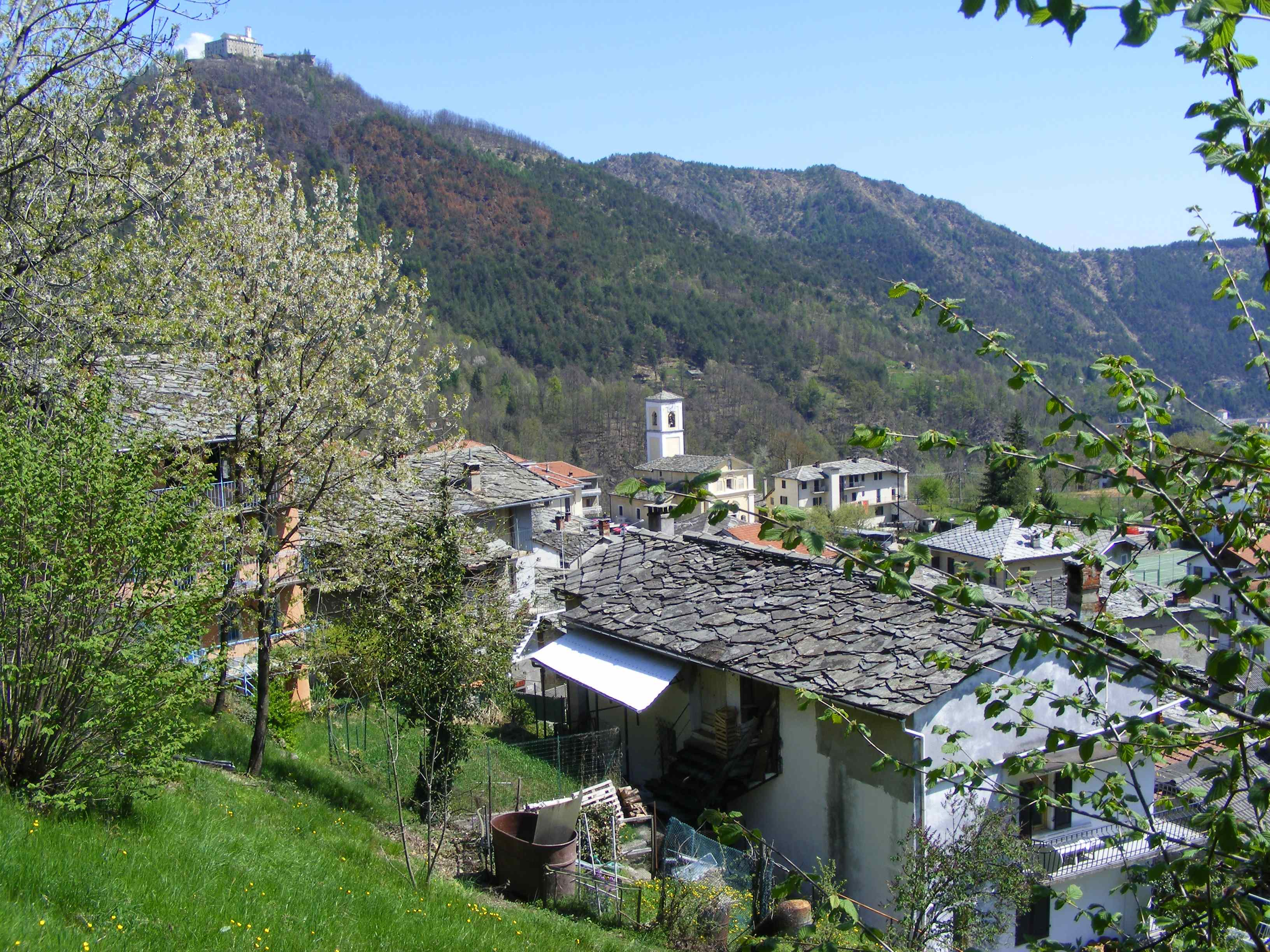

- Coat of arms

- Location within Italy Location within Piedmont
- Coordinates: 45°16′N 7°26′E
- Country: Italy
- Region: Piedmont
- Metropolitan city: Turin (TO)

Government
  - Mayor: Antonio Osvaldo Cagliero

Area
  - Total: 10.7 km^{2} (4.1 sq mi)
- Elevation: 628 m (2,060 ft)

Population (30 September 2010)
  - Total: 561
  - Density: 52.4/km^{2} (136/sq mi)
- Demonym: Travesini
- Time zone: UTC+1 (CET)
  - Summer (DST): UTC+2 (CEST)
- Postal code: 10070
- Dialing code: 0123
- Website: Official website

Traves (Piedmontese and Arpitan: Tràves) is a comune (municipality) in the Metropolitan City of Turin in the Italian region Piedmont, located about 30 km northwest of Turin.

Traves borders the following municipalities: Mezzenile, Pessinetto, Viù, and Germagnano.

The commune is less ancient than others in the valley and the parish church was built only in the seventeenth century.

The main activity of the village has been, for a long time, the exploitation of copper and nickel mines and its inhabitants were specialized in the production of nails.

Today the economy is based on tourism and on the work of commuters who reach the municipalities of the plain. In the village there is an "Ecomuseo dei Chiodaioli" (an ancient foundry)

Associations of the municiaplity animate summer events, including festivals. They include the two patronal festivals of Santa Blandina (June 2) and San Pietro in Vincoli (in the first weekend of August), and some festivities dedicated to the chapels located in the various hamlets of the municipality and to the numerous voluntary associations.
