= Mezzenile =

Mezzenile Mesnil (Piedmontese) Misinì (Arpitan)
- Comune
- Comune di Mezzenile
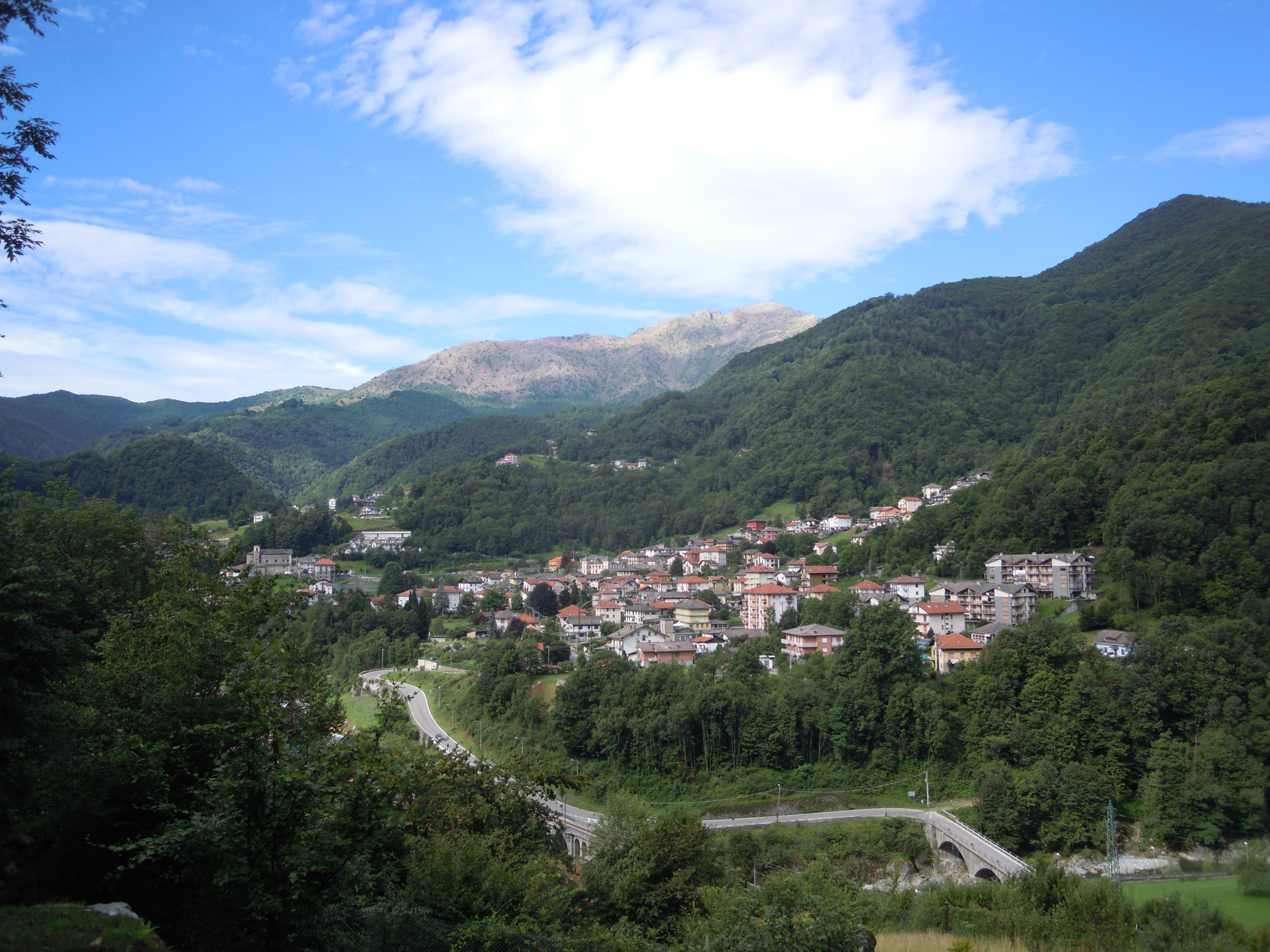

- Location within Italy Location within Piedmont
- Coordinates: 45°18′N 7°24′E
- Country: Italy
- Region: Piedmont
- Metropolitan city: Turin (TO)
- Frazioni: Bogliano, Catelli, Monti, Murasse, Pugnetto, Sabbione, Villa Inferiore, Villa Superiore

Government
  - Mayor: Sergio Pocchiola Viter

Area
  - Total: 29.09 km^{2} (11.23 sq mi)
- Elevation: 654 m (2,146 ft)

Population (31 August 2021)
  - Total: 739
  - Density: 25.4/km^{2} (65.8/sq mi)
- Demonym: Mezzenilesi
- Time zone: UTC+1 (CET)
  - Summer (DST): UTC+2 (CEST)
- Postal code: 10070
- Dialing code: 0123
- Patron saint: St. Martin
- Saint day: November 11
- Website: Official website

Mezzenile (Piedmontese: Mesnil, Arpitan: Misinì) is a comune (municipality) in the Metropolitan City of Turin in the Italian region of Piedmont, located about 35 kilometres (22 mi) northwest of Turin.

The caves of Pugnetto are located in a fraction of Mezzenile, on the road from Traves, Piedmont.
