= Germagnano =

Germagnano Djermagnan (Piedmontese) Sen German (Arpitan)
- Comune
- Comune di Germagnano
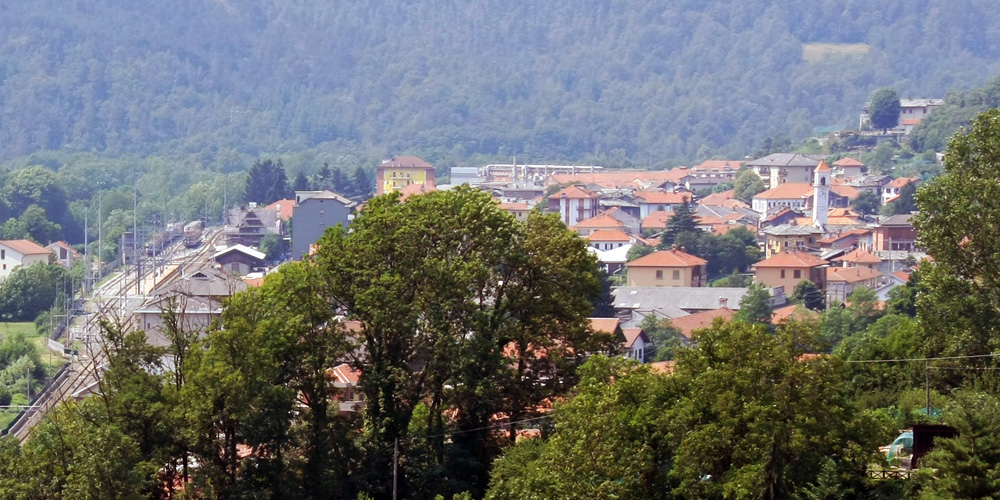

- Location within Italy Location within Piedmont
- Coordinates: 45°16′N 7°28′E
- Country: Italy
- Region: Piedmont
- Metropolitan city: Turin (TO)

Government
  - Mayor: Mirella Martini

Area
  - Total: 14.44 km^{2} (5.58 sq mi)
- Elevation: 485 m (1,591 ft)

Population (30 November 2017)
  - Total: 1,174
  - Density: 81.30/km^{2} (210.6/sq mi)
- Demonym: Germagnanesi
- Time zone: UTC+1 (CET)
  - Summer (DST): UTC+2 (CEST)
- Postal code: 10070
- Dialing code: 0123
- Patron saint: St. Gratus Bishop
- Saint day: 7 September
- Website: Official website

Germagnano (Piedmontese: Djermagnan, Arpitan: Sen German) is a comune (municipality) in the Metropolitan City of Turin in the Italian region Piedmont, located about 30 kilometres (19 mi) northwest of Turin in the Valli di Lanzo. It has a station on the Turin-Ceres railway.
