= Graian Alps =

Mountain range in the western part of the Alps

- Alpes grées (French); Alpi Graie (Italian)
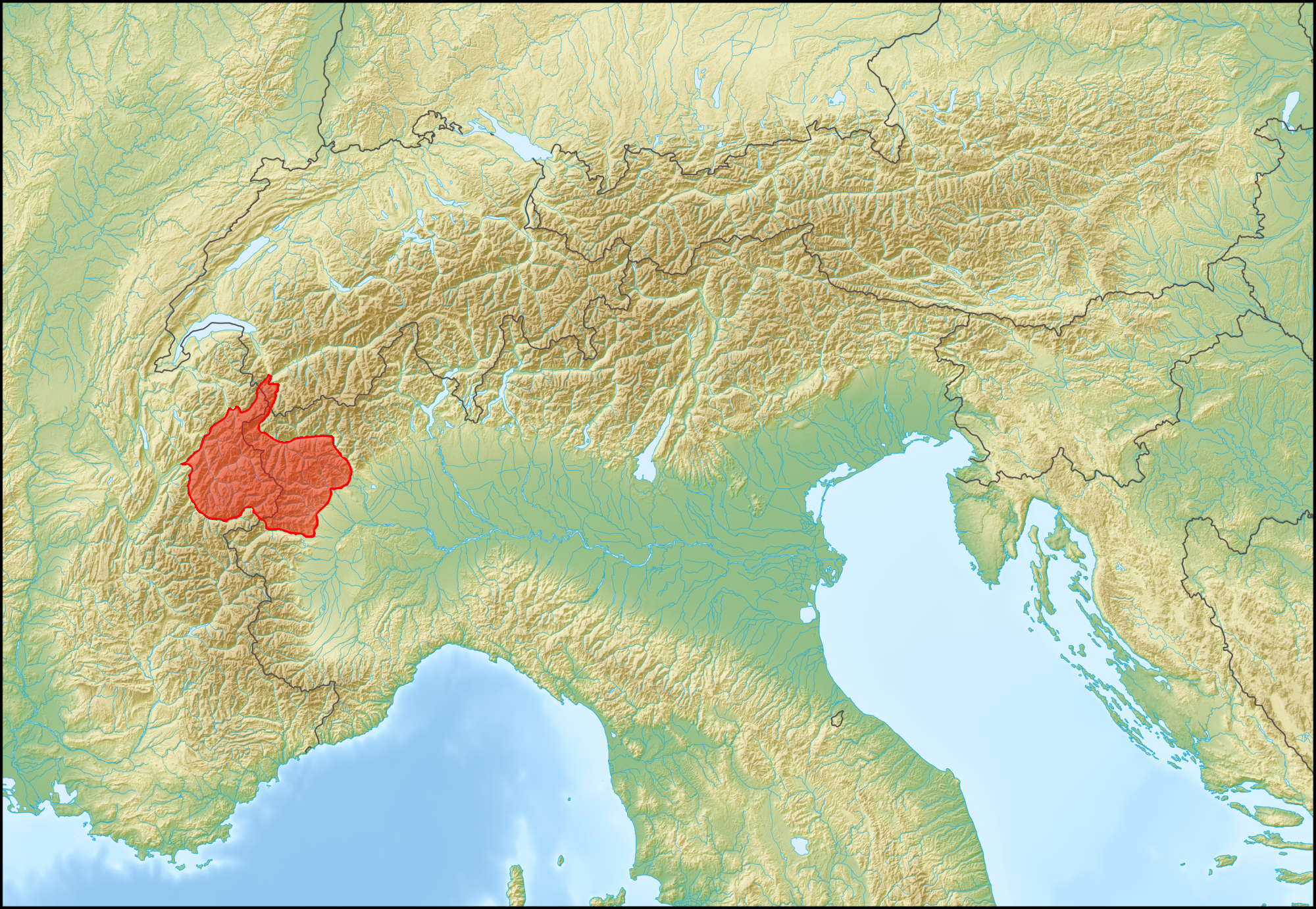
- Graian Alps (in red) within the Alps. The borders of the range according to Partizione delle Alpi & SOIUSA

Highest point
- Peak: Mont Blanc
- Elevation: 4,810.45 m (15,782.3 ft)
- Coordinates: 45°50′1″N 6°51′54″E

Geography
- Countries: France; Italy; Switzerland
- Provinces/Regions: Auvergne-Rhône-Alpes; Piedmont; Aosta Valley; Valais
- Range coordinates: 45°30′N 7°10′E
- Parent range: Alps
- Borders on: Cottian Alps; Dauphiné Alps; Savoy Prealps; Bernese Alps; Pennine Alps; Po plain

Geology
- Orogeny: Alpine orogeny

The Graian Alps (/ˈɡreɪən, ˈɡraɪən/ GR(A)Y-ən; French: Alpes grées [alp ɡʁe]; Italian: Alpi Graie [ˈalpi ˈɡraːje]; Latin: Alpes Graiæ) are a mountain range in the western part of the Alps, and the name of an Ancient Roman province.

== Etymology ==
The name Graie comes from the Graioceli Celtic tribe, which dwelled in the area surrounding the Mont Cenis pass and the Viù valley. Other sources claim that the name comes from the Celtic Graig meaning "rock" or "stone", literally the Rocky Mountains.

The name of the ancient Roman province comes from the local celtic god Graius.

== Geography ==
The Graian Alps are located in France (Auvergne-Rhône-Alpes), Italy (Piedmont and the Aosta Valley), and Switzerland (western Valais).

The French side of the Graian Alps is drained by the river Isère (Tarentaise valley) and its tributary Arc (Maurienne valley), and by the Arve. The Italian side is drained by the rivers Dora Riparia, Dora Baltea, Orco and Stura di Lanzo, tributaries of the Po.

The Graian Alps can also be divided into the following four groups:

- the Mont Blanc group (north of the Little St Bernard Pass), including the Beaufortain Massif
- the Central group (the watershed between the Little St Bernard Pass and the Col du Mont Cenis)
- the Western or French group,
- and the Eastern or Italian group, including the Gran Paradiso Massif.

== Peaks ==
The main peaks of the Graian Alps are:

=== Mont Blanc group ===
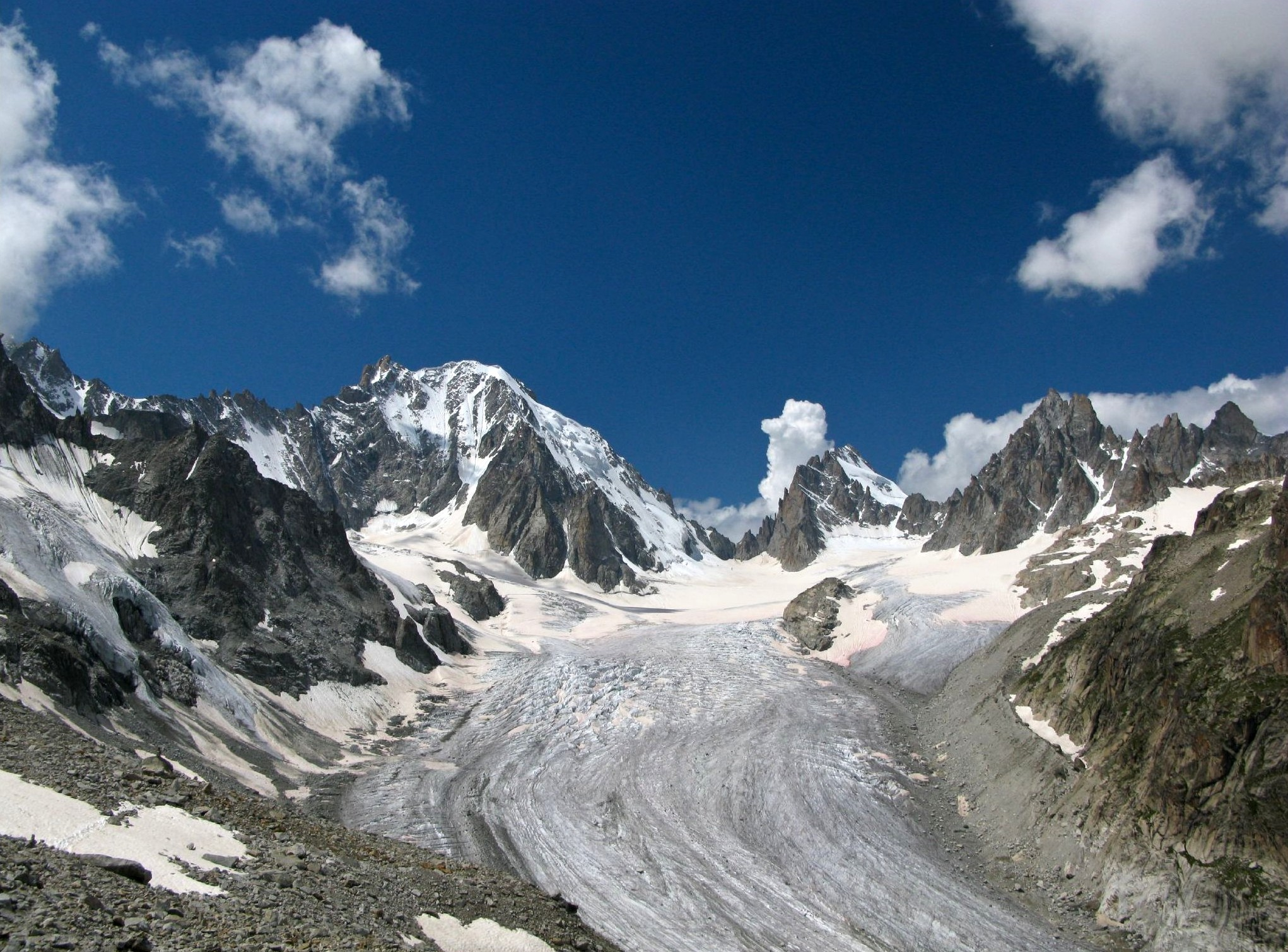
Aiguille d'Argentière above the Saleina Glacier

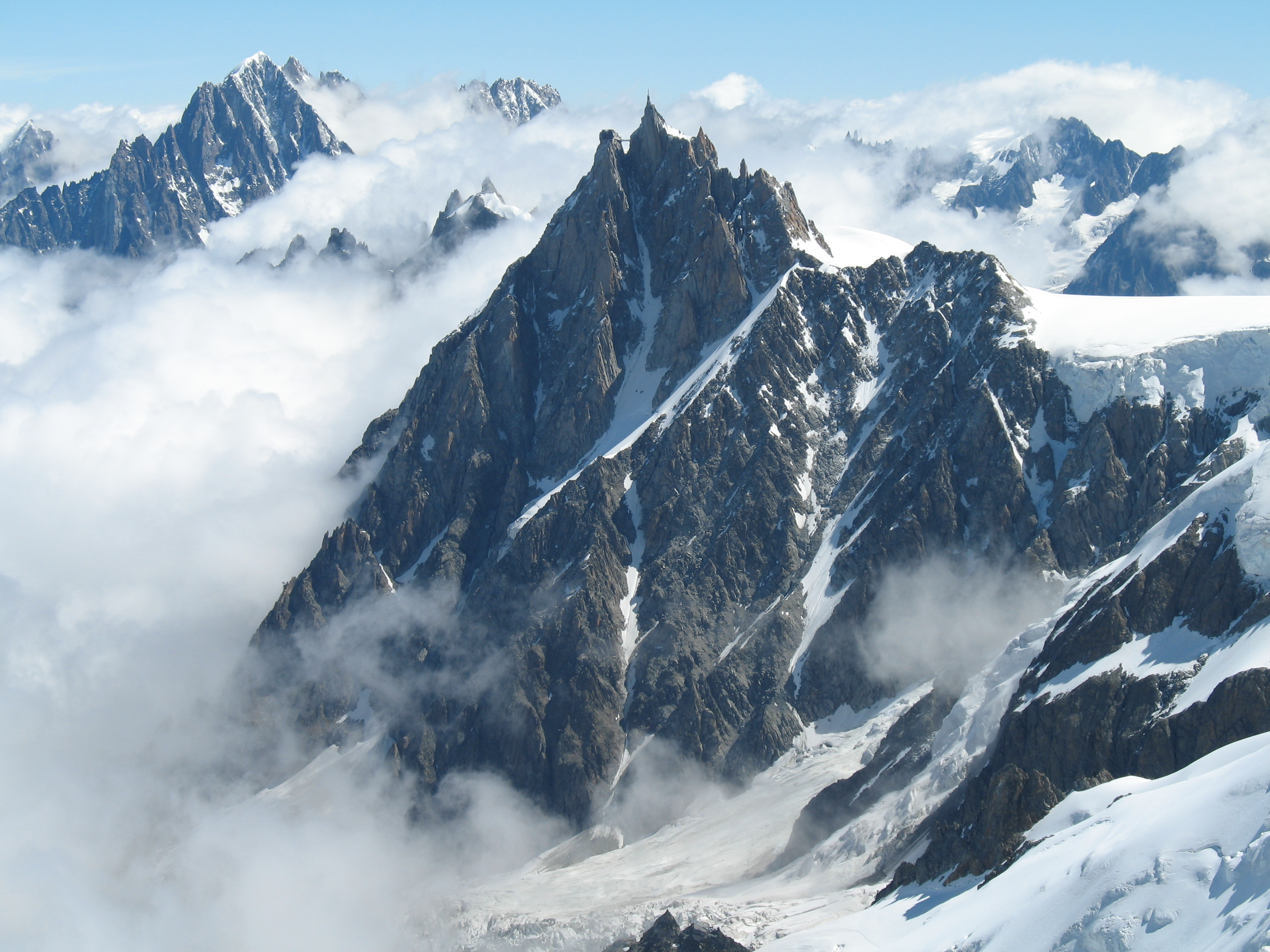
Aiguille du Midi

Name	metres	feet
Mont Blanc	4,810.45	15,782
Mont Maudit	4,471	14,669
Dôme du Goûter	4,331	14,210
Grandes Jorasses	4,205	13,797
Aiguille Verte	4,127	13,541
Aiguille de Bionnassay	4,066	13,341
Dent du Géant	4,013	13,166
Aiguille de Tré la Tête	3,911	12,832
Aiguille d'Argentière	3,902	12,802
Aiguille de Triolet	3,876	12,717
Aiguille du Midi	3,843	12,609
Tour Noir	3,836	12,586
Aiguille des Glaciers	3,834	12,579
Mont Dolent	3,823	12,543
Aiguille du Chardonnet	3,822	12,540
Aiguille du Dru	3,754	12,316
Dômes de Miage	3,688	12,100
Aiguille du Tour	3,540	11,615
Aiguille du Grépon	3,502	11,489
Aiguille des Charmoz	3,442	11,293
Aiguille du Tacul	3,438	11,280
Pointe d'Orny	3,274	10,742
Mont Favre	3,259	10,693
Tour Sallière	3,227	10,588
Pointe de Léchaud	3,127	10,260
Mont Buet	3,109	10,201
Mont Ruan	3,078	10,099
Roignais	2,995	9,826
Pic de Tenneverge	2,982	9,784
Aiguille du Belvédère (Aigs Rouges)	2,966	9,731
Crammont	2,737	8,980
Pointe des Fours	2,719	8,921
Pointe du Colloney	2,692	8,832
Catogne	2,599	8,527
Mont Joly	2,527	8,291
Brevent	2,525	8,284
Pointe de Sales	2,494	8,183
Aiguille de Varan	2,488	8,163
Aiguille Croche	2,487	8,159
Mont Chétif	2,343	7,687

=== Central group ===
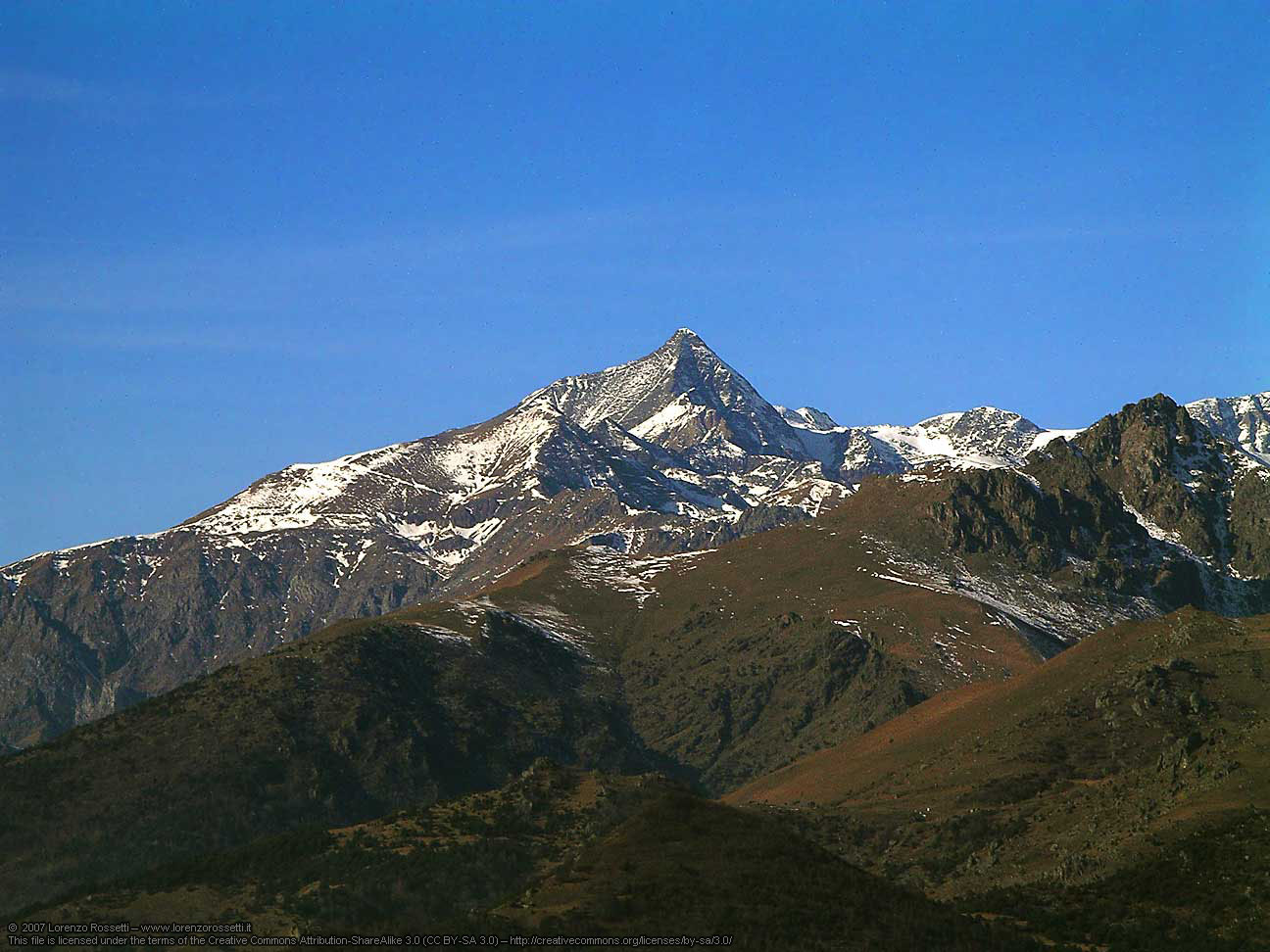
Rocciamelone

Name	metres	feet	Name	metres	feet
Pointe de Charbonnel	3760	12,336	Grande Aiguille Rousse	3482	11,424
Aiguille de la Grande Sassière	3751	12,306	Granta-Parey	3473	11,395
Uia di Ciamarella	3676	12,061	Roc du Moulinet	3469	11,382
Albaron	3638	11,936	Aiguille Pers	3451	11,323
Pointe de Ronce	3618	11,871	Pointe de la Galise	3345	10,975
Levanna	3619	11,874	Pointe de la Traversière	3341	10,962
Bec de l'Invergnan	3608	11,838	Ormelune/Pointe d'Archeboc	3283	10,771
Tsanteleina	3606	11,831	Signal du Mont Iseran	3241	10,634
Bessanèse	3597	11,801	Grand Assaly	3174	10,413
Croce Rossa	3566	11,703	Torre d'Ovarda	3075	10,089
Punta d'Arnas	3540	11,615	Dôme de Val d'Isère	3033	9,951
Rocciamelone	3537	11,605	Pointe de Tierce	2973	9,754
Punta Chalanson	3530	11,582	Uia di Mondrone	2964	9,725
Grande Traversière	3495	11,467	Punta Lunella	2272	7,454
Testa del Rutor	3486	11,438	Monte Civrari	2302	7,553

It also includes Roche Michel at 3429 m.

=== Eastern group ===
Name	metres	feet	Name	metres	feet
Gran Paradiso	4061	13,324	Grand Nomenon	3513	11,444
Grivola	3969	13,022	Mont Tout Blanc	3438	11,280
Herbétet	3778	12,396	Punta Sengie	3408	11,182
Torre del Gran San Pietro	3692	12,113	Punta Lavina	3308	10,854
Ciarforon	3665	12,025	Rosa dei Banchi	3164	10,381
Roccia Viva	3650	11,976	Becca di Nona	3142	10,309
Becca di Gay	3623	11,887	Punta Pousset	3046	9,994
Monte Emilius	3559	11,677	Monte Colombo	2848	9,344
Punta Tersiva	3513	11,526	Monte Marzo	2750	9,023

=== Western group ===
Name	metres	feet	Name	metres	feet
Grande Casse	3855	12,648	Pointe de l'Échelle	3422	11,227
Mont Pourri	3779	12,398	Bellecôte	3417	11,211
Dent Parrachée	3697	12,129	Pointes de la Gliere	3386	11,109
Grande Motte	3653	11,985	Pointe de Méan Martin	3337	10,949
Dôme de l'Arpont	3601	11,808	Roche Chevrière	3252	10,669
Dôme de Chasseforêt	3586	11,765	Aiguille Rouge	3227	10,584
Aiguille de Péclet	3566	11,700	Pointe de la Réchasse	3223	10,575
Aiguille de Polset	3538	11,608	Petit Mont Blanc de Pralognan	2685	8809
Pointe de la Sana	3436	11,273	Mont Jovet	2563	8409

== Passes ==
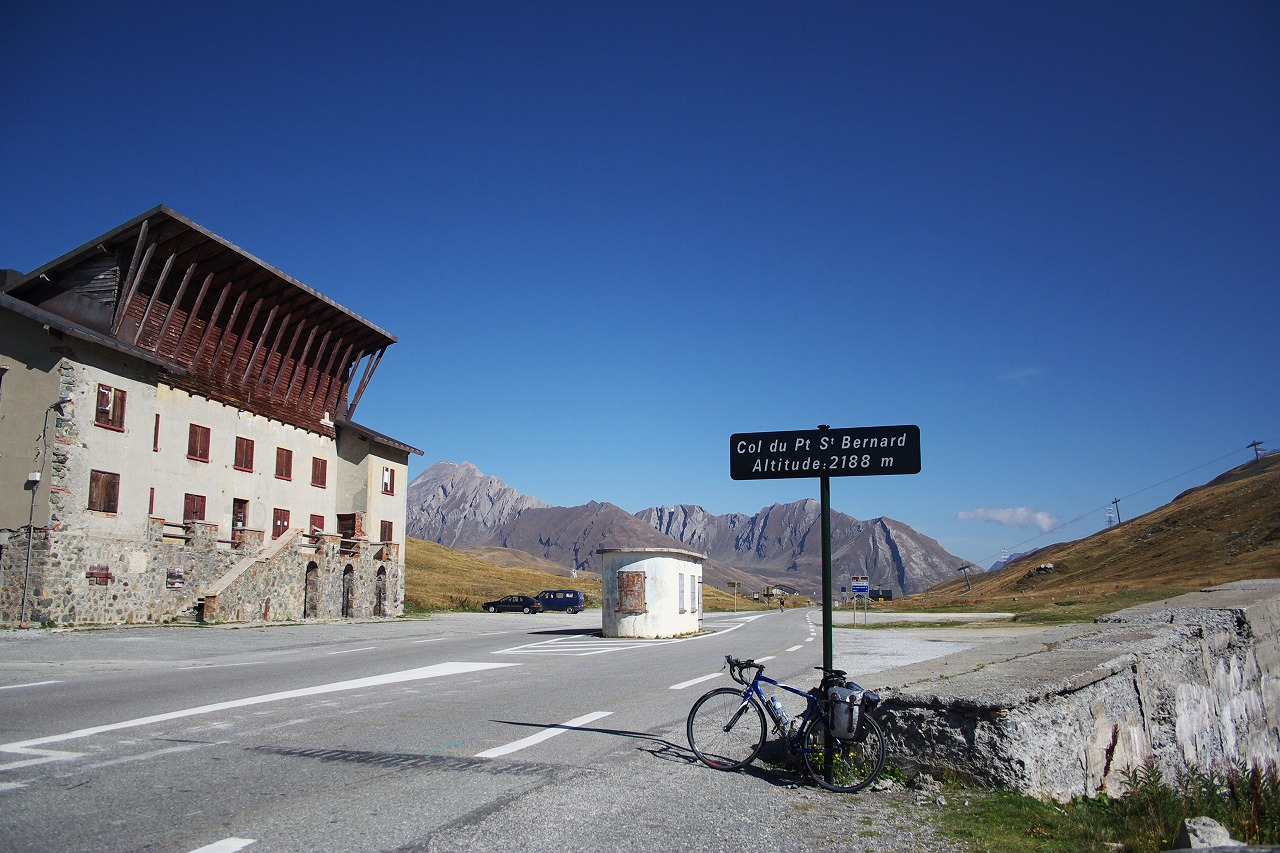
Little St Bernard Pass

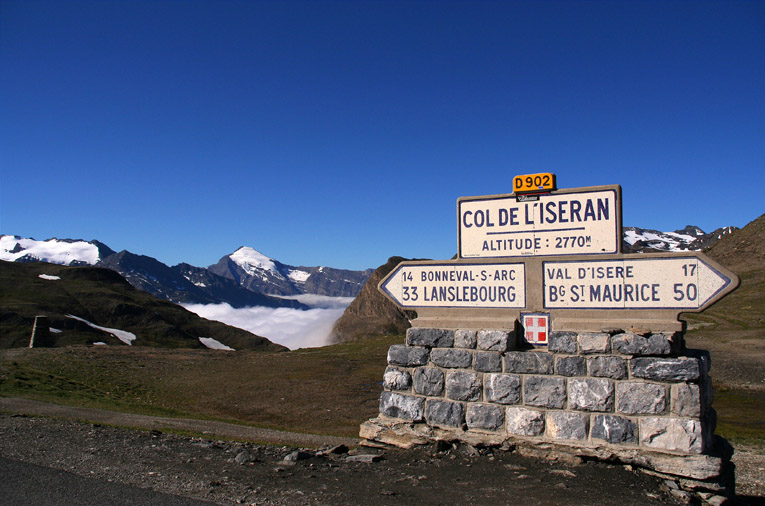
Iseran Pass

The main passes of the Graian Alps are shown in the table below. The group in which the pass is located is indicated with "MB" for Mont Blanc group, "C" for Central group, "E" for Eastern group, and "W" for Western group.

name	location	group	type	elevation (m/ft)	
Col de la Brenva	Courmayeur to Chamonix	MB	snow	4,333	14,217
Col de Triolet	Chamonix to Courmayeur	MB	snow	3,691	12,110
Col d'Argentière	Chamonix to Orsières	MB	snow	3,516	11,536
Col de la Grande Rousse	Rhêmes Valley to Valgrisenche	C	snow	3500	11,483
Col de Talefre	Chamonix to Courmayeur	MB	snow	3,484	11,430
Col de Gebroulaz	Modane to Méribel	W	snow	3470	11,385
Col de Monel	Cogne to Locana	E	snow	3428	11,247
Col de Miage	Les Contamines to Courmayeur	MB	snow	3,376	11,077
Col du Géant	Chamonix to Courmayeur	MB	snow	3,371	11,060
Col du Grand Paradis	Ceresole Reale to Valsavarenche	E	snow	3349	10,988
Col du Charforon	Ceresole Reale to Valsavarenche	E	snow	3331	10,929
Col de Teleccio	Cogne to Locana	E	snow	3326	10,913
Col du Chardonnet	Chamonix to Orsières	MB	snow	3,325	10,909
Col de Lauzon	Cogne to the Valsavarenche	E	bridle path	3301	10,831
Col du Bouquetin	Bonneval-sur-Arc to Val d'Isère	C	snow	3300	10,827
Col de St Grat	Valgrisenche to La Thuile	C	snow	3300	10,827
Col du Tour	Chamonix to Orsières	MB	snow	3,280	10,762
Fenêtre de Saleinaz	Saleinaz Glacier to Trient Glacier	MB	snow	3,264	10,709
Col de l'Herbetet	Cogne to Valsavarenche	E	snow	3257	10,686
Col du Collerin	Bessans to Balme	C	snow	3202	10,506
Col du Grand Etret	Ceresole Reale to Valsavaranche	E	snow	3158	10,361
Col de Bassac	Rhêmes Valley to Valgrisenche	C	snow	3153	10,345
Col du Carro	Bonneval-sur-Arc to Ceresole Reale	C	snow	3140	10,302
Col d'Arbole	Cogne to Brissogne	E	snow	3137	10,292
Col de la Goletta	Val d'Isère to the Rhêmes Valley	C	snow	3120	10,237
Col de Rhêmes	Val d'Isère to the Rhêmes Valley	C	snow	3101	10,174
Col de la Grande Casse	Pralognan to Termignon	W	snow	3100	10,171
Col de Sea	Bonneval-sur-Arc to Forno Alpi Graie	C	snow	3083	10,115
Col de l'Autaret	Bessans to Usseglio	C	footpath	3070	10,073
Col de Girard	Bonneval-sur-Arc to Forno Alpi Graie	C	snow	3044	9987
Col Rosset	Valsavarenche to the Rhêmes Valley	C	bridle path	3024	9922
Col d'Arnas	Bessans to Balme	C	snow	3014	9889
Col de la Galise	Ceresole Reale to Val d'Isère	C	snow	2998	9836
Col de Sort	Valsavarenche to the Rhêmes Valley	E	bridle path	2967	9735
Quecees de Tignes	Val d'Isère to Termignon	W	snow	2940	9646
Col della Nouva	Cogne to Pont Canavese	E	bridle path	2933	9623
Col de Breuil	Bourg-Saint-Maurice to La Thuile	MB	snow	2,879	9,446
Col de Garin	Aosta to Cogne	E	footpath	2868	9411
Collarin d'Arnas	Balme to Usseglio	C	snow	2850	9351
Colle della Finestra	Rhêmes Valley to the Valgrisenche	C	footpath	2847	9341
Fenêtre de Champorcher	Cogne to Champorcher	E	bridle path	2838	9311
Col Vaudet	Sainte-Foy-Tarentaise to the Valgrisenche	C	footpath	2836	9305
Col de Bardoney	Cogne to Pont Canavese	E	snow	2833	9295
Col de Chaviere	Modane to Pralognan	W	footpath	2806	9206
Col de la Leisse	Tignes to Termignon	W	snow	2780	9121
Col de l'Iseran	Bonneval-sur-Arc to Val d'Isère	C	road	2769	9085
Ghicet di Sea	Balme to Forno Alpi Graie	C	footpath	2735	8973
Col de la Sachette	Tignes to Bourg-Saint-Maurice	W	footpath	2729	8954
Col du Palet	Tignes to Moûtiers or Bourg St Maurice	W	bridle path	2658	8721
Col du Mont	Ste Foy to the Valgrisenche	C	bridle path	2646	8681
Col du Nivolet	Ceresole Reale to the Valsavarenche	E	road	2641	8665
Colle della Crocetta	Ceresole Reale to Forno Alpi Graie	C	bridle path	2636	8649
Col de la Platiere	Saint-Jean-de-Maurienne to Moûtiers	W	bridle path	2600	8531
Col du Mont Tondu	Les Contamines to Courmayeur	MB	snow	2,590	8,498
Col Ferret	Courmayeur to Orsières	MB	bridle path	2,533	8,311
Col de la Vanoise	Pralognan to Termignon	W	bridle path	2527	8291
Col de la Seigne	Les Chapieux to Courmayeur	MB	bridle path	2,512	8,242
Col de Susanfe	Champéry to Salvan	MB	footpath	2,500	8,202
Col du Bonhomme	Contamines to Les Chapieux	MB	bridle path	2,483	8,147
Col de Sageroux	Sixt to Champéry	MB	footpath	2,413	7,917
Col des Encombres	Saint-Michel-de-Maurienne to Moûtiers	W	bridle path	2337	7668
Col d'Anterne	Sixt to Servoz	MB	bridle path	2,263	7,425
Col de Balme	Chamonix to the Trient Valley	MB	bridle path	2,201	7,221
Little St Bernard Pass	Aosta to Moûtiers	C	road	2188	7179
Mont Cenis	Modane to Susa,_Piedmont	C	road	2083	6827
Col de la Madeleine	La Chambre to Moûtiers	W	road	1993	6509
Colle Checrouit	Courmayeur to the Lac de Combal	MB	bridle path	1,960	6,431
Col de Voza	Chamonix to Les Contamines	MB	bridle path	1,675	5,496
Col de la Forclaz (F)	Chamonix to Saint-Gervais	MB	bridle path	1,556	5,105
Col de la Forclaz (CH)	Argentière to Martigny	MB	road	1,520	4,987

== Nature conservation ==
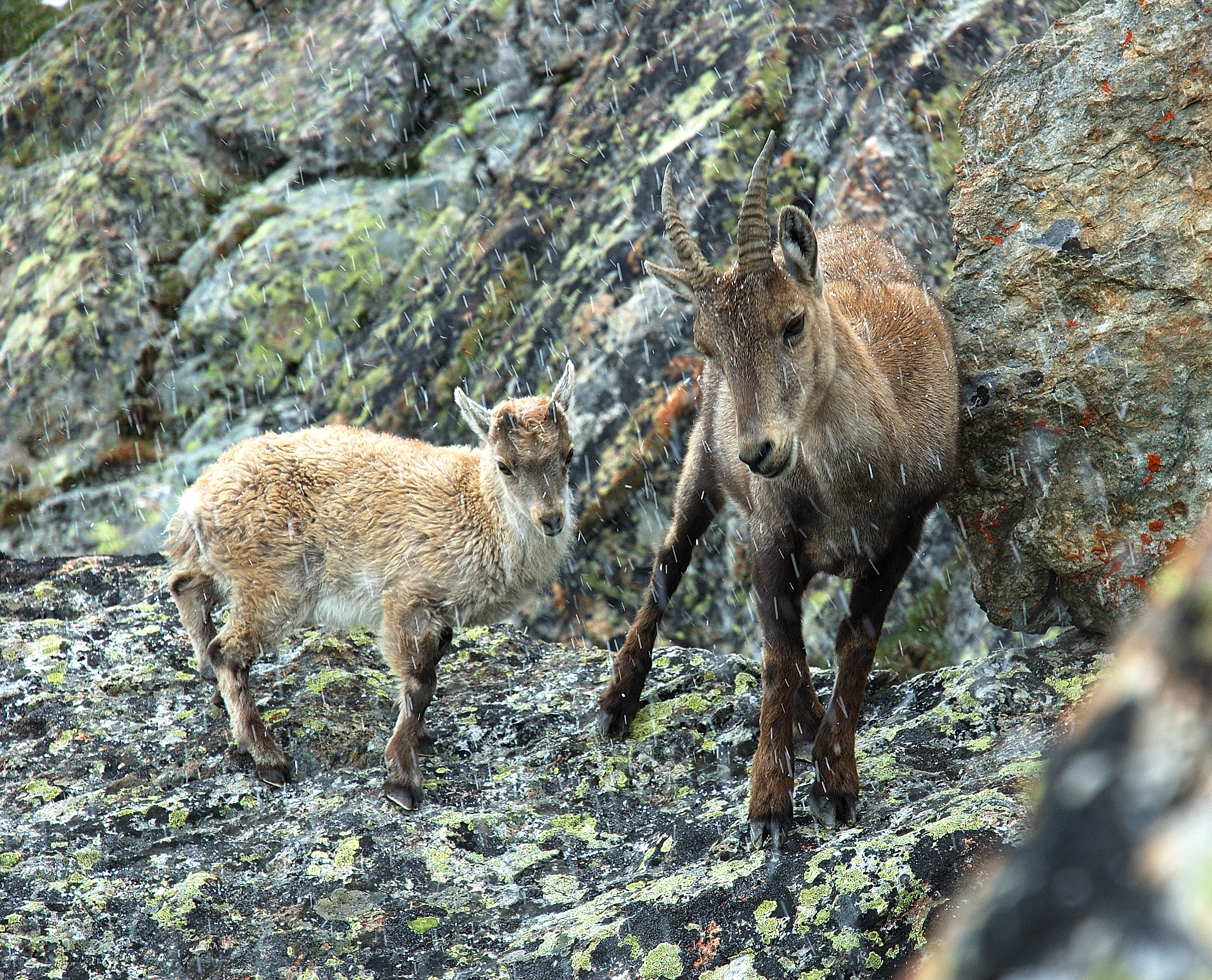
Alpine ibex.

The western group contains the Vanoise National Park, established in 1972 and covering 1,250 km^{2} (480 sq mi) the eastern group contains the Gran Paradiso National Park, the oldest Italian national park. Also on the Italian side is located the Parco Regionale del Monte Avic, a nature park of 5,747 ha established by Regione Valle d'Aosta.

== Maps ==
- Italian official cartography (Istituto Geografico Militare - IGM); on-line version: www.pcn.minambiente.it
- French official cartography (Institut Géographique National - IGN); on-line version: www.geoportail.fr
- Swiss official cartography (Swiss Federal Office of Topography - Swisstopo); on-line version: map.geo.admin.ch

== See also ==
- Mont Blanc Massif
- Vanoise Massif
- Swiss Alps
- Mares Peak
- Uja di Calcante
