= Punta Leynir =

Mountain in Italy

- French: Pointe du Leynir
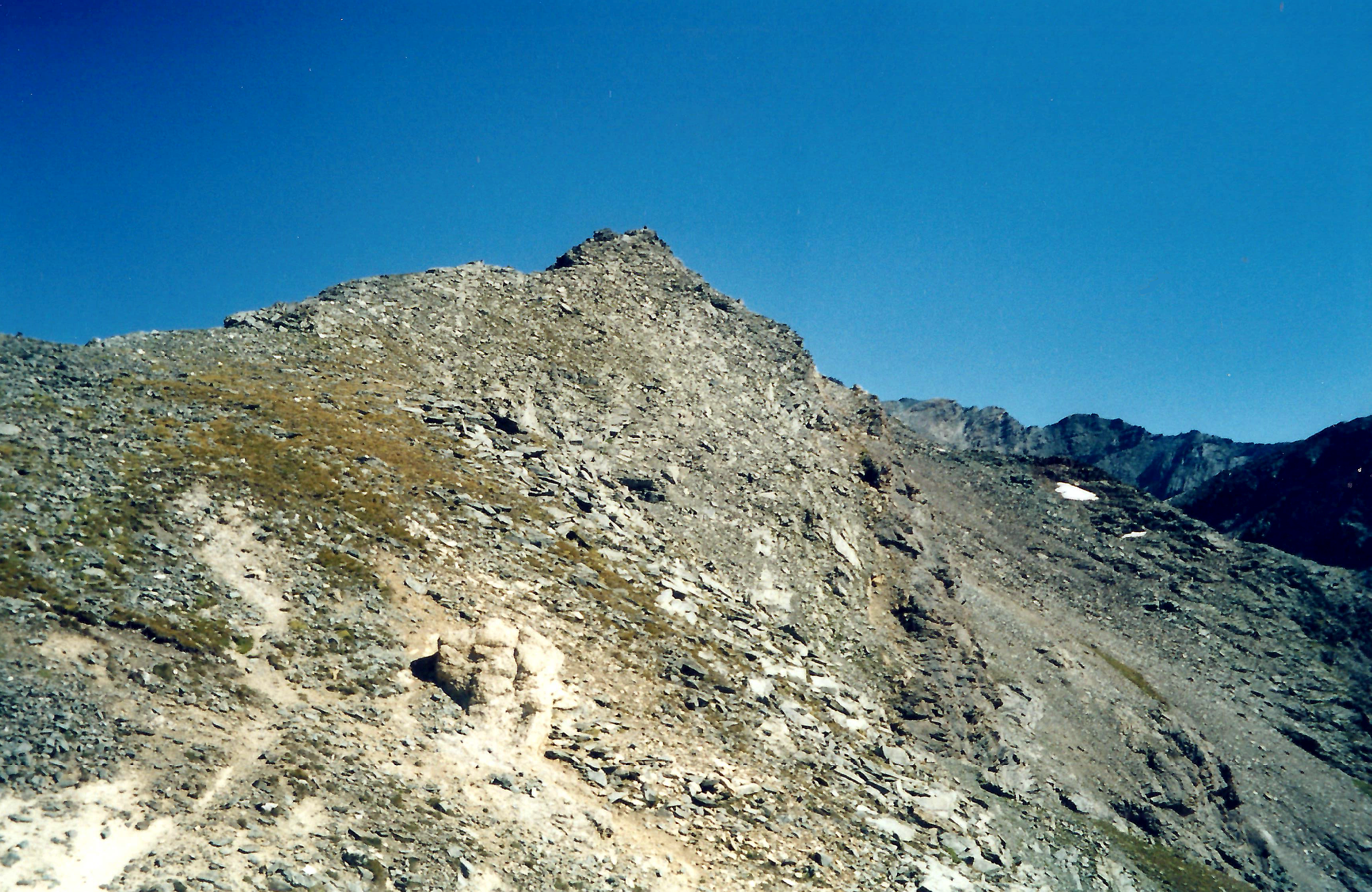
- Punta Leynir from Col Rosset

Highest point
- Elevation: 3,238 m (10,623 ft)
- Prominence: 151 m (495 ft)
- Isolation: 0.62 km (0.39 mi)
- Coordinates: 45°30′58″N 7°08′15″E

Geography
- Location within Alps
- Location: Piedmont/Aosta Valley, Italy
- Parent range: Graian Alps

Climbing
- Easiest route: Hike

The Punta Leynir (Pointe du Leynir in French) is a 3,238 metres high mountain belonging to the Italian side of Graian Alps.

== Toponymy ==
The name Leynir comes from the Franco-Provençal for "black lake", referring to the color of a small lake located SE of the mountain. The name Punta del Leynir was adopted by the old maps of IGM. Giovanni Bobba and Luigi Vaccarone in their Guida delle Alpi Occidentali (Guide book to Western Alps) named the mountain Punta Vaudaletta, while in the technical map of the autonomous region Aosta Valley its name is Pointe du Leynir.

== Geography ==
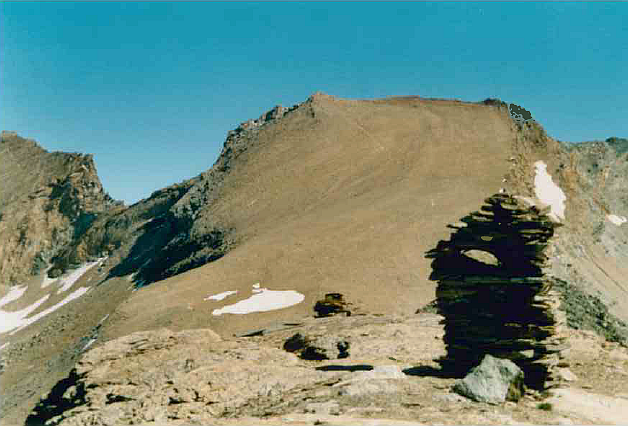
Summit cairn and, in the background, the Mont Tout Blanc.

The mountain is located on the border between Piedmont and Aosta Valley and its summit is the tripoint where the Orco Valley meets the Valsavarenche and the Rhêmes valleys, both tributaries of Dora Baltea. The Leynir Pass (3,084 m, NE of the summit) divides the mountain from the Mont Tout Blanc, while the Orco/Valsavarenche ridge continues towards SW with Col Rosset (3,023 m) and Pointe Rosset (3,100 m). From the Punta Leynir originates the Orco/Rhêmes ridge, heading SE. After a saddle at 3,112 m it rises to the neighbouring Punta Bes (3,177 m) and then it goes down reaching the Nivolet Pass. The summit of Punta Leynir is flanked from SW by a subsummit, divided from the main summit by a 350-m stretch of ridge, not difficult to traverse. The mountain, due to its location, offers a very good view on the nearby massif of Gran Paradiso.

=== SOIUSA classification ===
According to SOIUSA (International Standardized Mountain Subdivision of the Alps) the mountain can be classified in the following way:

- main part = Western Alps
- major sector = North Western Alps
- section = Graian Alps
- subsection = Central Graian Alps
- supergroup = Grande Sassière-Tsanteleina ridge
- group = Galisia-Entrelor-Bioula
- code = I/B-7.III-A.1

== Access to the summit ==
The mountain can be accessed from the Nivolet Pass (2.641 m); this route requires a good hiking experience. Along with Punta Leynir some hikers also climb the nearby Punta Bes. For ski mountaineers, who also usually start from the Nivolet Pass, the level of difficulty is considered BS (Good Skiers).

== Mountain huts ==
- Refuge città di Chivasso (2,604 m).
- Rifugio Albergo Savoia (2,534 m).

== Nature protection ==
Punta Leynir belongs to the Gran Paradiso National Park.

== Maps ==
- Istituto Geografico Militare (IGM) official maps of Italy, 1:25.000 and 1:100.000 scale, on-line version
- Carta dei sentieri e dei rifugi scala 1:50.000 n. 3 Il Parco Nazionale del Gran Paradiso, Istituto Geografico Centrale - Torino
