= Orco Valley =

Valley in the Piedmont region of northern Italy

- Valle Locana or Valle di Ceresole
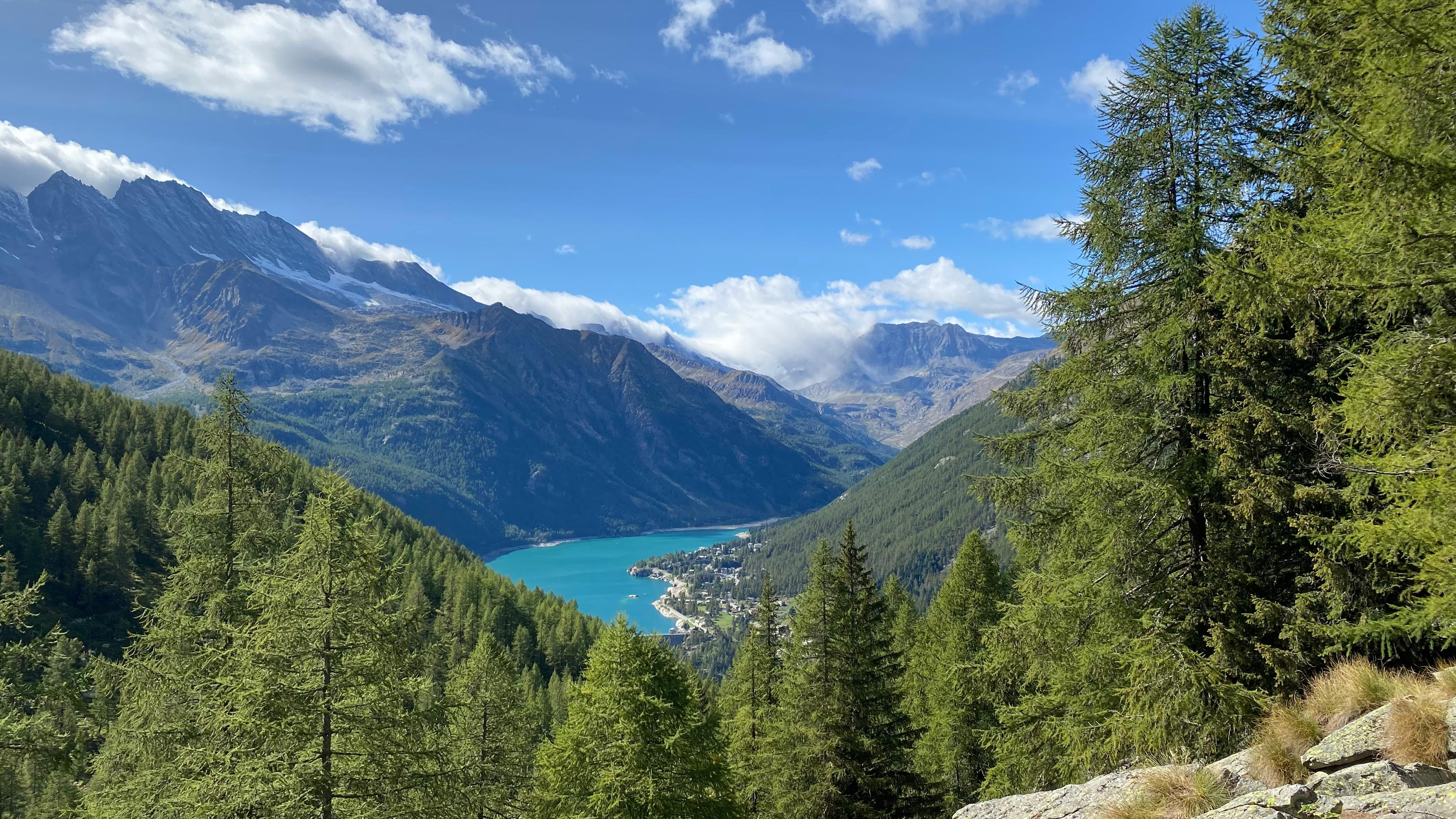
- Panorama of the valley from La Cialma (Locana)

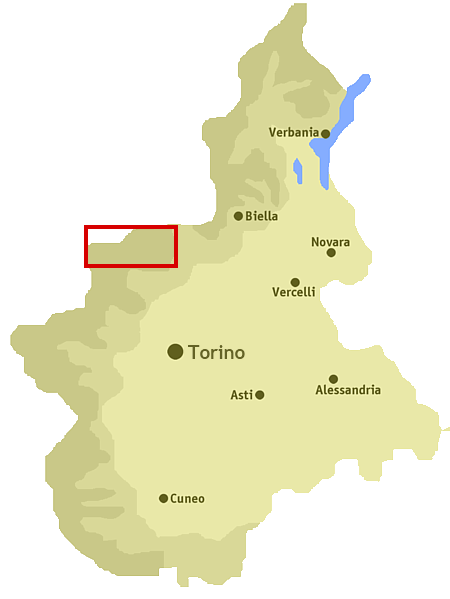
- Location of the valley in Piedmont, northern Italy
- Floor elevation: 300–4,061 m (984–13,323 ft)
- Length: around 50 km (31 mi) west east

Geology
- Type: Glacial valley

Geography
- Location: Piedmont, Italy
- Population centers: Alpette, Ceresole Reale, Locana, Noasca, Pont Canavese, Ribordone, Sparone, Cuorgnè
- Coordinates: 45°25′01″N 7°28′01″E

The Orco Valley (Italian: Valle dell'Orco) is a valley in the Piedmont region of northern Italy located in the Graian Alps, in the territory of the Metropolitan City of Turin. The valley takes its name from the Orco river, which flows through the valley.

The valley connects Pont Canavese to the Nivolet Pass. It is the site of a series of hydroelectric power plants, including that of the Lake of Ceresole.

The main municipalities in the Orco Valley are Locana, Noasca and Ceresole Reale.

== Summits ==
Summits in the valley include:

- Gran Paradiso (4,061 m)
- Torre del Gran San Pietro (3,692 m)
- Ciarforon (3,642 m)
- Levanna Centrale (3,619 m)
- Punta di Galisia (3,345 m)
- Torre di Lavina (3,308 m)
- Punta Leynir (3,238 m)
- Punta Bes (3,177 m)

== Nature protection ==
A large part of the north side of the valley belongs to the Parco Nazionale del Gran Paradiso.
