= Grivola =

Mountain in the Graian Alps in Italy

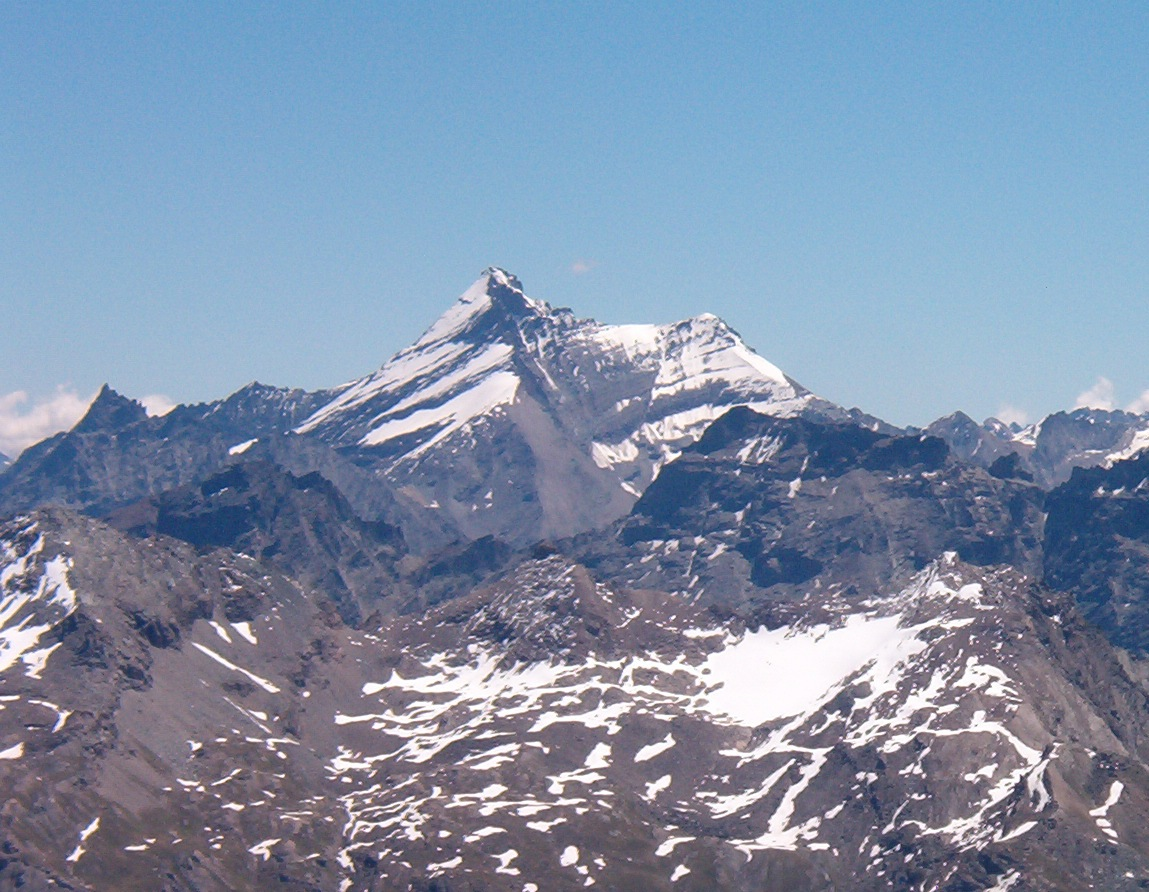
- The Grivola

Highest point
- Elevation: 3,969 m (13,022 ft)
- Prominence: 714 m (2,343 ft)
- Isolation: 8.54 km (5.31 mi)
- Listing: Alpine mountains above 3000 m
- Coordinates: 45°35′48″N 7°15′52″E

Geography
- Location within Italy
- Location: Aosta Valley, Italy
- Parent range: Graian Alps

Climbing
- First ascent: 1859 by Ormsby, Bruce, Fidèle-Ambroise Dayné, Cachat and Tairraz
- Easiest route: From Col du Lauson (3,296 m)

The Grivola (IPA [gʁivola]; 3,969 m) is a mountain in the Graian Alps in Italy. It lies between the Valsavarenche and the Cogne Valley.

== Etymology ==
Grivola was named in different ways in the past:

- Pic de Cogne
- Grivolet
- Bec de Grivola
- Aiguille de Grivola

"Grivola" firstly appeared in 1845. Giuseppe Giacosa says it comes from Valdôtain griva, meaning song thrush (French: grive). Joseph-Marie Henry indicated grivoline (French: grivoise), a pretty young girl, as for Jungfrau. Paul-Louis Rousset says that the origin is gri in Valgrisenche Valdôtain, meaning "loose stones".

== SOIUSA classification ==
According to SOIUSA (International Standardized Mountain Subdivision of the Alps) the mountain is classified in the following way:

- main part = Western Alps
- major sector = North-Western Alps
- section = Graian Alps
- subsection = North-eastern Graian Alps
- supergroup = Catena del Gran Paradiso
- group = Gruppo Grivola-Gran Serra
- subgroup = Sottogruppo della Grivola
- code = I/B-7.IV-A.3.b

== Huts ==
- Rifugio Federico Chabod (2,750 m)
- Bivacco Luciano Gratton (3,198 m)
- Bivacco Mario Balzola (3,477 m)
- Bivacco Mario Gontier (2,309 m)
- Rifugio Vittorio Emanuele II (2,732 m)
- Rifugio Vittorio Sella (2,588 m)

== See also ==
- List of mountains of the Alps above 3000 m

== Maps ==
- Italian official cartography (Istituto Geografico Militare - IGM); on-line version: www.pcn.minambiente.it
- I.G.C. (Istituto Geografico Centrale) - Carta dei sentieri e dei rifugi 1:50.000 scale n.3 Parco Nazionale del Gran Paradiso and 1:25.000 n.101 Gran Paradiso, La Grivola, Cogne
