= Punta Bes =

Mountain in Italy

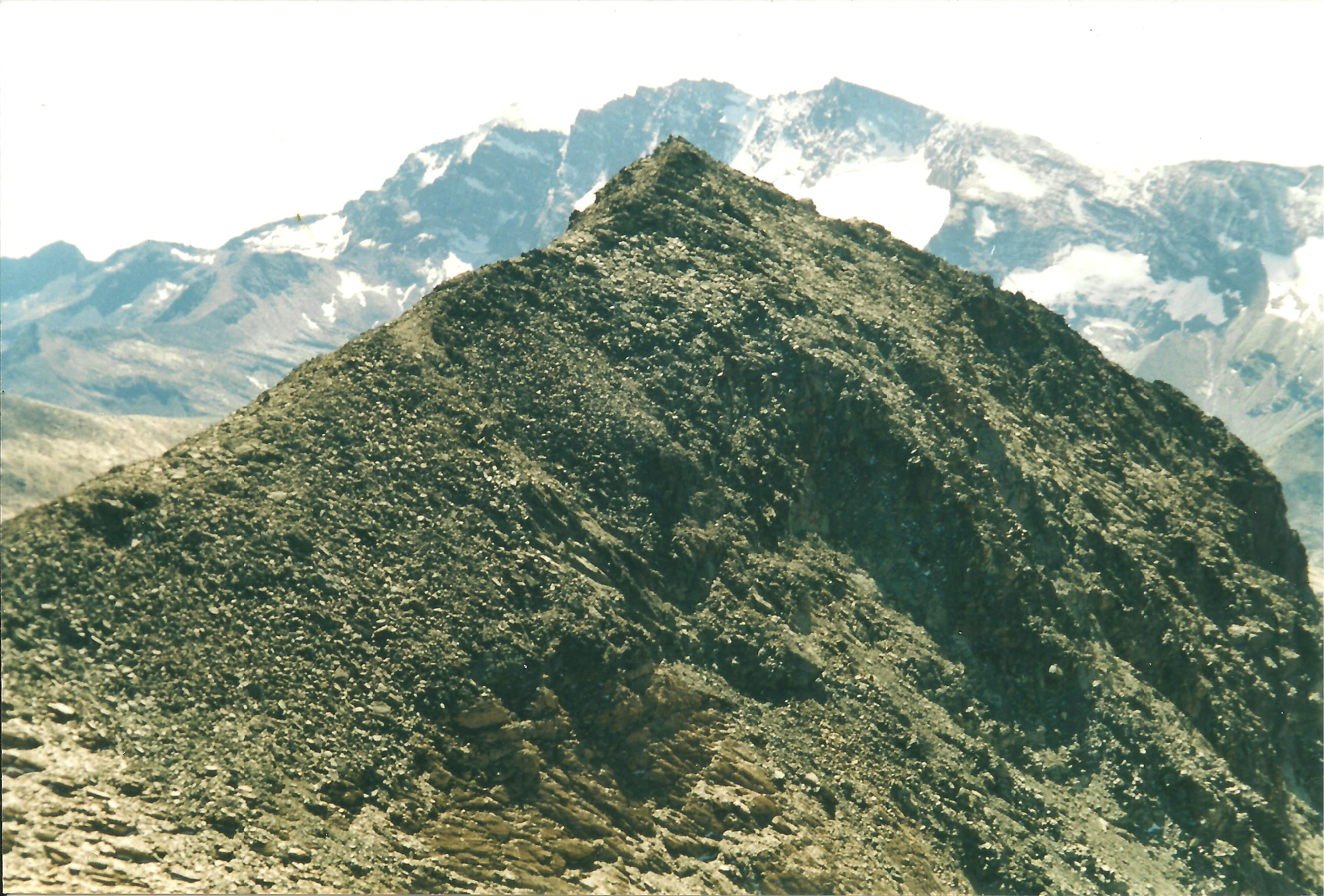
- Punta Bes from Punta Leynir

Highest point
- Elevation: 3,177 m (10,423 ft)
- Prominence: 65 m (213 ft)
- Parent peak: Punta Leynir
- Coordinates: 45°30′43″N 7°08′16″E

Geography
- Location within Alps
- Location: Piedmont/Aosta Valley, Italy
- Parent range: Graian Alps

Climbing
- Easiest route: scrambling

The Punta Bes is a 3,177 metres high mountain belonging to the Italian side of Graian Alps.

== Geography ==
The mountain is located on the border between Piedmont and Aosta Valley, on the watershed dividing Valle dell'Orco from Valsavarenche, the latter tributary of the Dora Baltea. A 3.112 m high saddle divides Punta bes from Punta Leynir, while the Orco/Valsavarenche ridge continues towards the Colle del Nivolet. The Punta Bes, due to its location, offers a good view on the nearby Gran Paradiso Massif.

=== SOIUSA classification ===
According to SOIUSA (International Standardized Mountain Subdivision of the Alps) the mountain can be classified in the following way:

- main part = Western Alps
- major sector = North Western Alps
- section = Graian Alps
- subsection = Central Graian Alps
- supergroup = Catena Grande Sassière-Tsanteleina
- group = Costiera Galisia-Entrelor-Bioula
- code = I/B-7.III-A.1

== Access to the summit ==
The mountain can be accessed from Nivolet Pass (2.641 m); this route requires a good hiking experience. Along with Punta Bes many hikers also climb the nearby Punta Leynir.

== Mountain huts ==
- Refuge Città di Chivasso (2,604 m).
- Rifugio Albergo Savoia (2,534 m).

== Nature protection ==
Punta Bes belongs to the Parco Nazionale del Gran Paradiso.

== Maps ==
- Istituto Geografico Militare (IGM) official maps of Italy, 1:25.000 and 1:100.000 scale, on-line version
- Carta dei sentieri e dei rifugi scala 1:50.000 n. 3 Il Parco Nazionale del Gran Paradiso, Istituto Geografico Centrale - Torino
