= Ciarforon =

Mountain in Italy

Ciarforon Charforon
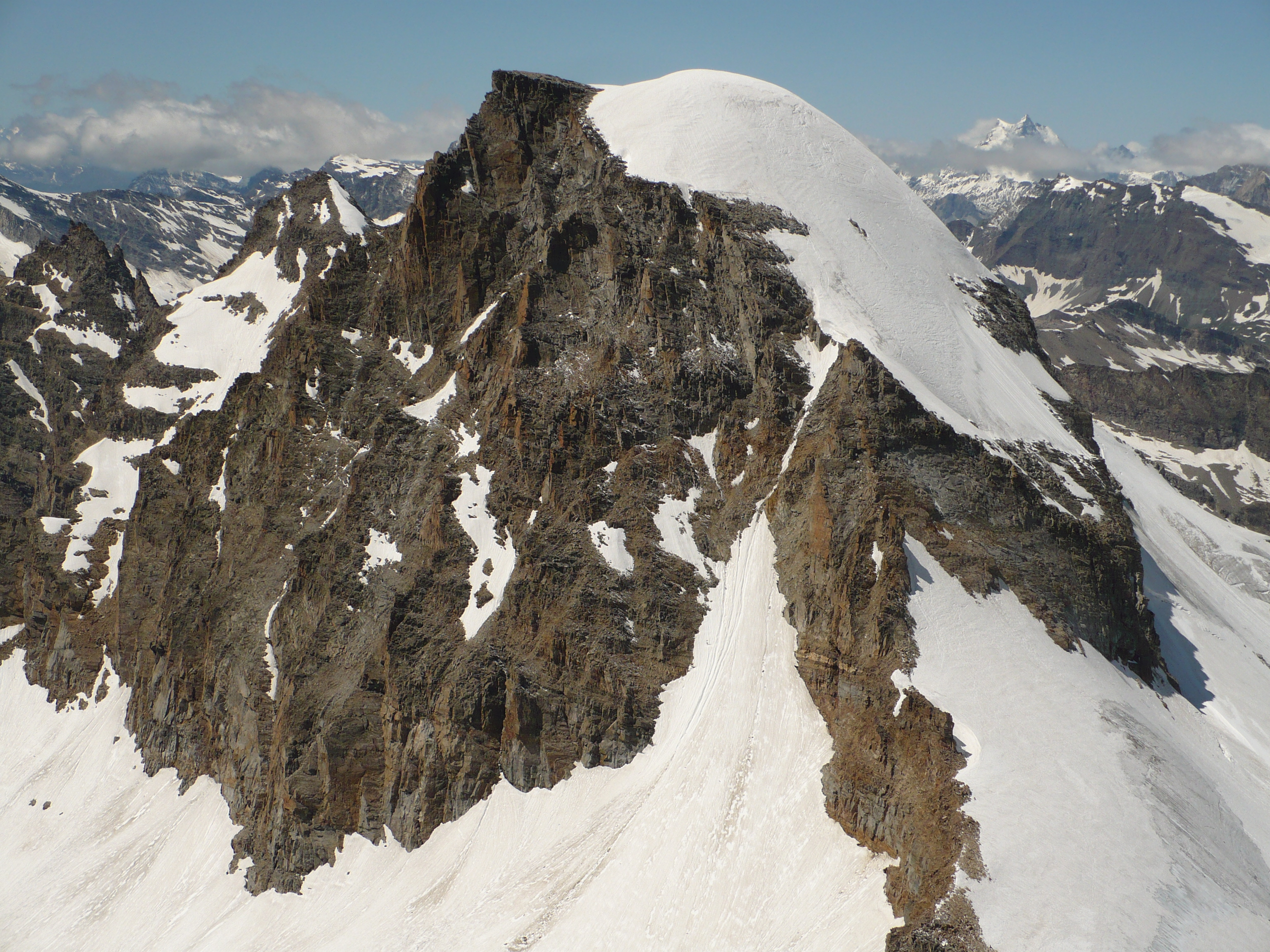

Highest point
- Elevation: 3,642 m (11,949 ft)
- Prominence: 341
- Listing: Alpine mountains above 3000 m
- Coordinates: 45°29′40″N 7°14′48″E

Geography
- Location within Alps
- Location: Aosta Valley and Piedmont, Italy
- Parent range: Graian Alps

Ciarforon, or Charforon (3,642m), is a mountain in the Gran Paradiso Massif of the Graian Alps on the border of Aosta Valley and Piedmont, Italy.

== Location ==
Ciarforon lies south of Gran Paradiso, on the watershed between Valsavarenche and the Orco Valley. It boasts a mighty dome-shaped summit and a huge ice sheet on its upper slopes. The mountain is glaciated on all four sides.

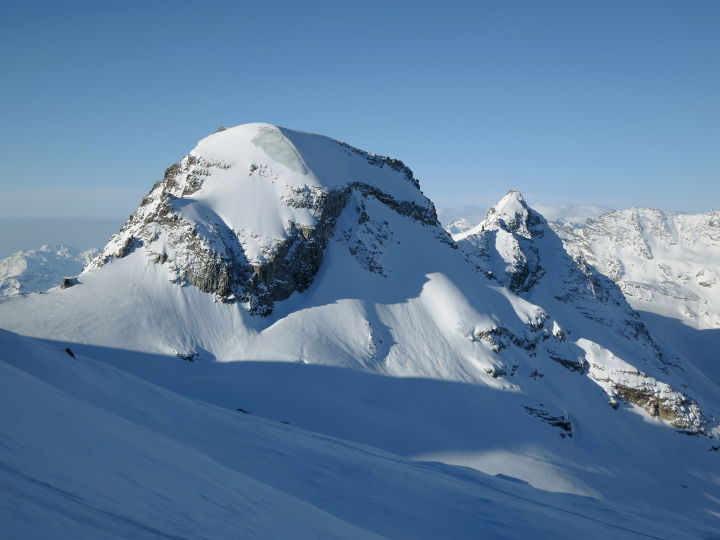
The domed summit of Ciarforon
