= Mont Tout Blanc =

Mountain in Italy

- Mont Taou Blanc, Mont Teu Blanc
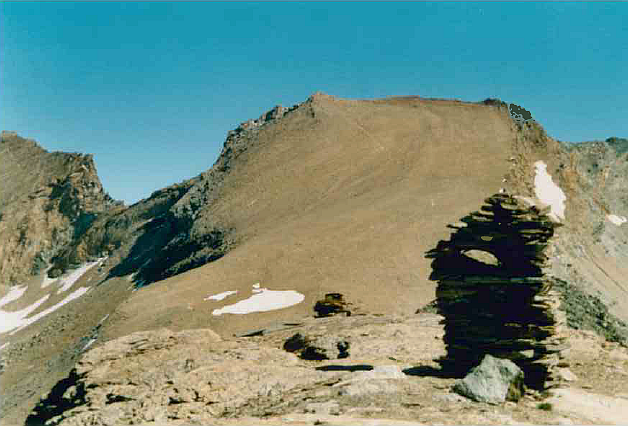
- Mont Tout Blanc from Punta Leynir

Highest point
- Elevation: 3,438 m (11,280 ft)
- Prominence: 111 m (364 ft)
- Isolation: 0.5 km (0.31 mi)
- Coordinates: 45°31′20″N 7°08′53″E

Geography
- Location within Alps
- Location: Aosta Valley, Italy
- Parent range: Graian Alps

Climbing
- Easiest route: Hike (scrambling)

The Mont Tout Blanc is a 3,438.2 metres high mountain belonging to the Italian side of Graian Alps.

== Toponymy ==
Tout Blanc in French means totally white, all-white. The mountain is also known as Mont Taou Blanc or Mont Teu Blanc.

== Geography ==
The Mont Tout Blanc is located on the ridge dividing the Valsavarenche valley (East of the mountain) from the Rhêmes valley (West), both on the right-hand side of the Aosta Valley. The Aouillé pass (Col de l'Aouillé) divides it from the neighbouring Pointe de l'Aouillé (3,445 m) while the Col Rosset divides the Taou Blanc from Punta Leynir.

=== SOIUSA classification ===
According to SOIUSA (International Standardized Mountain Subdivision of the Alps) the mountain can be classified in the following way:

- main part = Western Alps
- major sector = North Western Alps
- section = Graian Alps
- subsection = Central Graian Alps
- supergroup = Catena Grande Sassière-Tsanteleina
- group = Costiera Galisia-Entrelor-Bioula
- code = I/B-7.III-A.1

== Access to the summit ==
The mountain can be accessed from Nivolet Pass (2.641 m); this route requires a good hiking experience, although is sometimes considered an alpinistic route of F+ level. The top of the Taou Balnc offers a good point of view on Gran Paradiso Massif.

=== Mountain huts ===
- Refuge città di Chivasso (2,604 m).

== Nature protection ==
The Mont Tout Blanc belongs to the Gran Paradiso National Park.

== Maps ==
- Istituto Geografico Militare (IGM) official maps of Italy, 1:25.000 and 1:100.000 scale, on-line version
- Carta dei sentieri e dei rifugi scala 1:50.000 n. 3 Il Parco Nazionale del Gran Paradiso, Istituto Geografico Centrale - Torino
