= Gran Paradiso Massif =

Massif in the Italian Alps

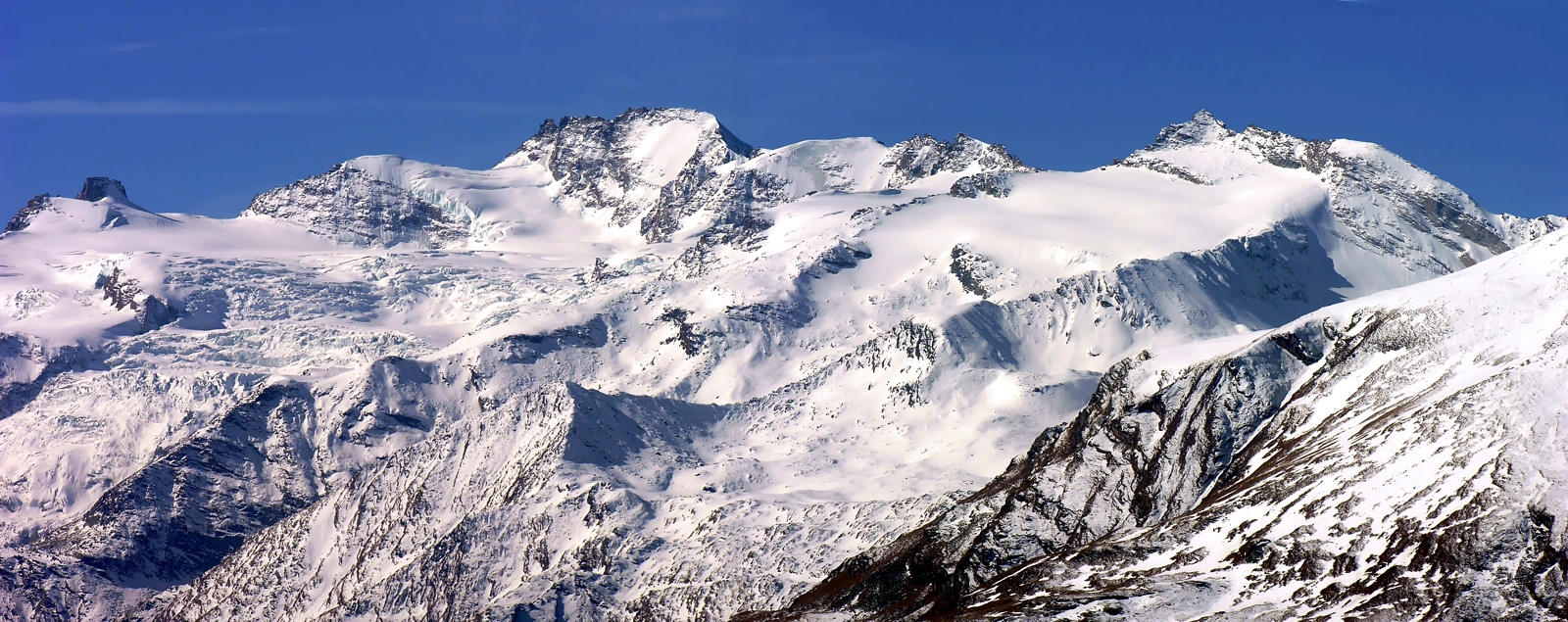
- Full view of the massif from the north side.

Highest point
- Elevation: 4,061 m (13,323 ft)
- Parent peak: Gran Paradiso
- Coordinates: 45°31′29″N 7°15′25″E

Naming
- Native name: Massiccio del Gran Paradiso (Italian); Massif du Grand-Paradis (French)

Geography
- The massif is at the northwestern corner of Italy, below the Dora Baltea river
- Country: Italy
- Region(s): Piedmont and Aosta Valley
- Parent range: Graian Alps

Geology
- Rock age: Permian

The Gran Paradiso Massif (Italian: Massiccio del Gran Paradiso; French: Massif du Grand-Paradis) is a massif in the Italian Alps, in the regions of Aosta Valley and Piedmont.

The Gran Paradiso National Park covers approximately the western half of the massif, while the Mont Avic Natural Park covers the Champdepraz valley.

== Geography ==
=== Location ===
The massif is limited to the west and south (Orco) by the Graian Alps, and to the north (Dora Baltea) by the Pennine Alps.

=== Main summits ===
- Gran Paradiso, 4,061 m (13,323 ft)
- Grivola, 3,969 m (13,022 ft)
- Piccolo Paradiso, 3,923 m (12,871 ft)
- Becca di Montandayné, 3,838 m (12,592 ft)
- Pointe de la Lune, 3,777 m (12,392 ft)
- Herbétet, 3,778 m (12,395 ft)
- Torre del Gran San Pietro, 3,692 m (12,113 ft)
- Roccia Viva, 3,650 m (11,980 ft)
- Testa della Tribolazione, 3,642 m (11,949 ft)
- Ciarforon, 3,640 m (11,940 ft)
- Punta Rossa della Grivola, 3,630 m (11,910 ft)
- Becca di Gay, 3,621 m (11,880 ft)
- Tresenta, 3,609 m (11,841 ft)
- Monte Emilius, 3,559 m (11,677 ft)
- Gran Serra, 3,552 m (11,654 ft)
- Becca di Monciair, 3,544 m (11,627 ft)
- Punta Tersiva, 3,512 m (11,522 ft)
- Pointe Ondezana, 3,490 m (11,450 ft)
- Grand Nomenon, 3,488 m (11,444 ft)
- Denti del Broglio, 3,454 m (11,332 ft)
- Punta Garin, 3,448 m (11,312 ft)
- Pointe Cissetta, 3,419 m (11,217 ft)
- Punta Fourà, 3,411 m (11,191 ft)
- Pointe des Seinges, 3,408 m (11,181 ft)

== Geology ==
The massif is made up mainly of crystalline rocks and schists.
