= Herbétet =

Mountain in Italy

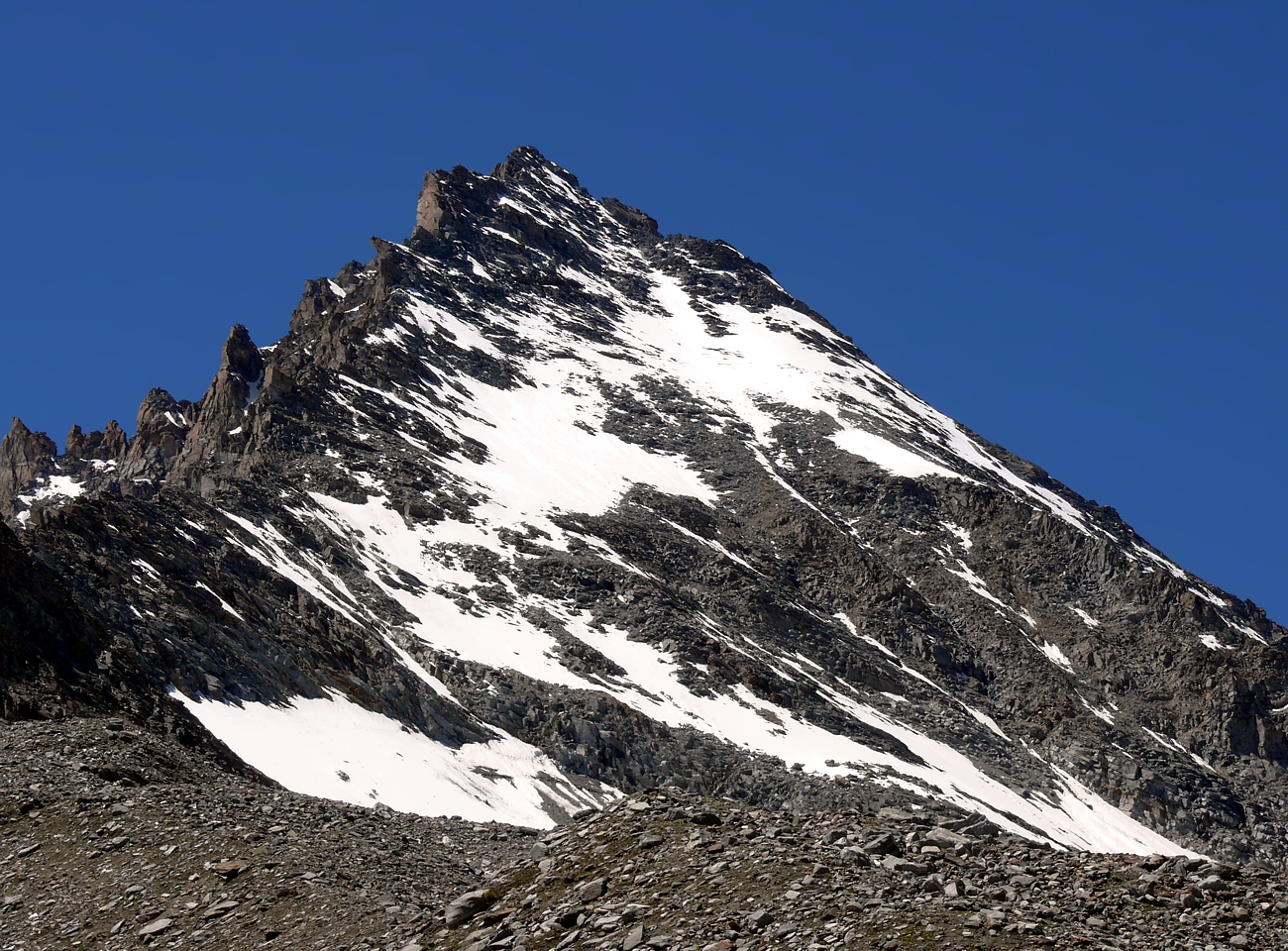
- The north eastern side of the mountain.

Highest point
- Elevation: 3,778 m (12,395 ft)
- Coordinates: 45°32′44″N 07°16′24″E

Geography
- Location within Alps
- Location: Aosta Valley, Italy
- Parent range: Graian Alps

Herbétet is a mountain in the Gran Paradiso Massif, a sub-group of the Graian Alps, with an elevation of 3,778 metres (12,395 ft). It is located between the Cogne Valley and the Valsavarenche Valley.

== Maps ==
- Italian official cartography (Istituto Geografico Militare - IGM); on-line version: www.pcn.minambiente.it
- Istituto Geografico Centrale - Carta dei sentieri e dei rifugi 1:50.000 scale n.3 Parco Nazionale del Gran Paradiso and 1:25.000 n.101 Gran Paradiso, La Grivola, Cogne
