= Punta Lavina =

Mountain in Italy

Punta Lavina Tour de Lavina
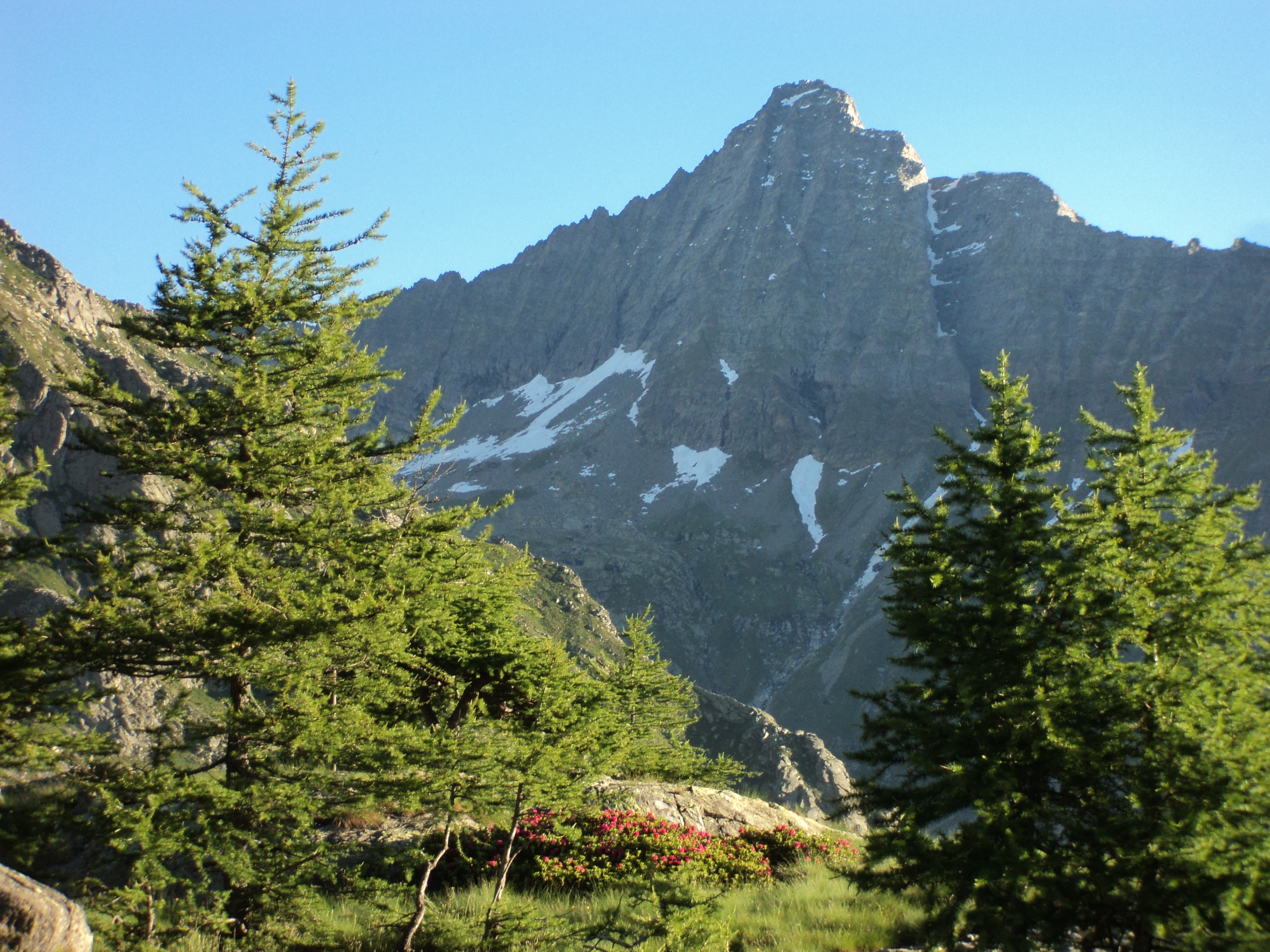
- Torre di Lavina

Highest point
- Elevation: 3,308 m (10,853 ft)
- Prominence: 485 m (1,591 ft)
- Listing: Alpine mountains above 3000 m
- Coordinates: 45°33′23″N 7°26′52″E

Geography
- Location within Alps
- Location: Aosta Valley and Piedmont, Italy
- Parent range: Graian Alps

Punta Lavina (French: Tour de Lavina - sometimes referred to as Torre di Lavina in Italian) (3,308m) is a mountain of the Graian Alps located on the border of Aosta Valley and Piedmont, Italy. It is located between the Aostan Cogne Valley in the north and the Piedmontese Soana Valley in the South. The mountain has an elegant pyramidal shape which is easily recognisable from both Canavese and Turin. It lies entirely within the Gran Paradiso National Park.
