= Vittorio Emanuele II Hut =

Mountain hut in Italy

Coordinates: 45°30′45″N 7°13′46″E

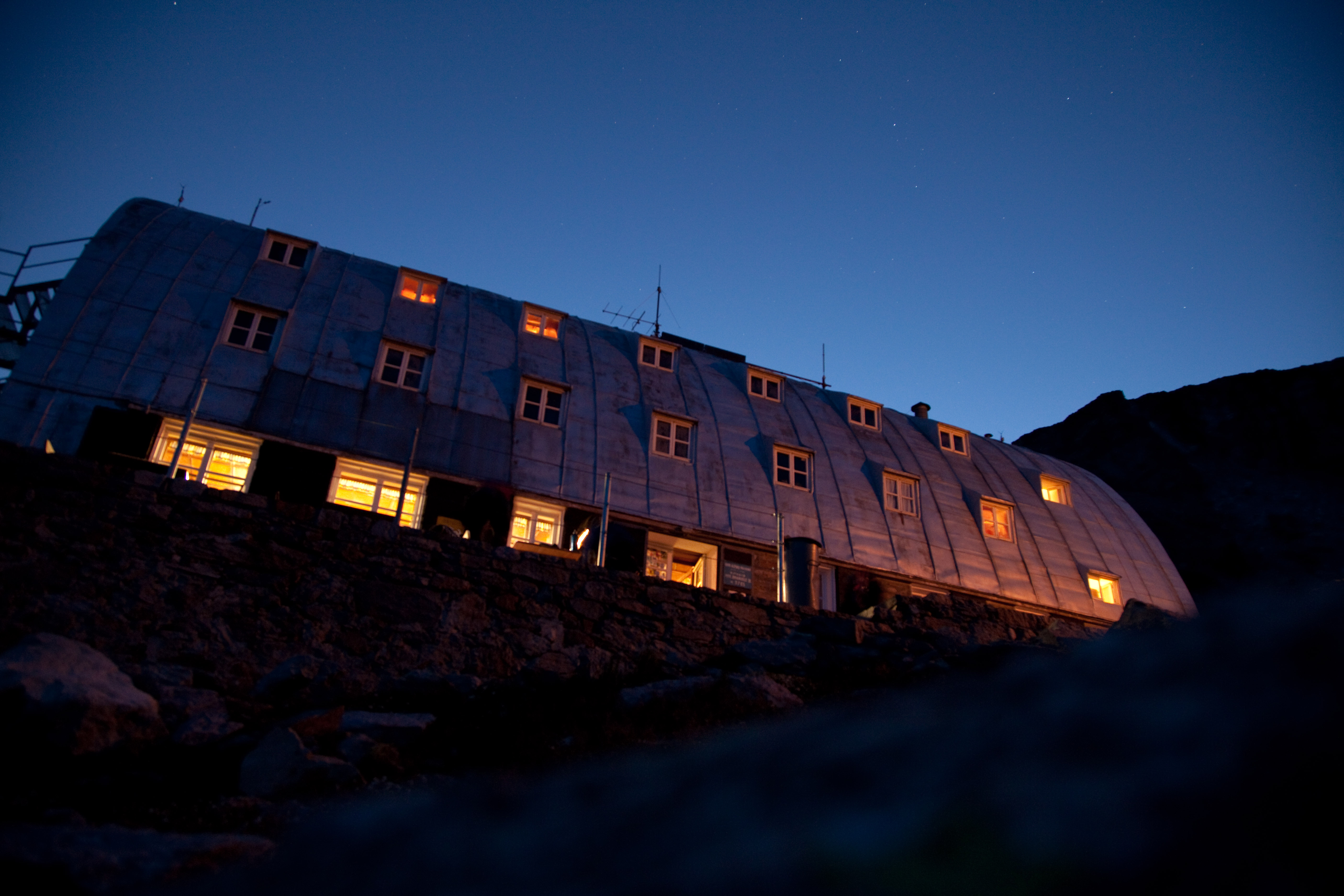
Refuge Victor-Emmanuel II, early morning

Vittorio Emanuele II Hut (Italian: Rifugio Vittorio Emanuele II; French: Refuge Victor-Emmanuel II) is a mountain hut in the Alps in Aosta Valley, Italy. It was named after King Victor Emmanuel II who established it as part of a hunting path and conservation area.

== Background ==
The Gran Paradiso area where the hut would be built was designated as a Royal hunting reserve by the King of Italy, King Victor Emmanuel II in 1856 in order to act as a conservation area to protect the alpine ibex. The Vittorio Emanuele II Hut was first constructed in 1884. It was built upon hunting paths used by King Vittorio Emanuele II. By 1893, it had gained an international reputation as one of the finer club huts in the Western Alps and had been nicknamed "The Palace" by English-speaking guidebooks. After the First World War, King Victor Emmanuel III established a royal commission on the Gran Paradiso National Park which rebuilt the hut and allowed for additional ancillary buildings to be constructed around it in order to promote tourism to the area, including allowing tourists to stay overnight in the former hunting wardens huts nearby. In 1934, it was planned to be rebuilt again by the Italian architect Armando Melis De Villa. The completion date was scheduled for 1943 but due to the Second World War when work stopped completely, the completion of the project was delayed until 1961.

A Roman Catholic chapel was later established nearby dedicated to the Virgin Mary and was consecrated in 1968 by Bishop Maturino Blanchet, Bishop of Aosta. It was expanded further in 2004 to add more rooms for the serving staff and to install fire escapes. During the COVID-19 pandemic in Italy, the Vittorio Emanuele II Hut reduced capacity by over 50% due to a lack of tourists outside of regular French and German climbers.
