= Rhêmes-Notre-Dame =

Rhêmes-Notre-Dame Noutre Dame de Réma (Valdôtain)
- Comune
- Comune di Rhêmes-Notre-Dame; Commune de Rhêmes-Notre-Dame
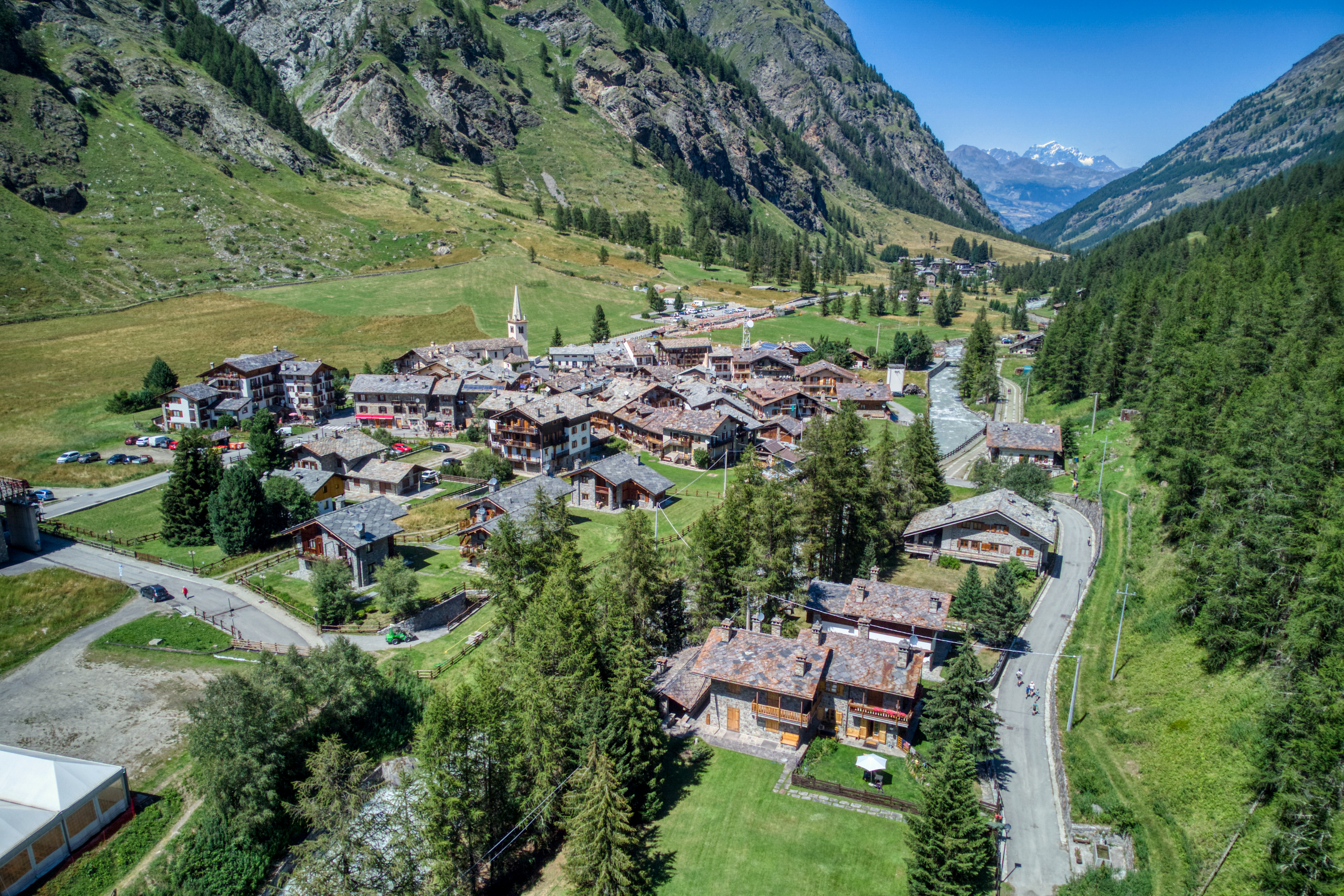
- The village of Bruil

- Location within Italy Location within Aosta Valley
- Coordinates: 45°34′11.17″N 7°7′5.16″E
- Country: Italy
- Region: Aosta Valley
- Province: none
- Frazioni: Artalle, Brenand, Broillat, Bruil, Carré, Chanavey, Chaudanne, Les Oreillers, Glairs, Pessey, Pellaud, Pont, Thumel

Government
  - Mayor: Corrado Oreiller

Area
  - Total: 86.84 km^{2} (33.53 sq mi)
- Elevation: 1,725 m (5,659 ft)

Population (2026)
  - Total: 74
  - Density: 0.85/km^{2} (2.2/sq mi)
- Demonym: Rhêmeins
- Time zone: UTC+1 (CET)
  - Summer (DST): UTC+2 (CEST)
- Postal code: 11010
- Dialing code: 0165
- Saint day: 2 July
- Website: Official website

Rhêmes-Notre-Dame (French: [ʁɛm nɔtʁə dam]; Valdôtain: Noutra Dama de Réma) is a comune (municipality) in the autonomous region of the Aosta Valley in Italy. With a population of 74, it is the least populous municipality in the Aosta Valley and the 2nd least densely populated in Italy.

== Geography ==
Rhêmes-Notre-Dame is a mountain municipality located in the upper Rhêmes valley. It is part of Gran Paradiso National Park. It is surrounded by mountains and glaciers. Despite the presence of some hotels and downhill slopes it still is a natural place with a rural architectural structure.

=== Climate ===
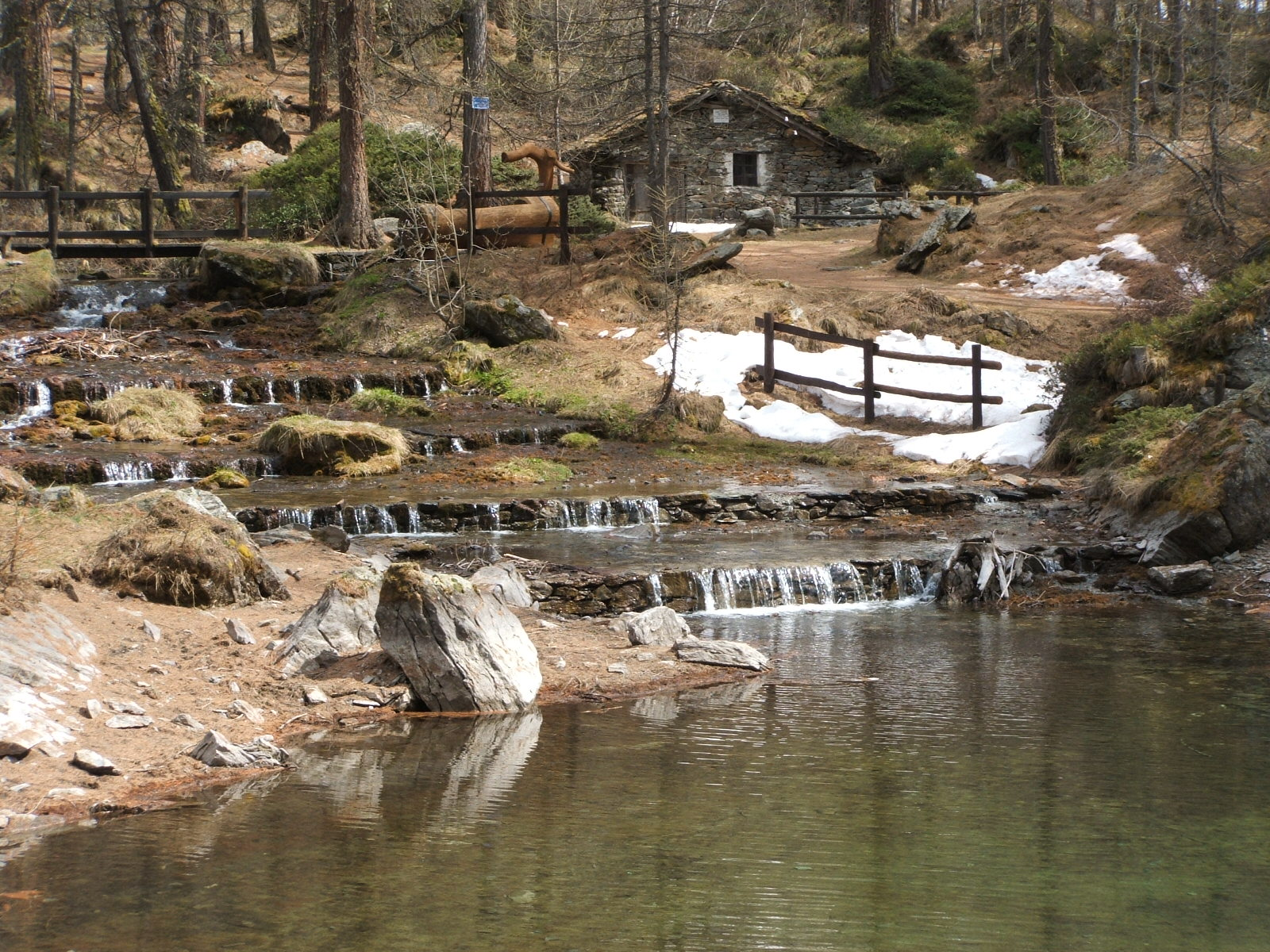
The Pellaud lake.

Because of its altitude, winters are cold and snowy, while summers are fresh. Temperatures vary from a minimum value of −15 °C (5 °F) during winters to a maximum value of 22 to 23 °C (72 to 73 °F) during summers.

== Demographics ==
As of 2026, the population is 74, of which 54.1% are male, and 45.9% are female. Minors make up 2.7% of the population, and seniors make up 31.1%.

Historical population

Year	Pop.	±%
1861	344	—
1871	298	−13.4%
1881	228	−23.5%
1901	226	−0.9%
1911	205	−9.3%
1921	177	−13.7%
1931	133	−24.9%
1936	129	−3.0%

Year	Pop.	±%
1951	123	−4.7%
1961	90	−26.8%
1971	99	+10.0%
1981	90	−9.1%
1991	92	+2.2%
2001	112	+21.7%
2011	114	+1.8%
2021	81	−28.9%

Source: ISTAT

=== Immigration ===
As of 2025, immigrants make up 10.5% of the total population. The largest foreign country of origin is Albania, the others are Australia, the Dominican Republic, Peru, Romania, Senegal, and Switzerland.

== Economy ==
The economy of Rhêmes-Notre-Dame is based on skiing during winters and mountain biking and excursions during summers. However, there still are some agricultural activities like cattle breeding that characterized the past of this place.

== Twin towns - sister cities ==
- Solarolo, Italy, since 1999

== See also ==
- Mont Tout Blanc
