= Torre del Gran San Pietro =

Mountain in Italy

Torre del Gran San Pietro Tour du Grand-Saint-Pierre
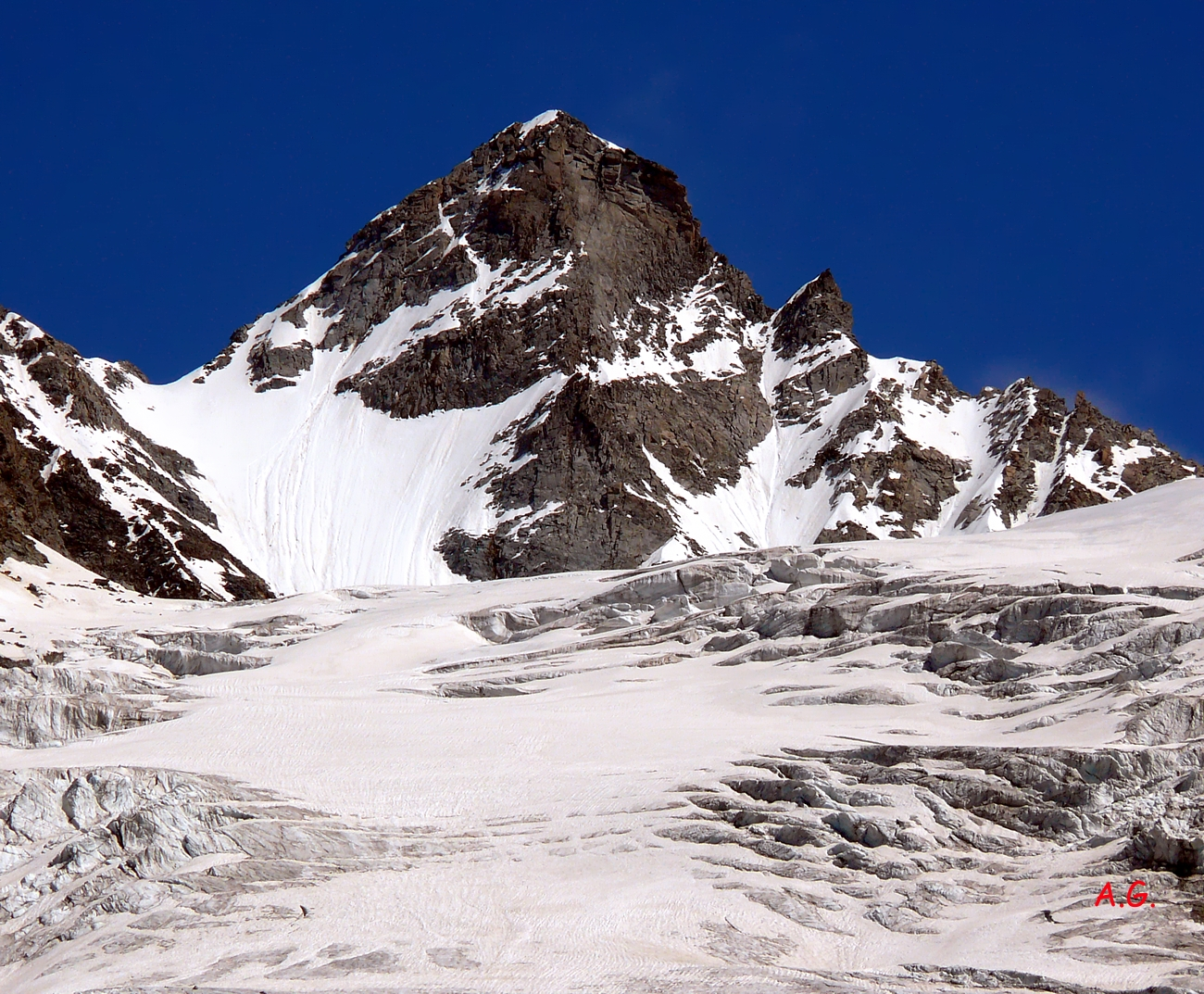
- Torre del Gran San Pietro over the Coupé de Money glacier

Highest point
- Elevation: 3,692 m (12,113 ft)
- Prominence: 332 m (1,089 ft)
- Isolation: 7.05 km (4.38 mi)
- Listing: Alpine mountains above 3000 m
- Coordinates: 45°31′36″N 07°21′29″E

Geography
- Location within Alps
- Location: Aosta Valley, Italy
- Parent range: Graian Alps

Climbing
- First ascent: 14 July 1867

Torre del Gran San Pietro (French: Tour du Grand-Saint-Pierre) is a mountain in the Gran Paradiso Massif, a sub-group of the Graian Alps, with an elevation of 3,692 m. It is located between Piedmont and Aosta Valley, in northern Italy, near the Cogne Valley.

== First ascent ==
In 1865 Amé Gorret, Martino Baretti, and Jean-Pierre Carrel reached a subsidiary summit on the crest of the mountain, which they subsequently dubbed Pic du Retour. Two years later, Daniel Ballay and Michel Payot guided Douglas Freshfield, C. C. Tucker, T. H. Carson, and J. H. Backhouse to the main summit.

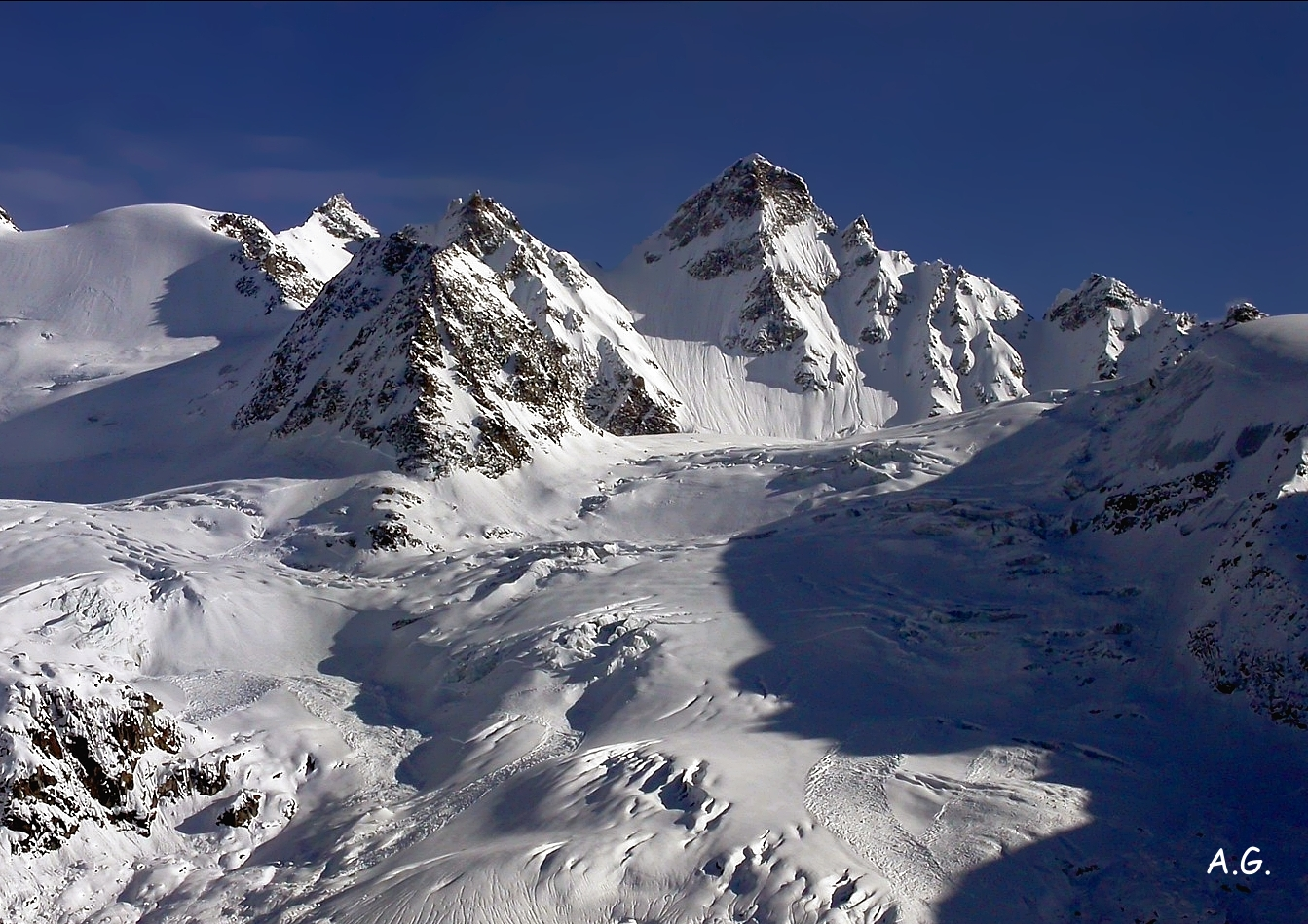

== See also ==
- List of mountains of the Alps
