= Punta Garin =

Mountain in Italy

Punta Garin Pic Garin / Pointe Garin
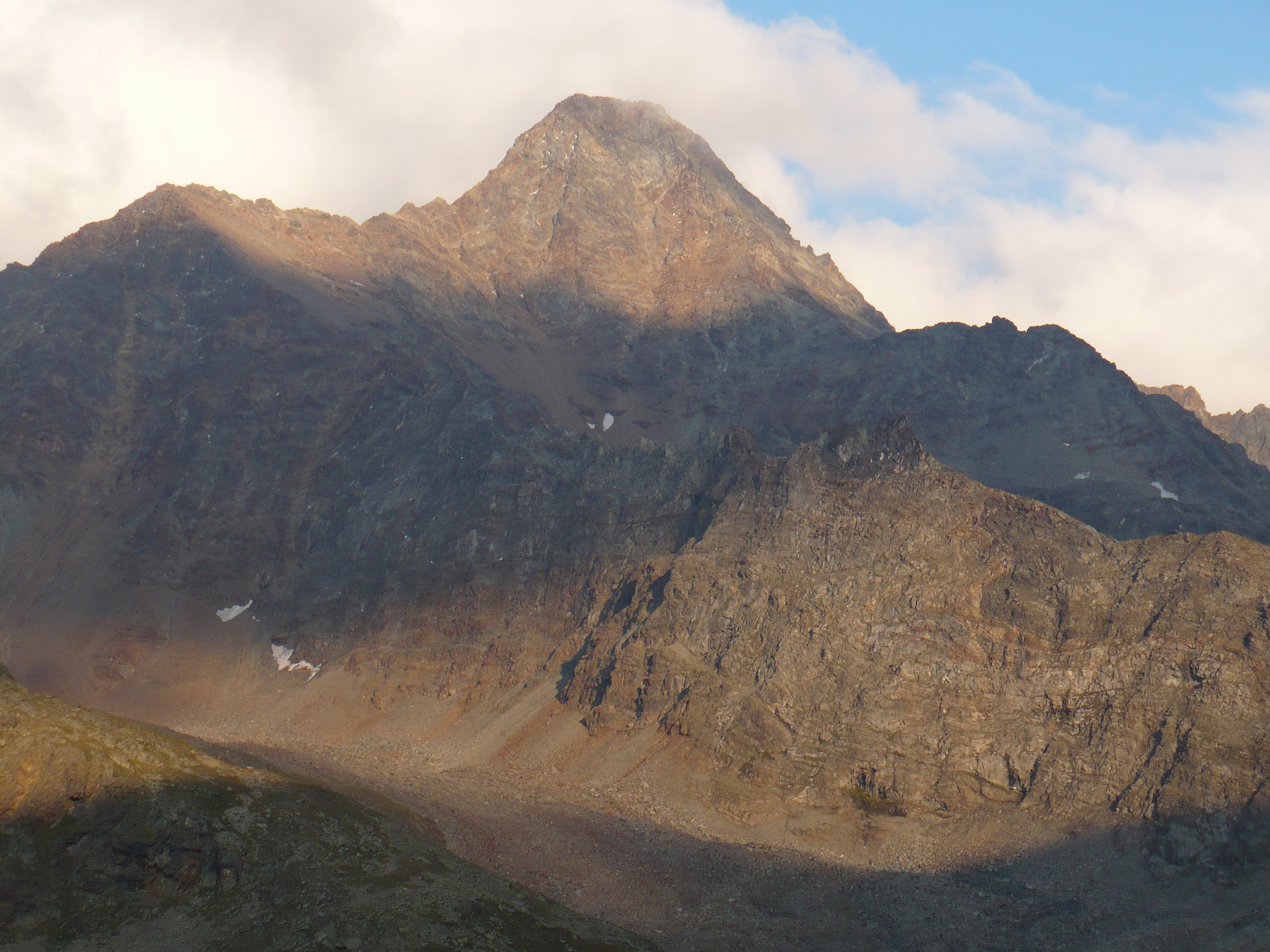

Highest point
- Elevation: 3,448 m (11,312 ft)
- Prominence: 294 m (965 ft)
- Listing: Alpine mountains above 3000 m
- Coordinates: 45°39′21″N 7°22′40″E

Geography
- Location within Alps
- Location: Aosta Valley, Italy
- Parent range: Graian Alps

Punta Garin (French: [ɡaʁɛ̃]) or Pic Garin or Pointe Garin (3,448 m) is a mountain of the Graian Alps, that is located just south of Monte Emilius in Aosta Valley, Italy. It boasts a pyramidal summit.

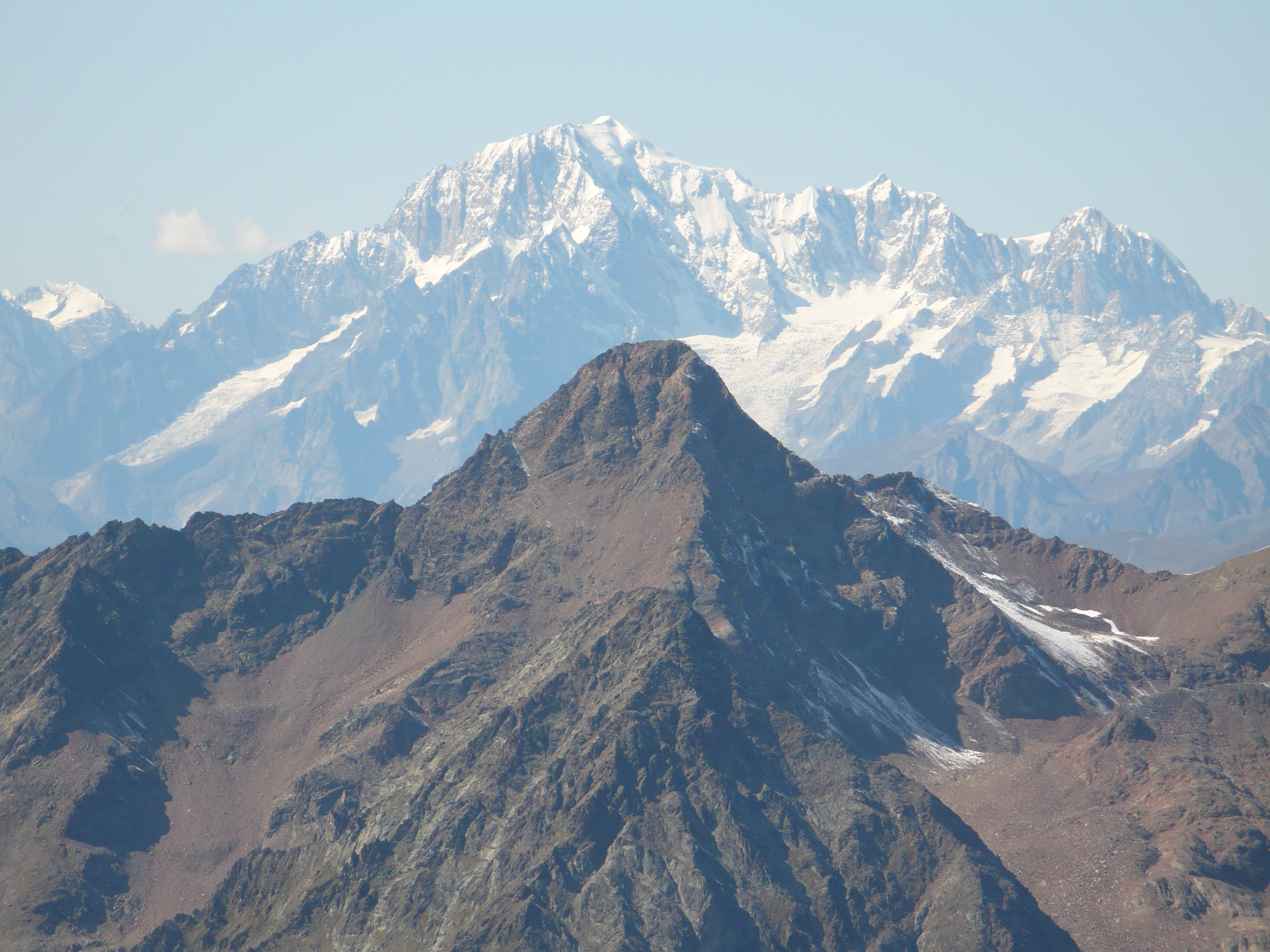
Pic Garin with Mont Blanc in the background.
