= Vittorio Sella Hut =

Mountain hut in Aosta Valley, Italy

Coordinates: 45°34′50″N 7°18′09″E

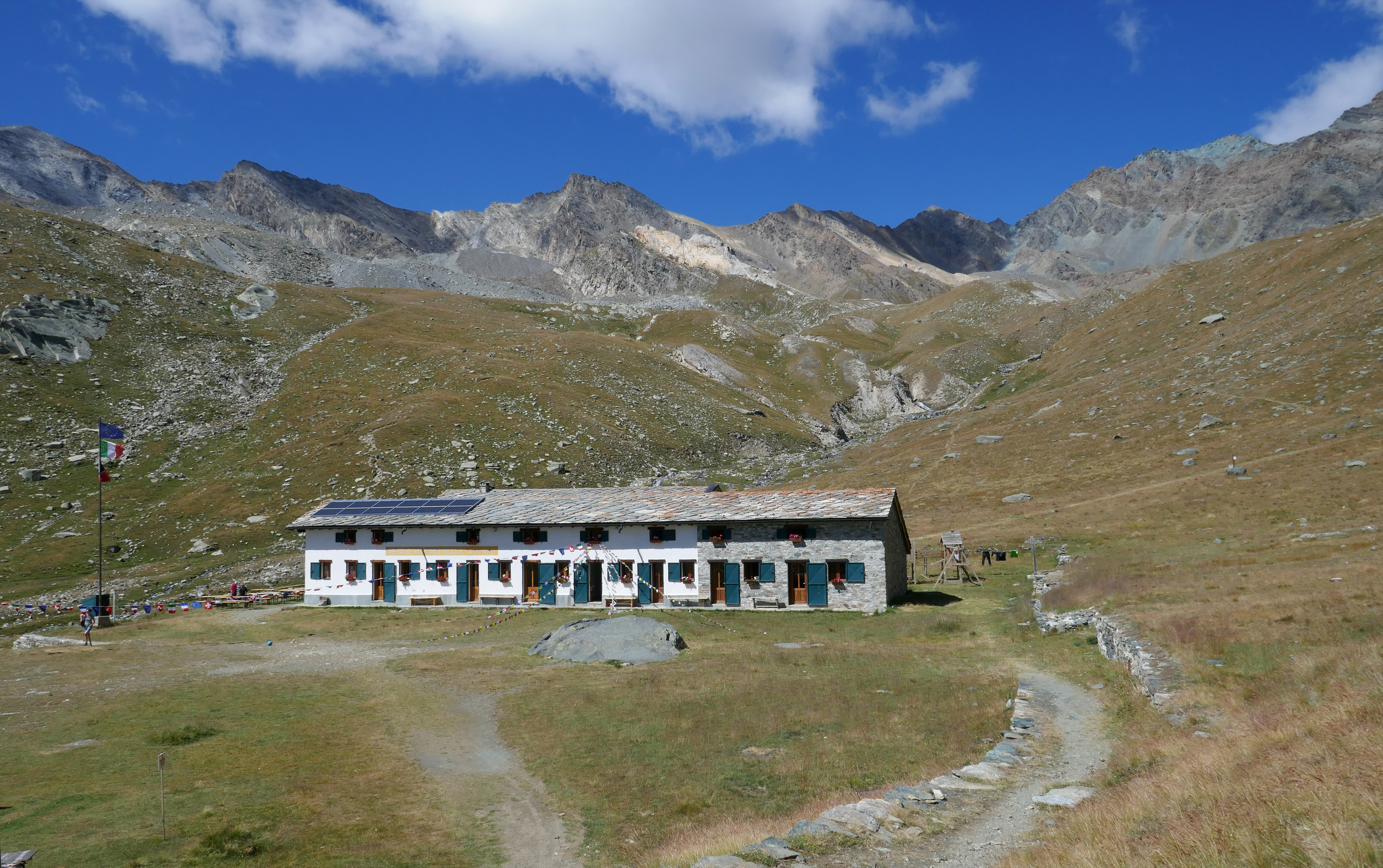
Vittorio Sella Hut

Vittorio Sella Hut (Italian: Rifugio Vittorio Sella; French: Refuge Victor Sella) is a mountain hut in the Alps in Aosta Valley, Italy.
