= Federico Chabod Hut =

Mountain hut in Aosta Valley, Italy

Coordinates: 45°32′25″N 7°14′20″E

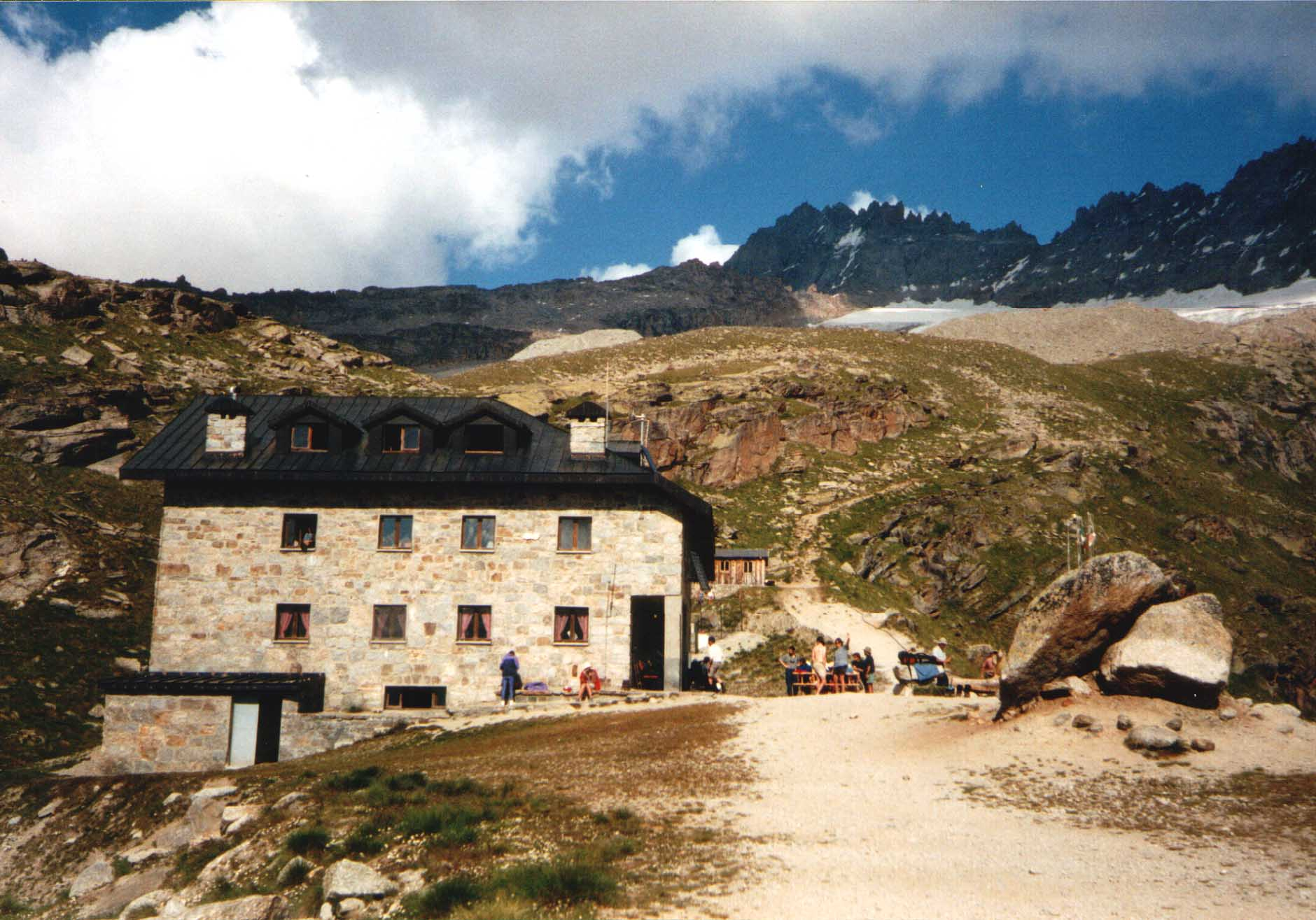
Chabod Hut

Federico Chabod Hut (Italian: Rifugio Federico Chabod; French: Refuge Frédéric Chabod) is a mountain hut in the Graian Alps in Aosta Valley, Italy, at an altitude of 2,710 metres (8,890 ft). It is owned by the Club Alpino Italiano, and named after Federico Chabod.
