= Gran Paradiso =

Mountain in the Graian Alps in Italy

- French: Grand Paradis
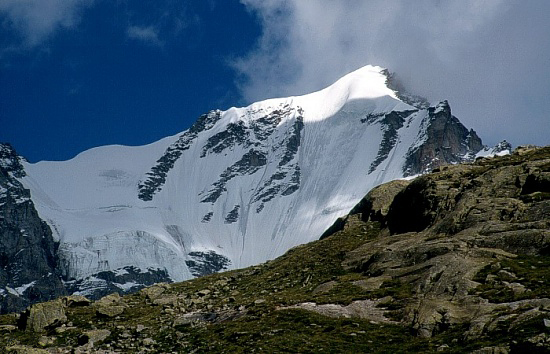
- The Gran Paradiso

Highest point
- Elevation: 4,061 m (13,323 ft)
- Prominence: 1,888 m (6,194 ft)
- Listing: Ultra
- Coordinates: 45°30′52″N 7°16′11″E

Naming
- Native name: Grant Paradis (Arpitan)
- English translation: 'Great Paradise'

Geography
- Location within Italy
- Location: Piedmont (Metropolitan City of Turin) and Aosta Valley, Italy
- Parent range: Graian Alps

Climbing
- First ascent: September 4, 1860 by Cowell, Dundas, Payot and Tairraz
- Easiest route: rock/ice climb

The Gran Paradiso (Italian pronunciation: [ˈɡram paraˈdiːzo]) or Grand Paradis (French pronunciation: [ɡʁɑ̃ paʁadi]; both lit. 'Great Paradise'; Arpitan: Grant Paradis) is a mountain in the Graian Alps in Italy, located between the Aosta Valley and Piedmont regions. It is located in Gran Paradiso National Park.

== Etymology ==
The Italian toponym Gran Paradiso derives, via the French Grand Paradis, as a mistranslation from the Aosta Valley patois Granta Parey, which originally means 'large wall'. It is the same etymology as nearby Granta Parey.

== Geography ==
The peak is the 7th highest mountain in the Graian Alps, with an elevation of 4,061 m. In the SOIUSA (International Standardized Mountain Subdivision of the Alps) the mountain belongs to an alpine subsection called "North-Eastern Graian Alps" (It:Alpi del Gran Paradiso; Fr:Alpes du Grand-Paradis) and also gives its name to the gruppo del Gran Paradiso.

While the Mont Blanc massif straddles the border between France and Italy, the Gran Paradiso is the only mountain above 4,000 meters that is entirely within Italian territory.

== Routes ==
Climbs normally start from either the Refuge Frédéric Chabod or the Refuge Victor-Emmanuel II. The latter is named after Victor Emmanuel II of Italy who created the Gran Paradiso royal reserve in 1856, presently the site of the Gran Paradiso National Park.

It is widely accepted that Gran Paradiso is one of the easiest four-thousanders to summit. This is not fully true, however, because while almost the entire route to the ridge is graded at F+, the last several dozen metres to the Virgin Mary (or Madonna) summit (Italian: Cima della Madonna, French: Pointe de la Madone or French: Pointe de la Vierge – 4058 m) comprises rock climbing with considerable exposure, with difficulties of grade I UIAA, while access to the proper main summit (4061 m) requires 15 minutes of climbing up to grade II UIAA. Gran Paradiso is popular with novice alpinists and many of these only climb to the Madonna summit.

In addition to the main summit routes, Gran Paradiso possesses a steep snow/ice North West Face, which can be climbed at AD+ from the Refuge Frédéric Chabod.

== Nature conservation ==
Gran Paradiso is located in the Gran Paradiso National Park, an Italian national park named after the mountain. On the French side of the border, the park is continued by the Vanoise National Park.

== See also ==
- List of 4000 metre peaks of the Alps
- Gran Paradiso Massif

== Maps ==
- Italian official cartography (Istituto Geografico Militare - IGM); on-line version: www.pcn.minambiente.it
- I.G.C. (Istituto Geografico Centrale) - Carta dei sentieri e dei rifugi 1:50.000 scale n.3 Parco Nazionale del Gran Paradiso and 1:25.000 n.101 Gran Paradiso, La Grivola, Cogne
