= Valsavarenche =

Valsavarenche Ouahèntse (Valdôtain)
- Comune
- Comune di Valsavarenche; Commune de Valsavarenche
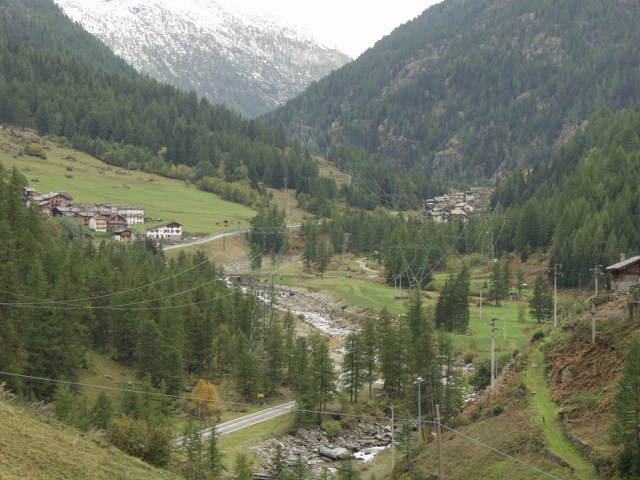

- Coat of arms

- Location within Italy Location within Aosta Valley
- Coordinates: 45°35′32″N 7°12′28″E
- Country: Italy
- Region: Aosta Valley
- Province: none
- Frazioni: Bien, Bois-de-Clin, Le Breuil, Le Créton, Dégioz (sometimes “Déjoz”), Le Donzel, L'Eau-Rousse, Fénille, Le Foncey, Lotaz, Le Lou (Loup), Maisonnasse, Molère, Le Nex, Payel, Le Pessey, Le Plan-de-la-Pesse, Le Pont, Rioulaz, Rovenaud, Le Terré, Tignet, Toulaplanaz, Les Toules, Vers-le-Bois

Government
  - Mayor: Roger Georgy (Civic list Ouhaentse pour notre pays)

Area
  - Total: 139 km^{2} (54 sq mi)
- Elevation: 1,000–4,061 m (3,281–13,323 ft)

Population (31 December 2022)
  - Total: 161
  - Density: 1.16/km^{2} (3.00/sq mi)
- Demonym: Valsavareins
- Time zone: UTC+1 (CET)
  - Summer (DST): UTC+2 (CEST)
- Postal code: 11010
- Dialing code: 0165
- Patron saint: Our Lady of Mount Carmel
- Saint day: 16 July
- Website: Official website

Valsavarenche (French: [valsavaʁɑ̃ʃ]; local Valdôtain: Ouahèntse; known as Valsavara under fascist rule from 1939 to 1946, and as Valsavaranche from 1946 to 1976) is a comune in the Aosta Valley, northern Italy. It is part of the Unité des communes valdôtaines du Grand-Paradis.

== Villages ==
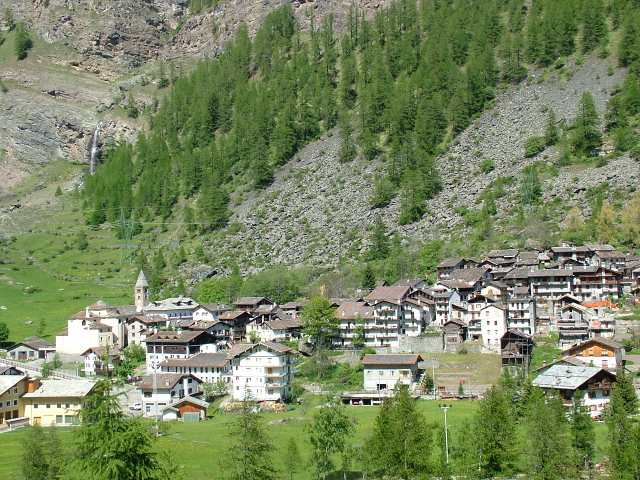
Déjoz.

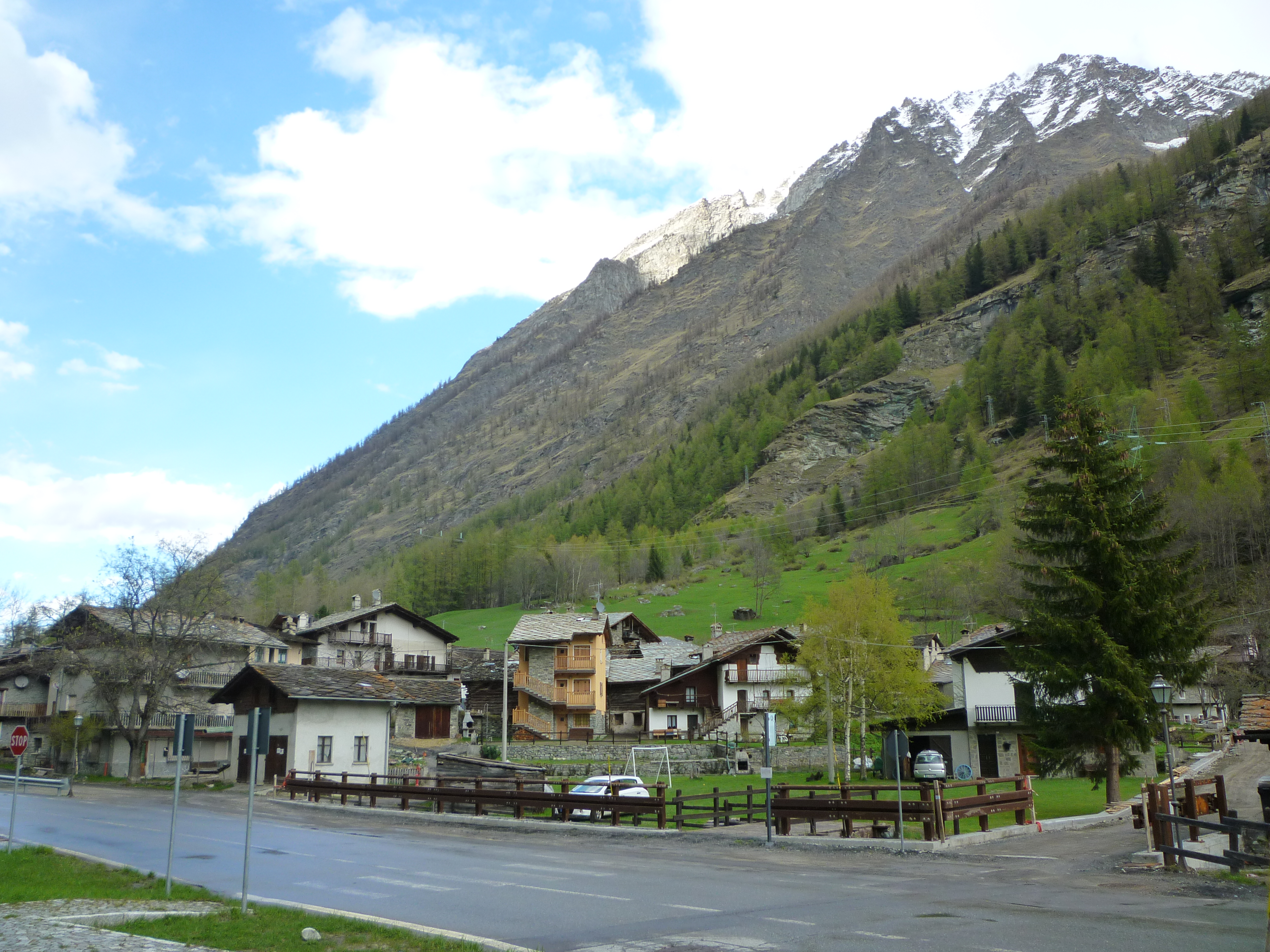
Rovenaud.

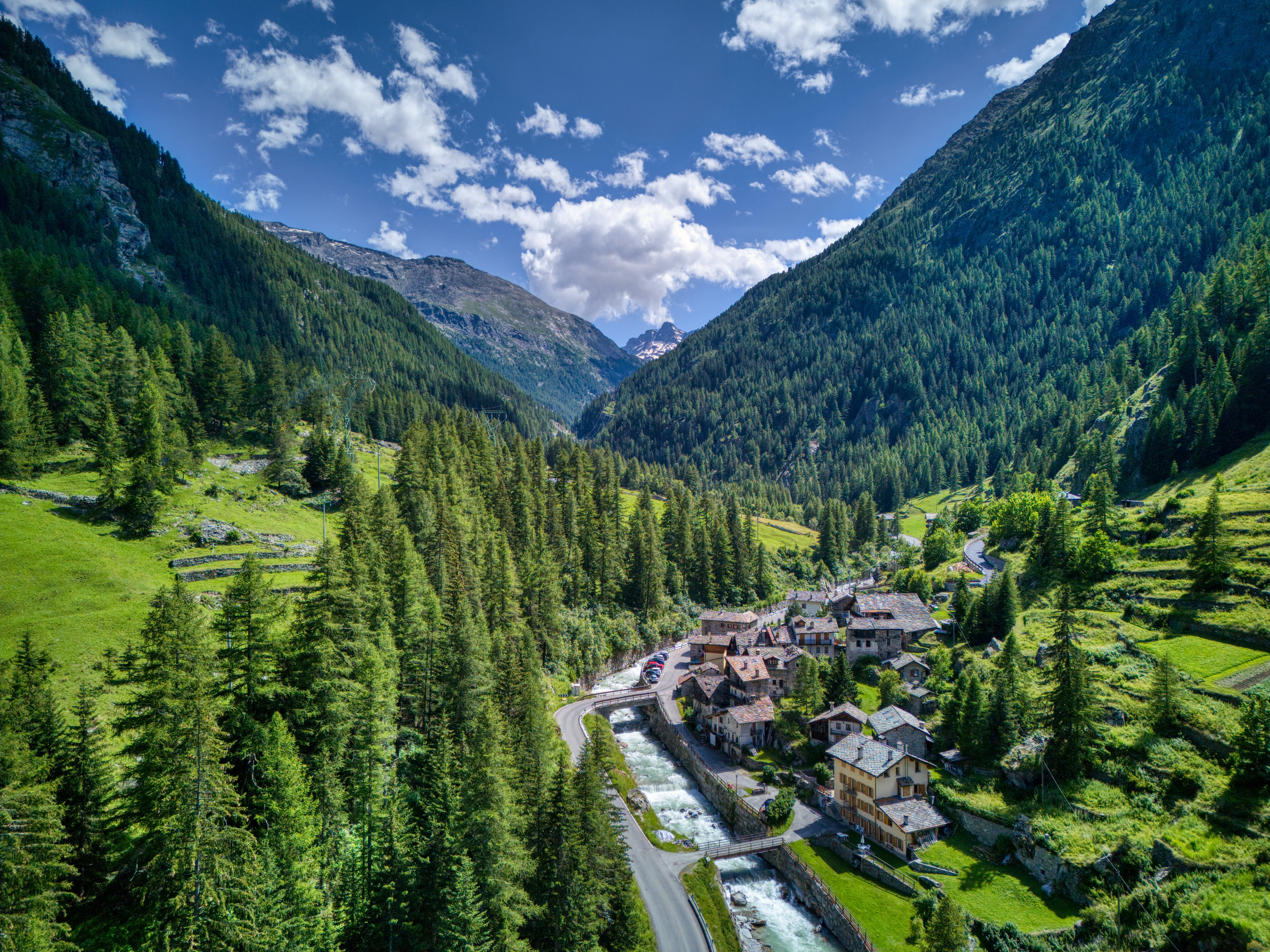
Maisonnasse.

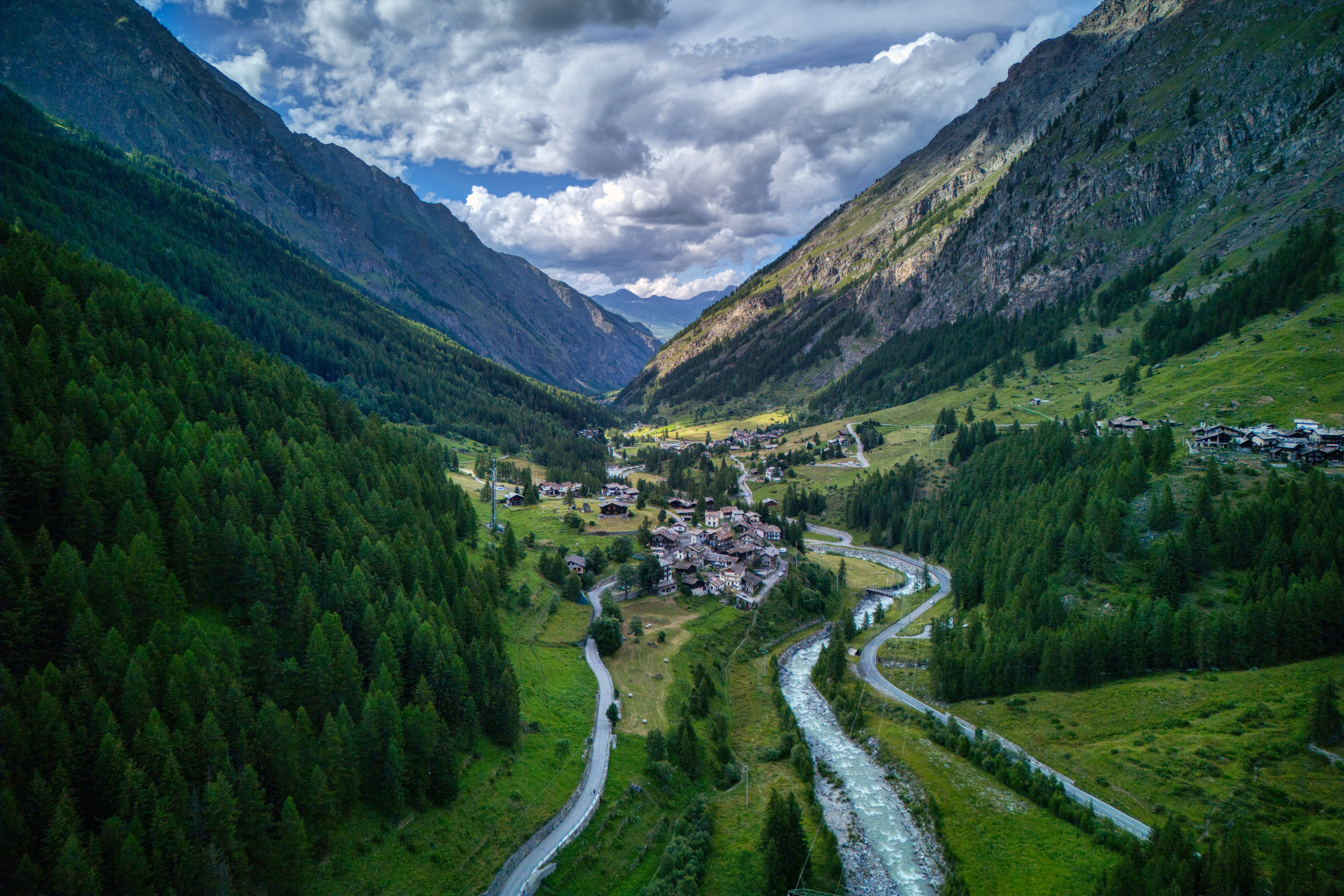
Le Créton.

== See also ==
- Mont Tout Blanc
