= Gran Paradiso National Park =

Italian national park

Parco nazionale del Gran Paradiso Parc national du Grand-Paradis
- IUCN category II (national park)
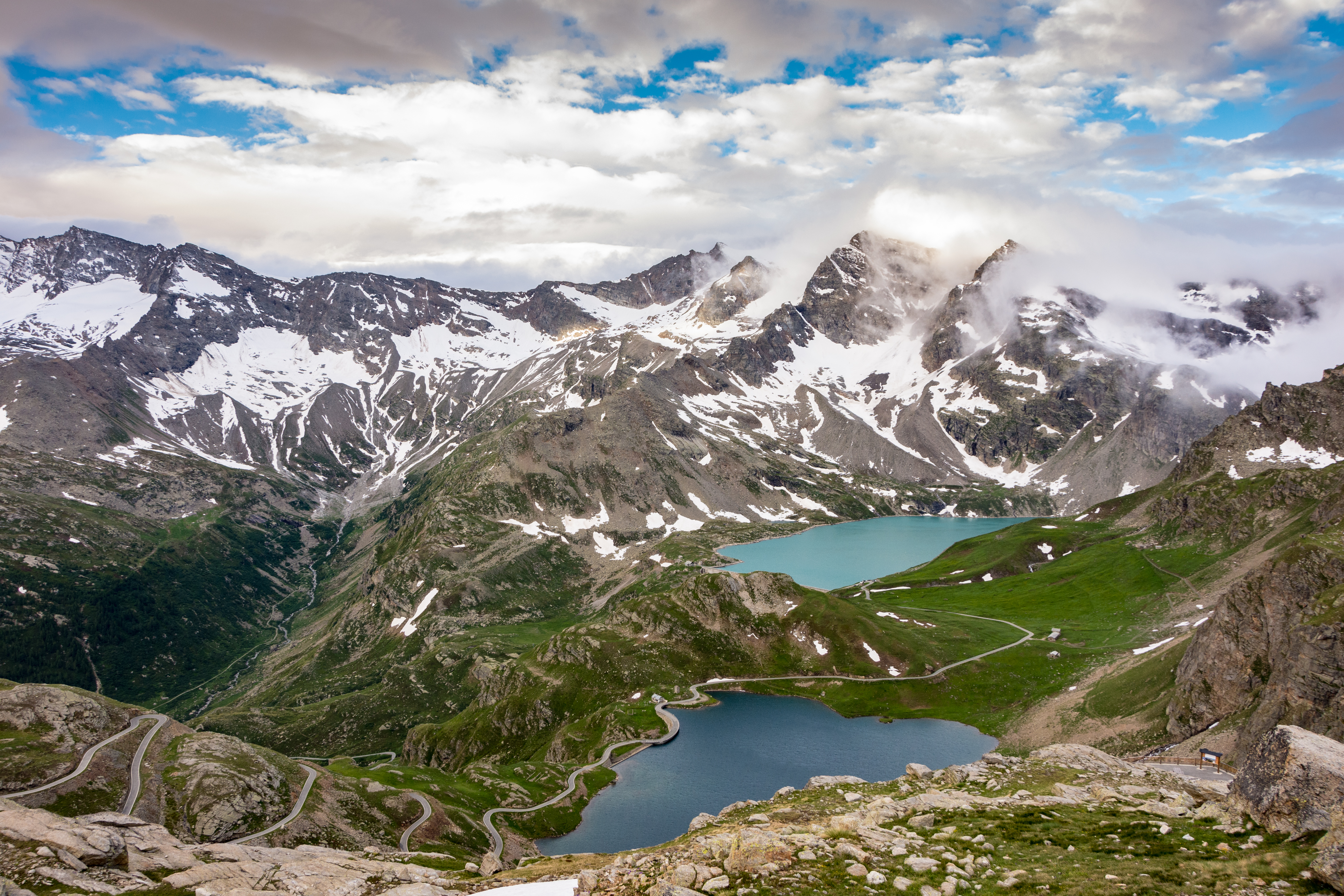

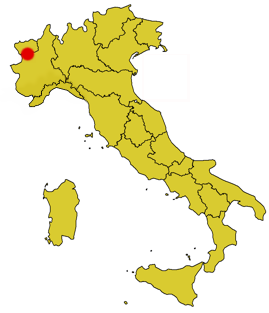
- Location of park
- Coordinates: 45°30′10″N 7°18′36″E
- Area: 703 km^{2} (271 mi^{2})
- Established: 1922
- Governing body: Ministero dell'Ambiente
- Website: www.pngp.it

Gran Paradiso National Park (Italian: Parco nazionale del Gran Paradiso; French: Parc national du Grand Paradis) is an Italian national park in the Graian Alps, between the Aosta Valley and Piedmont regions. The park is named after Gran Paradiso mountain, which is located in the park; it is contiguous with the French Vanoise National Park. The land the park encompasses was initially protected in order to protect the Alpine ibex from poachers, as it was a personal hunting ground for King Victor Emmanuel II, but now also protects other species.

== History ==
In the early 19th century, due to hunting, the Alpine ibex survived in the Gran Paradiso and Vanoise area. Approximately 60 individual ibex survived here. Ibex were intensively hunted, partly for sport, but also because their body parts were thought to have therapeutic properties: talismans were made from a small cross-shaped bone near the ibex's heart in order to protect against violent death. Due to the alarming decrease in the ibex population, Victor Emmanuel, soon to be King of Italy, declared the Royal Hunting Reserve of the Gran Paradiso in 1856. A protective guard was created for the ibex. Paths laid out for the ibex are still used today as part of 724 kilometres (450 miles) of marked trails and mule tracks.

In 1920, Victor Emmanuel II's grandson King Victor Emmanuel III donated the park's original 21 square kilometres (5,189 acres), and the park was established in 1922. It was Italy's first national park. There were approximately 3,000 ibex in the park when it was instituted. The institution of the park led to an increase in the ibex population, which reached 4,000 by 1933. In the following decade, despite the presence of the park, a worsening of the quality of surveillance under Fascist rule, poaching and World War II led to a steady decrease in the ibex population. By 1945, only 419 remained. Their protection was re-established after the war, and there were 4,000 in the park in 2005.

== Geography ==
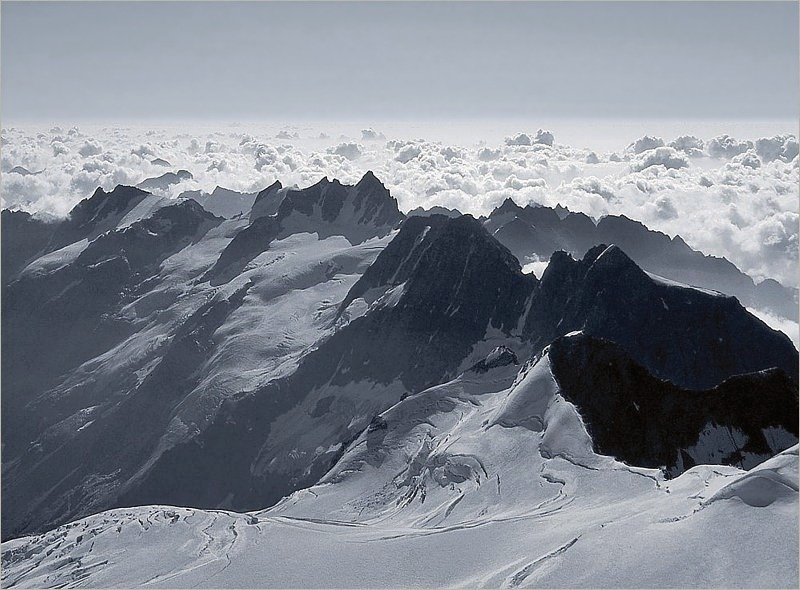
Gran Paradiso mountain

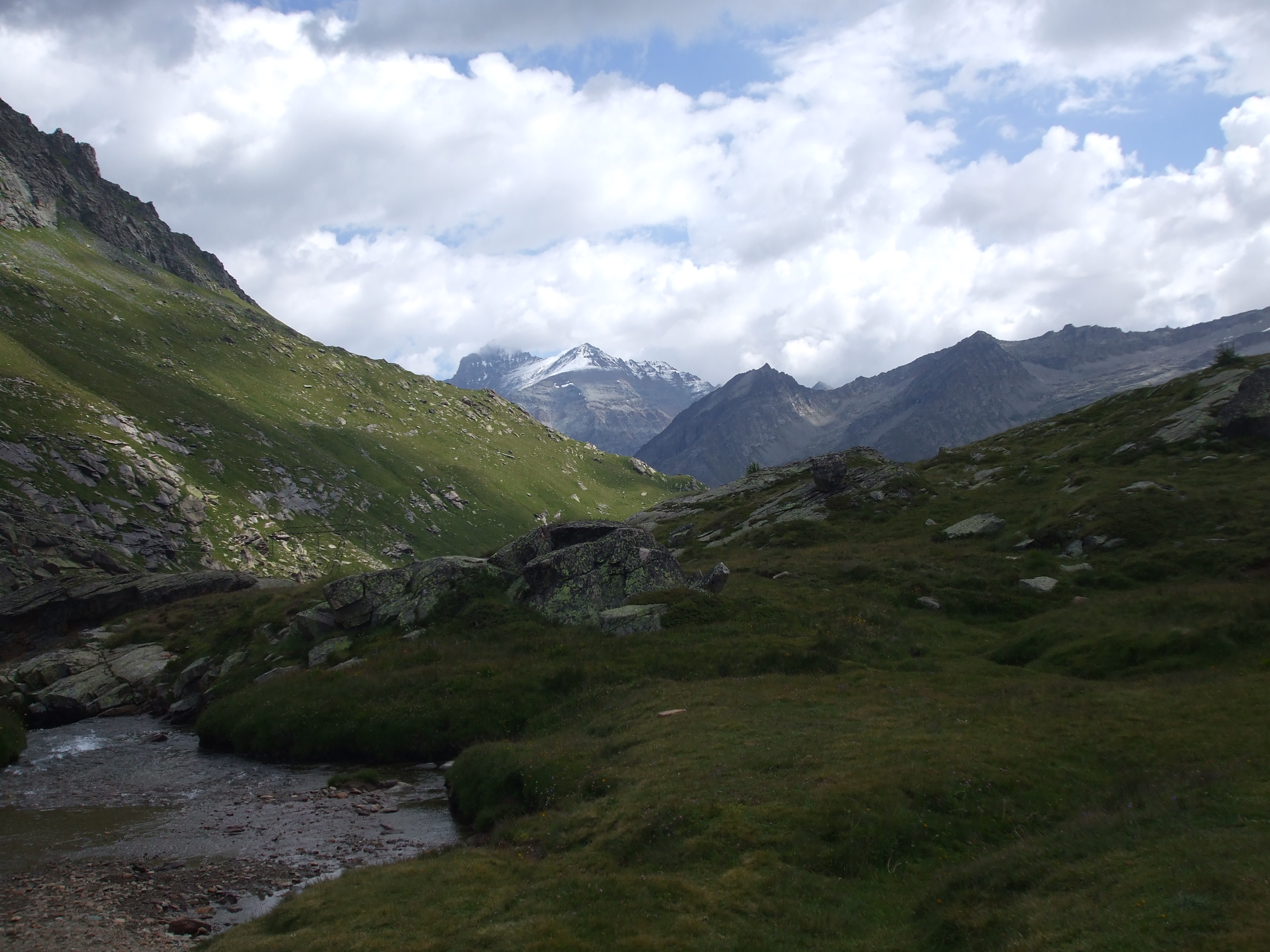
Plateau de Nivolet

The park is located in the Graian Alps in the regions of Piedmont (in the Metropolitan City of Turin) and Aosta Valley in northwest Italy. It encompasses 703 square kilometres (174,000 acres) of alpine terrain. 10% of the park's surface area is wooded. 16.5% is used for agriculture and pasture, 24% is uncultivated, and 40% is classified as sterile. 9.5% of the park's surface area is occupied by 57 glaciers. The park's mountains and valleys were sculpted by glaciers and streams. Altitudes in the park range from 800–4,061 metres (2,625–13,323 ft), with an average altitude of 2,000 metres (6,600 feet). Valley floors in the park are forested. There are alpine meadows at higher altitudes. There are rocks and glaciers at altitudes higher than the meadows. Gran Paradiso is the only mountain entirely within the boundaries of Italy that is over 4,000 metres (13,000 feet) high. Mont Blanc and the Matterhorn can be seen from its summit. In 1860, John Cowell became the first person to reach the summit. To the west, the park shares a boundary with France's Vanoise National Park. They co-operate in managing the ibex population, which moves across their shared boundary seasonally.

== Flora ==
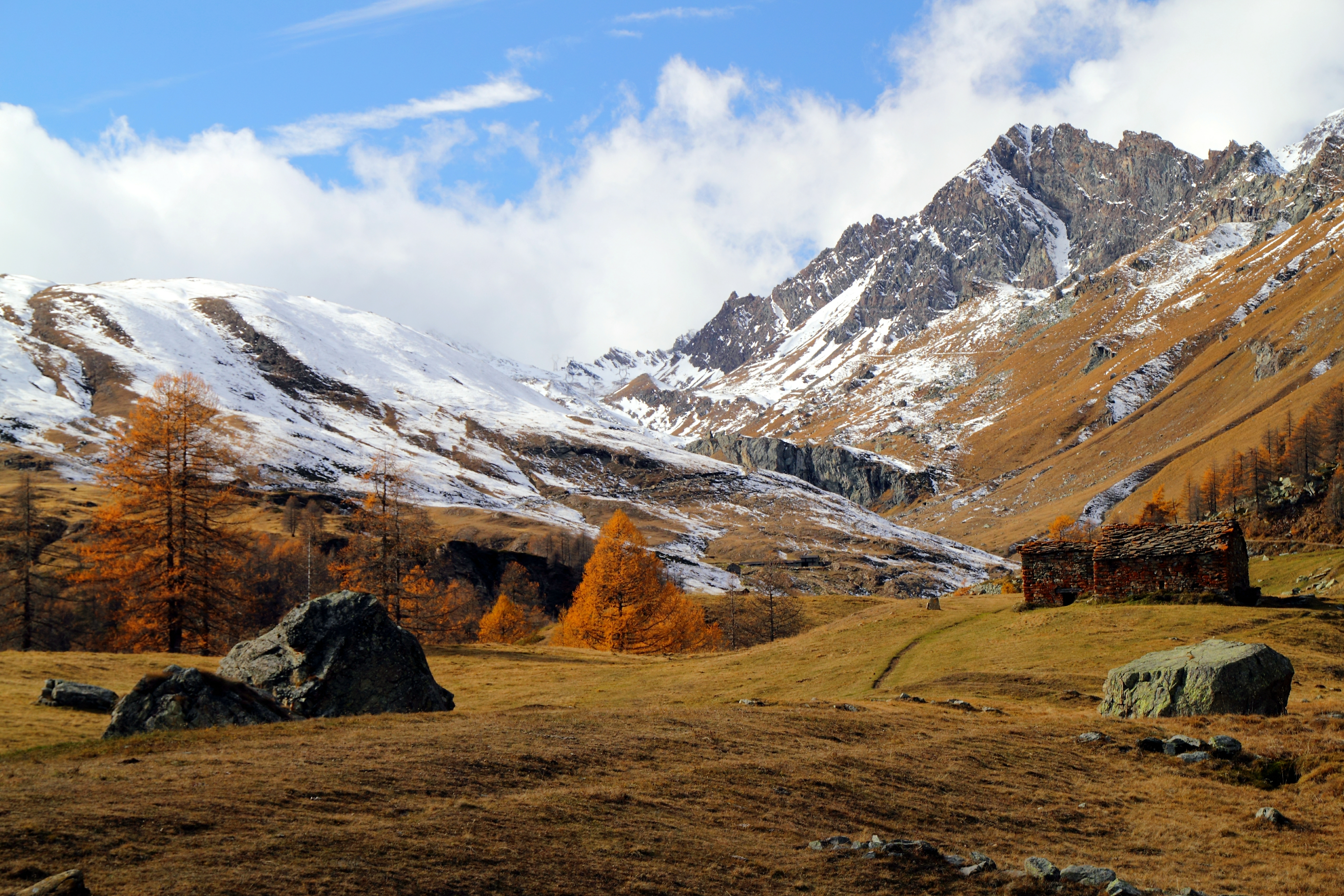
The park in autumn

The park's woods are important because they provide shelter for a large number of animals. They are a natural defence against landslides, avalanches, and flooding. The two main types of woods found in the park are coniferous and deciduous woods. The deciduous European beech forests are common on the Piedmont side of the park and are not found on the dryer Valle d'Aosta side. These forests are thick with dense foliage that lets in very little light during the summer. The beech leaves take a long time to decompose and they form a thick layer on the woodland floor that impedes the development of other plants and trees. Larches are the most common trees in the forests on the valley floors. They are mixed with spruces, Swiss stone pines and more rarely silver firs.

Maple and lime forests are found in gulleys. These forests are only present in isolated areas and are at risk of extinction. Downy oak woods are more common in the Aosta Valley area than in the Piedmont area because of its higher temperatures and lower precipitation. Oak is not a typical species in the park and it is often found mixed with Scots pine. The park's chestnut groves have been affected by human cultivation of wood and fruit. It rarely grows above 1,000 metres (3,300 feet), and the most important chestnut forests are on the park's Piedmontese side. The park's conifer woods include Scots pine groves, spruce forests dominated by the Norway spruce, often mixed with larch. Larch and Swiss stone pine woods are found up to the highest sub-alpine level (2,200–2,300 metres (7,200–7,500 ft)).

At higher altitudes, the trees gradually thin out and there are alpine pastures. These pastures are rich in flowers in the late spring. The wildflowers in the park's high meadows include wild pansies, gentians, martagon lilies and alpenroses. The park has many rocky habitats. They are mostly located above the timberline and alpine pastures. These areas have rock and detritus on their surface. Alpine plants have adapted to these habitats by assuming characteristics like dwarfism, hairiness, bright coloured flowers and highly developed roots. About 1,500 plant species can be seen at Paradisia Alpine Botanical Garden near Cogne inside the park.

== Fauna ==
Alpine ibex graze in the abundant mountain pastures in summer, and descend to lower elevations in winter. Gran Paradiso's pairing with Vanoise National Park provides year-round protection to the ibex. Along with the ibex, the animal species found in the park include ermine, weasel, hare, Eurasian badger, alpine chamois, wolf (recently arrived from Central Italy) and, after a century's absence, the lynx. The ibex and chamois spend most of the year above the tree line. They descend to the valleys in the winter and spring. Alpine marmot forage on plants along the snow line.

There are more than 100 bird species in the park, including Eurasian eagle-owl, rock ptarmigan, alpine accentor and chough. Golden eagles nest on rocky ledges and sometimes in trees. Wallcreeper are found on steep cliffs. There are black woodpeckers and nutcrackers in the park's woodlands.

The park supports many species of butterflies including apollos, peak whites and southern white admirals.

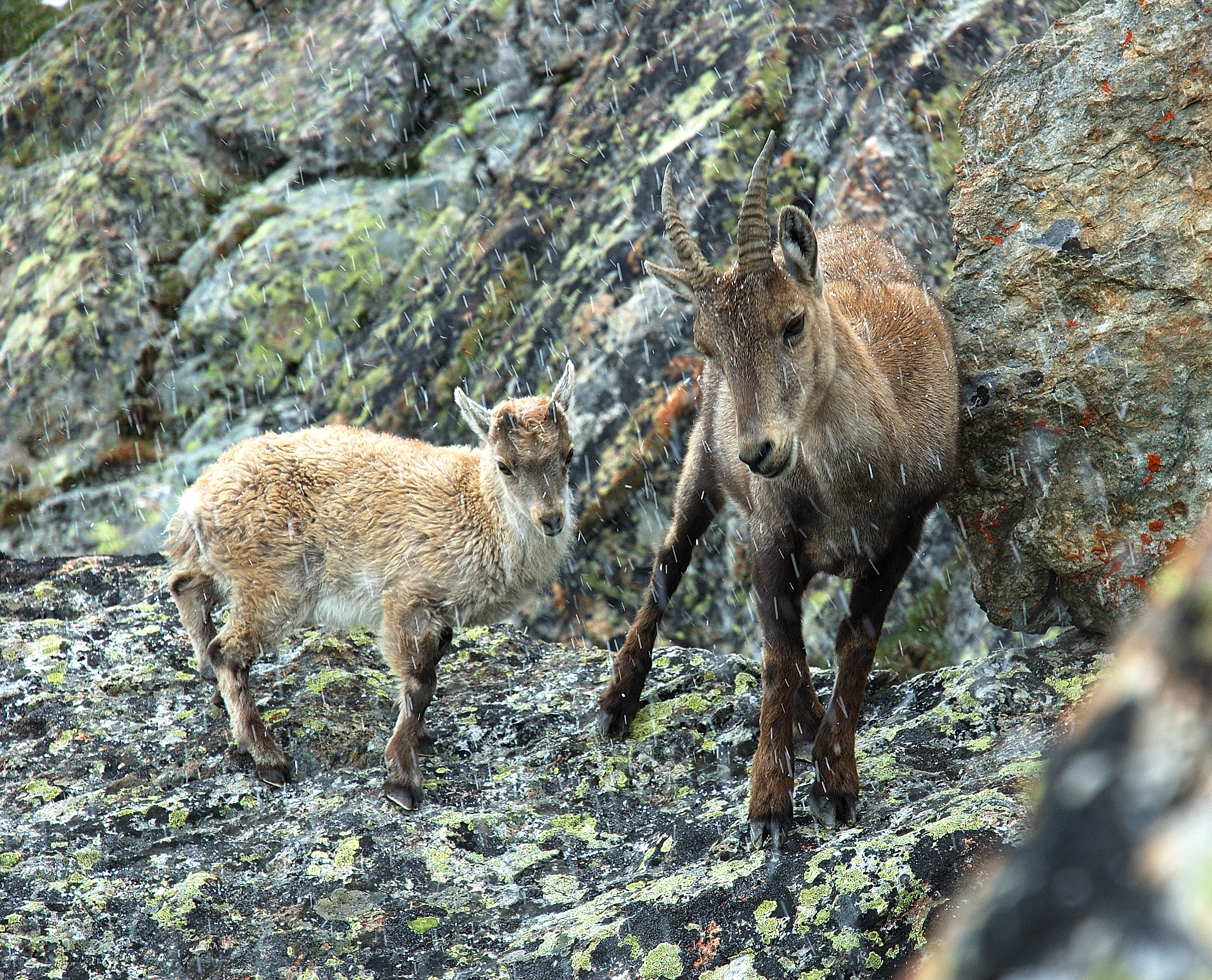
Alpine ibex

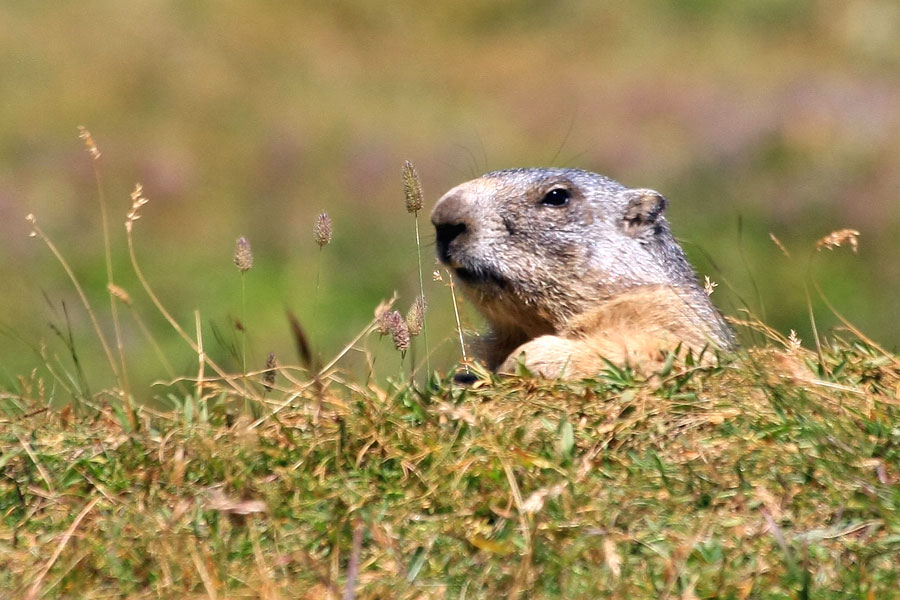
Marmot
