= Croce Rossa =

Mountain in Italy

- Croix Rousse
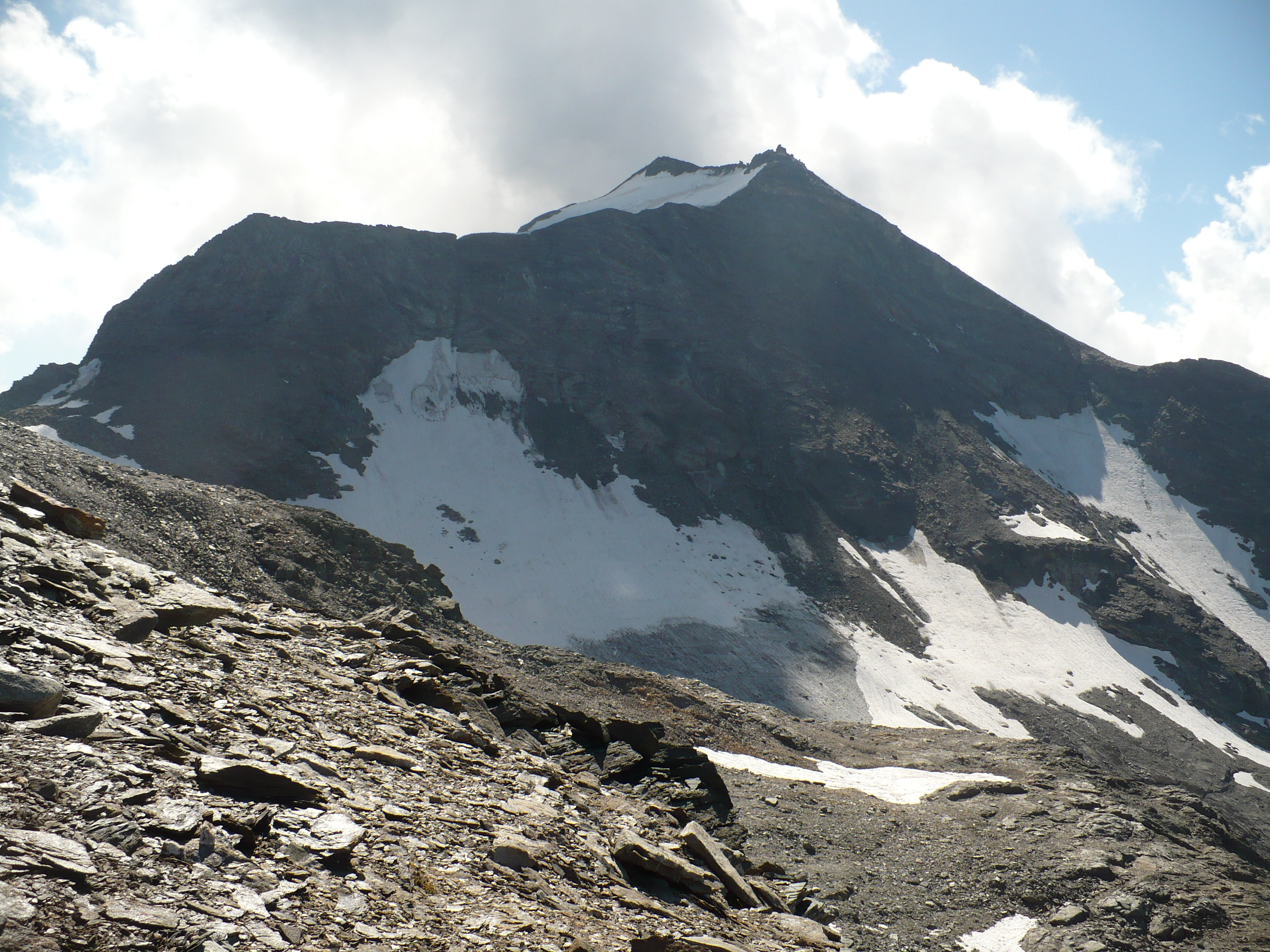
- Croce Rossa

Highest point
- Elevation: 3,566 m (11,699 ft)
- Prominence: 495 m (1,624 ft)
- Isolation: 4.78 km (2.97 mi)
- Listing: Alpine mountains above 3000 m
- Coordinates: 45°16′N 7°8′E

Geography
- Location within Alps
- Location: Piedmont, Italy and Savoie, France
- Parent range: Graian Alps

Climbing
- First ascent: 1857

The Croce Rossa (Italian: [ˈkroːtʃe ˈrossa]) or Croix Rousse (French: [kʁwa ʁus]; both lit. 'Red Cross') is a mountain of the Graian Alps, on the border between Piedmont, Italy and Savoie, France.

== Features ==
The mountain lies at the head of the Viù Valley in the Lanzo Valleys. It has a height of 3,566m and was first climbed in 1857 by A Tonini. There is a statue of the Madonna on its summit.

=== Mountain huts ===
- Refuge d'Avérole - 2,210 m;
- Rifugio Luigi Cibrario - 2,616 m.

== Maps ==
- Istituto Geografico Militare (IGM) official maps of Italy, 1:25.000 and 1:100.000 scale, on-line version
- Istituto Geografico Centrale (IGC) - Carta dei sentieri e dei rifugi scala 1:50.000 n. 2 Valli di Lanzo e Moncenisio
- Istituto Geografico Centrale - Carta dei sentieri e dei rifugi scala 1:25.000 n.110 Alte Valli di Lanzo (Rocciamelone - Uja di Ciamarella - Le Levanne)
