= Refuge d'Avérole =

Coordinates: 45°17′50″N 7°05′04″E

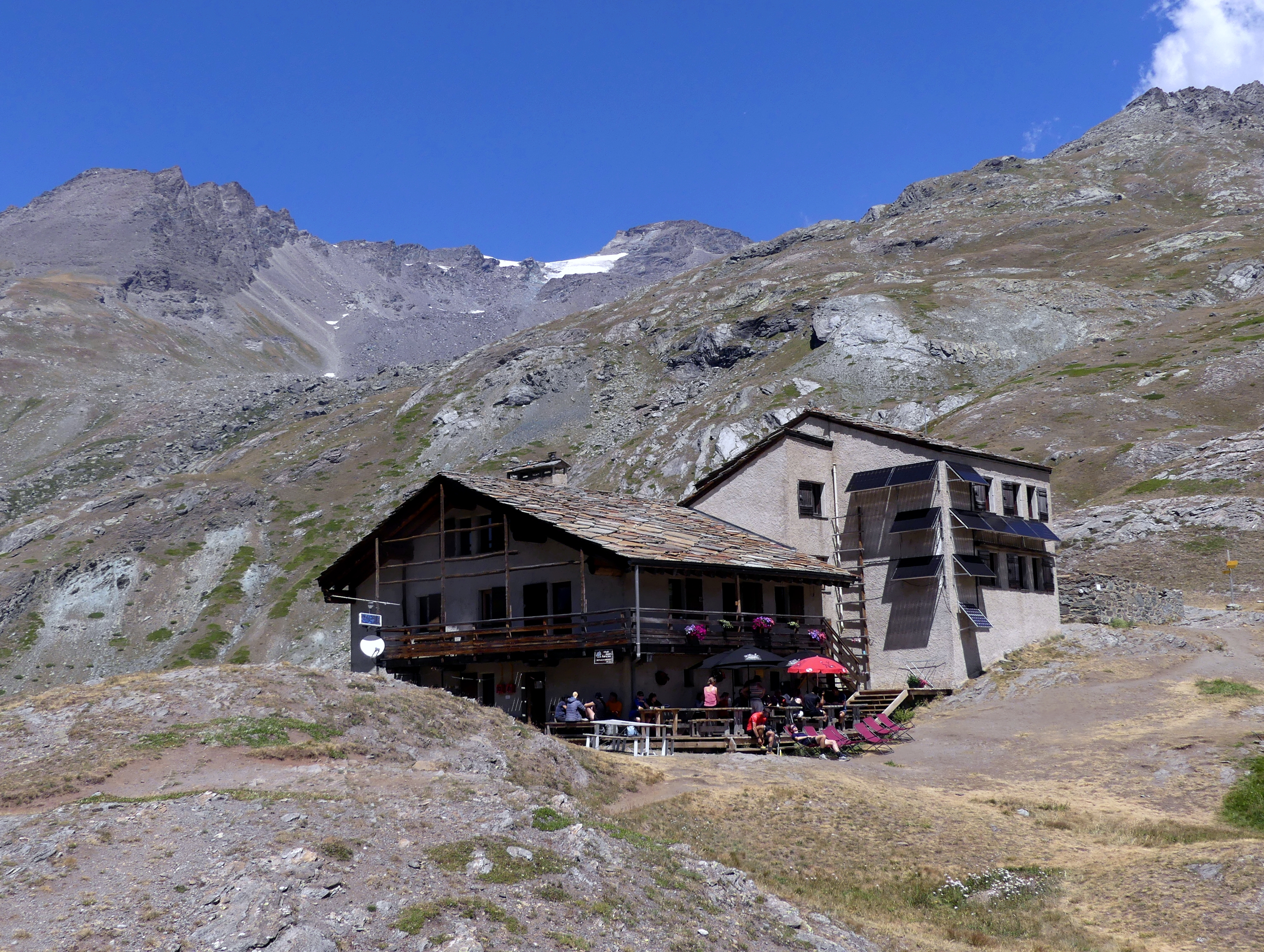

Refuge d'Avérole is a refuge in the Alps.
