= Mount Giavino =

Mountain in Italy

- Location within Alps

Highest point
- Elevation: 2,766 m (9,075 ft)
- Prominence: 26 m (85 ft)
- Coordinates: 45°30′44″N 7°37′30″E

Geography
- Location: Piedmont, Italy

Mount Giavino (Italian: Monte Giavino, French: Mont Giavin) is a 2,766 m (9,075 ft) tall mountain of the Graian Alps in northern Italy. Its summit lies on the border between the municipalities of Traversella and Frassinetto in Piedmont, Italy.

== Description ==
Mount Giavino stands along the ridge that forms the divide between the Chiusella Valley to the east and the Soana Valley to the west. The ridge reaches its highest point at Monfandì (2,820 m, 9,250 ft), located about 1.5 km (0.93 mi) north of Mount Giavino's summit.

== SOIUSA classification ==
According to the SOIUSA (International Standardized Mountain Subdivision of the Alps) the mountain can be classified in the following way:

- main part = Western Alps
- major sector = North Western Alps
- section = Graian Alps
- subsection = Alpi del Gran Paradiso
- supergroup = Gruppo della Rosa dei Banchi
- group = Costiera del Monte Giavino

== Ascent ==
The summit of Mount Giavino is most commonly reached from Fondo, a hamlet of Traversella in the Chiusella Valley. The route follows the upper part of the valley before ascending towards the Colle Artisol and then continuing along the eastern crest to the summit.
