= Punta di Verzel =

Mountain in Italy

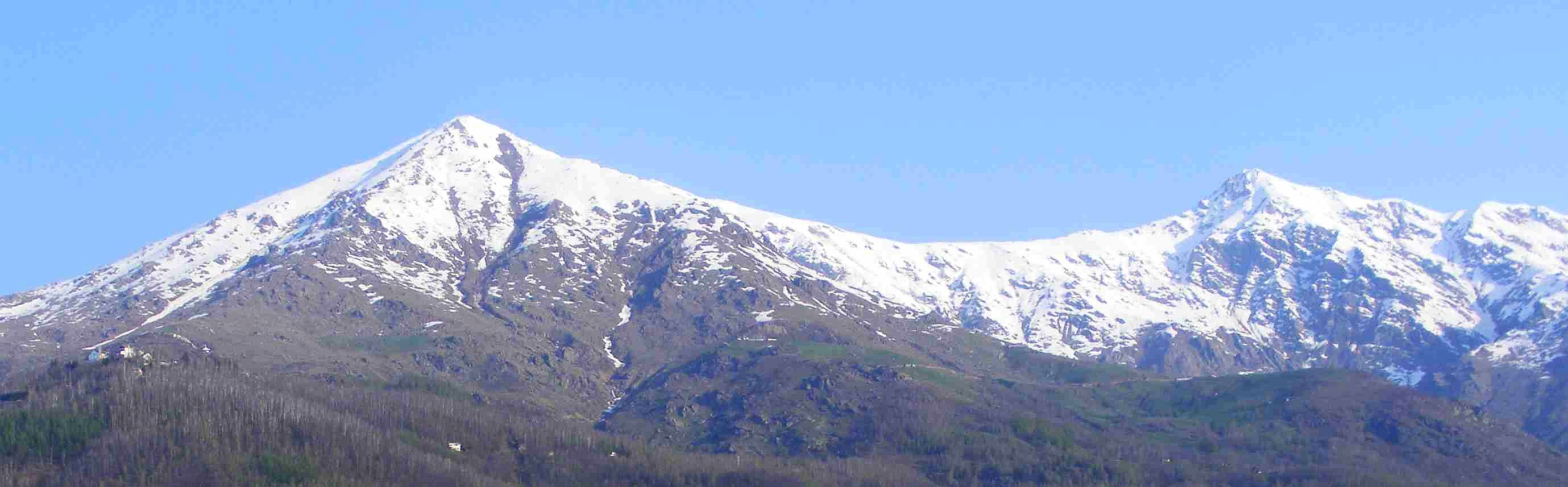
- Punta di Verzel, on the right, from Cintano

Highest point
- Elevation: 2,406 m (7,894 ft)
- Prominence: 156 m (512 ft)
- Coordinates: 45°28′38″N 7°39′00″E

Geography
- Location within Alps
- Location: Piedmont, Italy

Punta di Verzel is a 2,406 m (7,894 ft) tall mountain of the Graian Alps in northern Italy. Its summit lies on the border between the municipalities of Frassinetto and Castelnuovo Nigra in Piedmont, Italy.

== Description ==
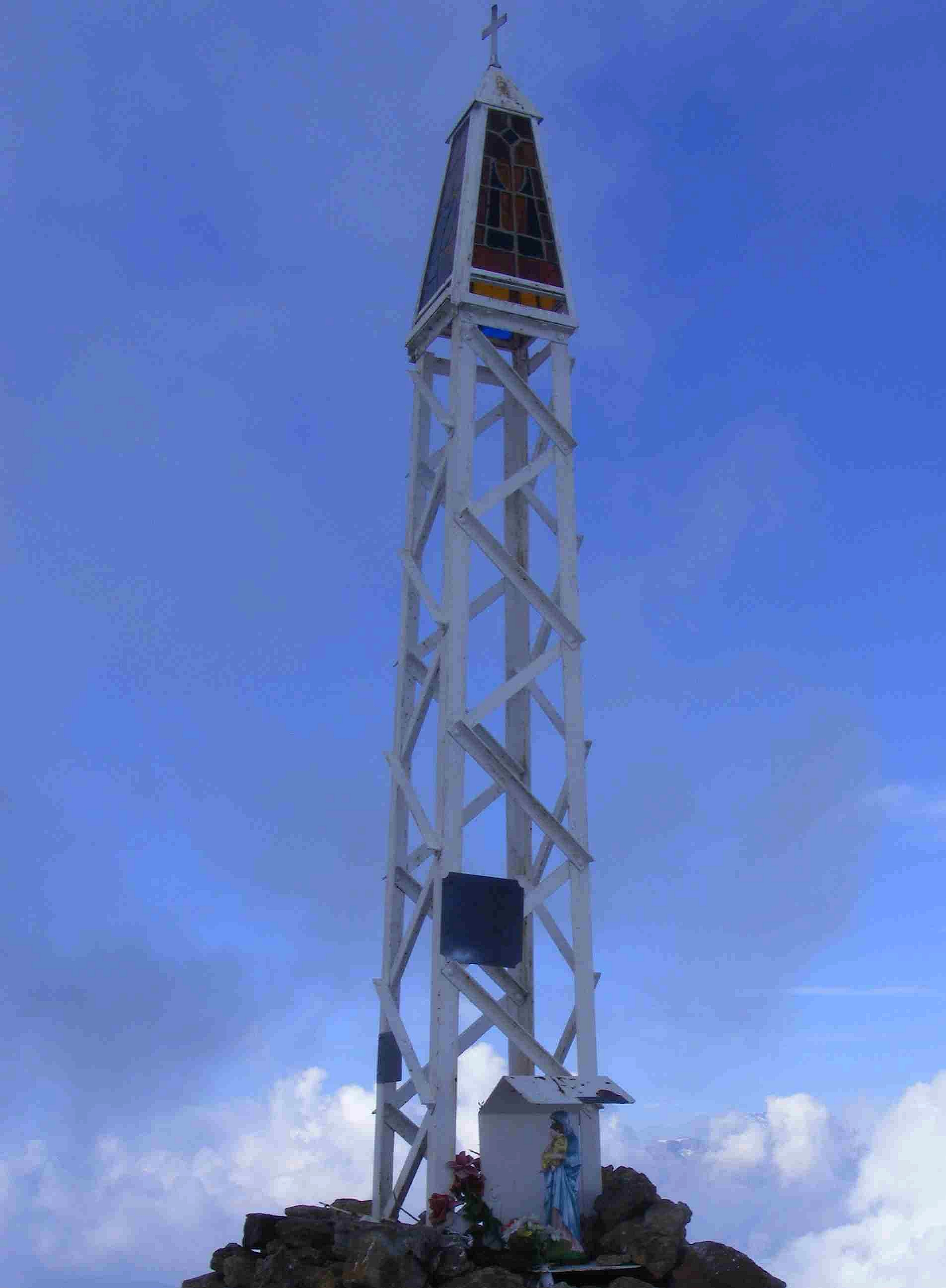
The summit cross in 2009

Punta di Verzel stands on the watershed separating the Soana Valley to the west from the shorter Savenca Valley, a side valley of the Chiusella Valley, and the Sacred Valley to the east. At Punta di Verzel, the ridge branches into two distinct lines. To the southwest, it descends toward the depression of Piano dei Francesi (2,168 m, 7,113 ft), beyond which it rises again to Punta Quinseina. To the east, it separates the Sacred Valley from the Savenca Valley and forms Mount Calvo (1,323 m, 4,341 ft) before gradually descending and ending just north of Castelnuovo Nigra. North of Punta di Verzel, the main ridge continues toward the nearby Punta Prafoura (2,362 m, 7,749 ft) and Monte Cavallo (2,355 m, 7,726 ft) before culminating at Monfandì (2,820 m, 9,250 ft).

The Piova stream rises on the southeastern slopes of Punta di Verzel, while the northeastern slope is home to the small Lake Asnì.

The summit is marked by a small metal structure topped by a cross and decorated with colored glass. Thanks to its prominent position, the mountain offers excellent panoramic views and is itself clearly visible from much of the Canavese.

== SOIUSA classification ==
According to the SOIUSA (International Standardized Mountain Subdivision of the Alps) the mountain can be classified in the following way:

- main part = Western Alps
- major sector = North Western Alps
- section = Graian Alps
- subsection = Alpi del Gran Paradiso
- supergroup = Gruppo della Rosa dei Banchi
- group = Costiera del Monte Giavino

== Ascent ==
The summit of Punta di Verzel is most commonly reached from the Sacred Valley. The route starts at Alpe Frera, goes through Refuge Fornetto and reaches the summit from the south.
