= Mount Debat =

Mountain in Italy

- Location within Alps

Highest point
- Elevation: 2,622 m (8,602 ft)
- Coordinates: 45°33′27″N 7°41′19″E

Geography
- Location: Province of Turin, Italy; Aosta Valley, Italy

Mount Debat (French: [dəba]; Italian: Monte Debat, French: Mont Debat) is a 2,622 m (8,602 ft) tall mountain of the Graian Alps in northern Italy. Its summit lies on the boundary between the municipalities of Donnas and Pontboset in the Aosta Valley, and Traversella in Piedmont, Italy.

== Description ==
Mount Debat rises along the watershed that separates the Chiusella Valley in Piedmont from the Champorcher Valley and the Fer Valley, both located in the Aosta Valley region. It is one of the main summits of the ridge that extends northeastward to Monte dei Corni (2,778 m (9,114 ft)). From the summit, two secondary ridges branch off, descending respectively toward Mount Vailet (2,613 m (8,573 ft)) and Mount Brignon (2,360 m (7,740 ft)).

The summit offers extensive views over the lower Aosta Valley, Monte Rosa, and the mountains of the Chiusella Valley.

== SOIUSA classification ==
According to the SOIUSA (International Standardized Mountain Subdivision of the Alps) the mountain can be classified in the following way:

- main part = Western Alps
- major sector = North Western Alps
- section = Graian Alps
- subsection = Alpi del Gran Paradiso
- supergroup = Gruppo della Rosa dei Banchi
- group = Costiera del Monte Marzo
