= Monte dei Corni =

Mountain in Italy

Monte dei Corni Mont-de-Corni
- Location within Alps

Highest point
- Elevation: 2,778 m (9,114 ft)
- Coordinates: 45°34′13″N 7°38′08″E

Geography
- Location: Province of Turin, Italy; Aosta Valley, Italy

Monte dei Corni (French: Mont-de-Corni) is a 2,778 m (9,114 ft) tall mountain of the Graian Alps in northern Italy. Its summit lies on the boundary between the municipalities of Pontboset in the Aosta Valley, and Valchiusa in Piedmont, Italy.

== Description ==
Monte dei Corni is the highest peak along the ridge extending between Mount Marzo (2,756 m (9,042 ft)) to the west and Mount Debat (2,622 m (8,602 ft)) to the east, which separates the Chiusella Valley in Piedmont from the Champorcher Valley in the Aosta Valley.

== SOIUSA classification ==
According to the SOIUSA (International Standardized Mountain Subdivision of the Alps) the mountain can be classified in the following way:

- main part = Western Alps
- major sector = North Western Alps
- section = Graian Alps
- subsection = Alpi del Gran Paradiso
- supergroup = Gruppo della Rosa dei Banchi
- group = Costiera del Monte Marzo
