= Traversella Mine =

Mine in Traversella, Italy

Coordinates: 45.5136°N 7.7573°E

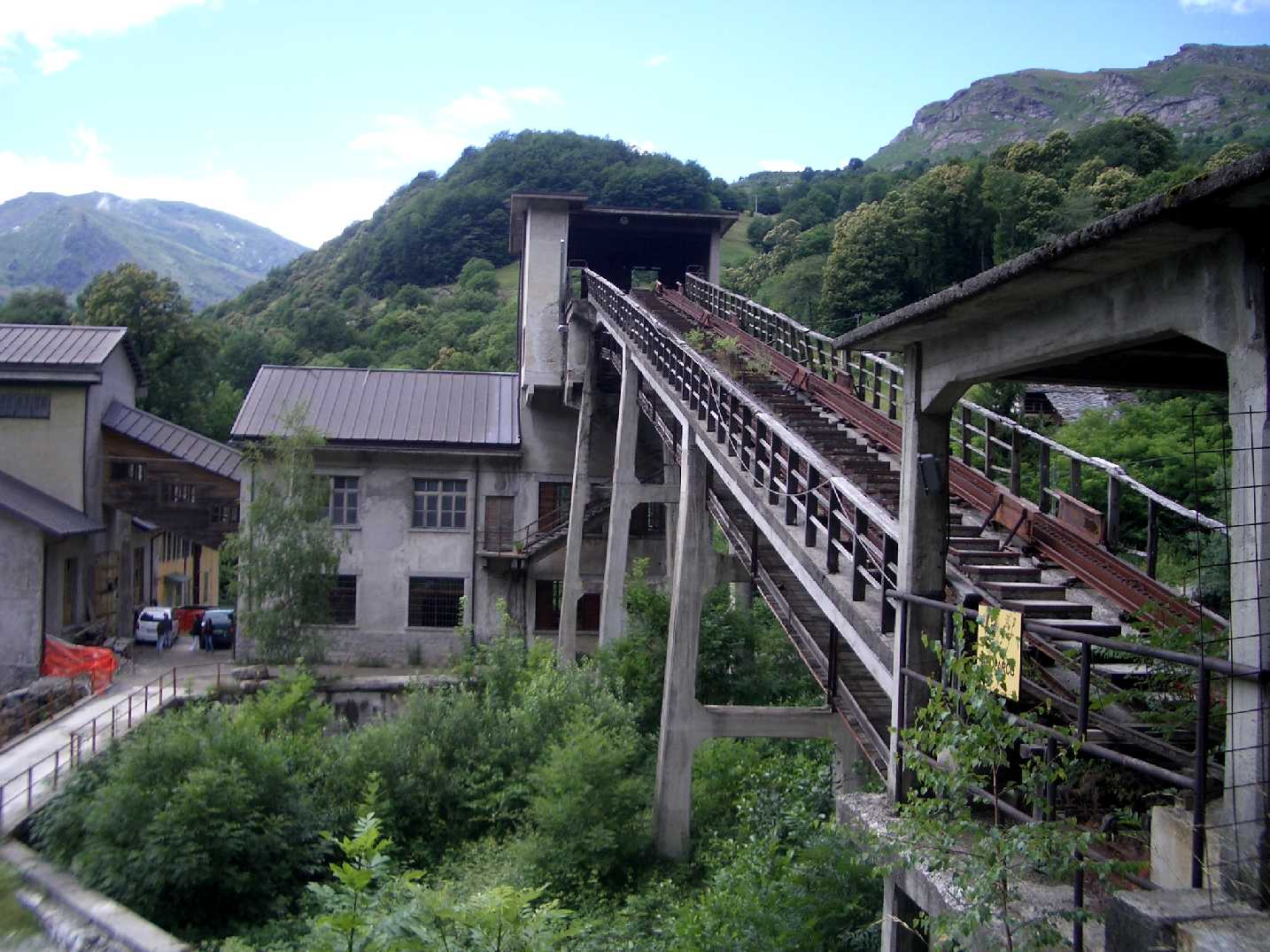
The Traversella Mine in 2005

The Traversella Mine is a mine located in Traversella, in the Chiusella Valley, in the Piedmont region of northern Italy. Exploited for the extraction of iron ores, they represented for centuries the main economic resource of the valley until their definitive closure in 1971.

== Geology ==
The Traversella ore deposits originate from the Traversella pluton, a granitoid magmatic body that intruded during the Oligocene into the rocks of the Sesia–Lanzo Unit, mainly composed of gneiss and mica schists with calcareous-dolomitic intercalations.

The high heat generated by the magmatic intrusion caused a profound transformation of the surrounding rocks: limestones were metamorphosed into saccharoidal marbles and hornfels, within which various metal mineralizations developed.

== History ==
The first to exploit the mines were the Salassi, a Celtic tribe that inhabited the Aosta Valley and the Canavese area, as suggested by traces of ancient extraction tunnels found on the rocky spur of Balma Bianca, north of the settlement of Traversella.

According to the Roman historian Livy, the consul Appius Claudius seized the Salassi mines, including those of Brosso and Phornellus-Proelim (modern-day Traversella). The iron and copper extracted were then used to equip the Roman garrisons of Eporedia and Augusta Praetoria, corresponding to the modern towns of Ivrea and Aosta.

The discovery of the main iron vein at Pian del Gallo dates back to 1716, marking the beginning of an intense phase of mining activity that lasted until the mid-19th century. During this period, mining became the main economic driver of the valley, and the population of Traversella doubled, increasing from about 1,000 to 2,000 inhabitants, a level never reached again.

However, in a context of increasing competition from imported iron and the resulting loss of competitiveness of the Italian mining sector, from 1850 onwards the Traversella Mine ceased its main activity. Only limited workings remained active in the Riondello area, where iron ore was extracted to supply the blast furnace of Pont-Saint-Martin.

Despite some attempts to resume copper extraction, the abandonment of activities continued until 1900, when the Società Anonima delle Miniere di Traversella was established, bringing together all existing concessions. The owners, Baron de Watteville, E. T. Read, and engineer Alcide Froment, who also served as mine director, initiated major works to reactivate the tunnels.

After several changes of ownership, in 1914 the operating company was absorbed by FIAT.

In the 1960s, production declined significantly, leading to the suspension of operations in 1969 and, after the dismantling of the facilities, to the definitive closure of the mine in 1971.
