= Cagnis Castle =

Castle in Piedmont, Italy

- Castello Cagnis
- Lessolo, Piedmont, Italy
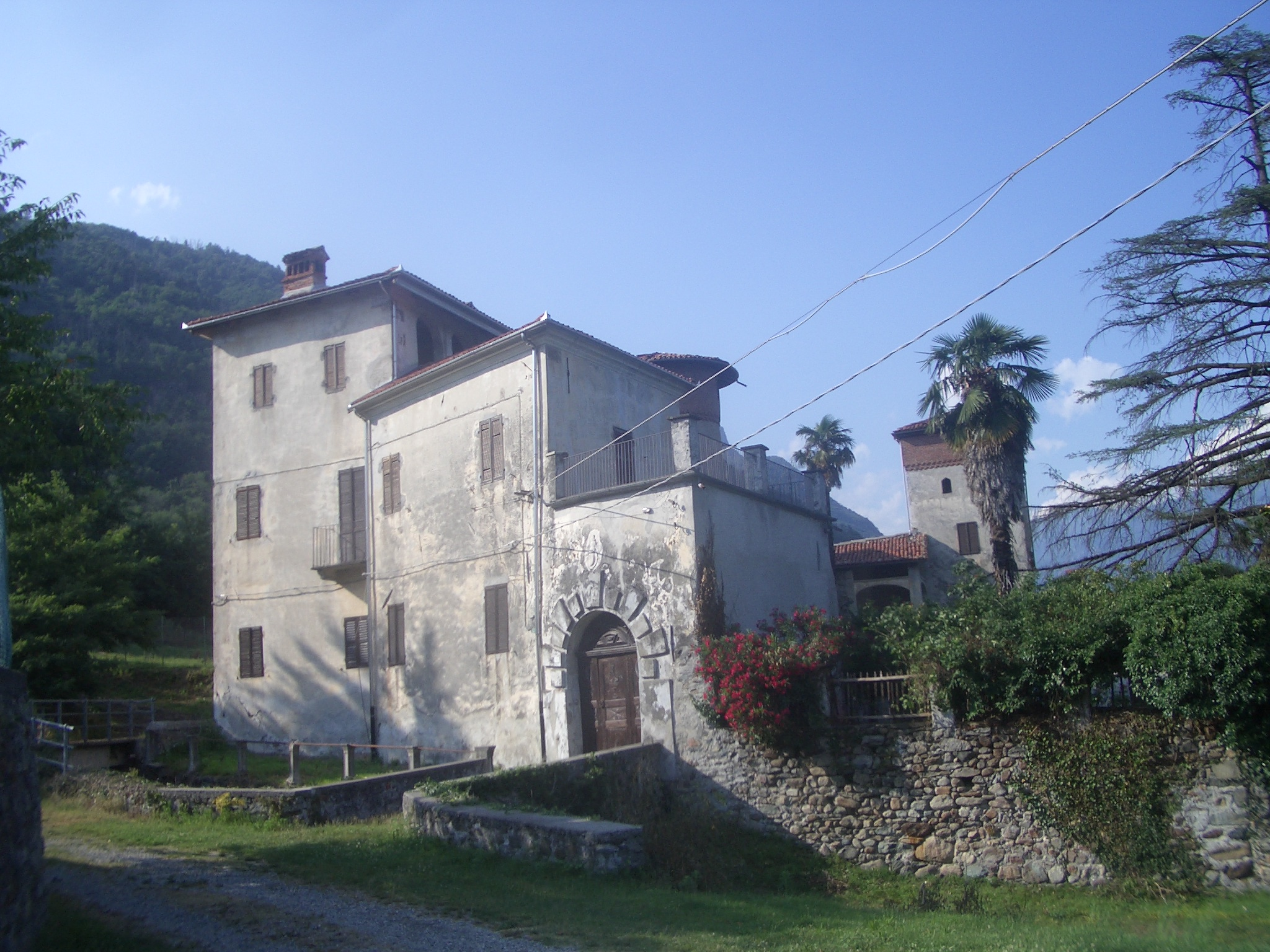
- Cagnis Castle in 2009

Site information
- Type: Castle

Location
- Coordinates: 45°28′49.44″N 7°48′43.18″E

Cagnis Castle (Italian: Castello Cagnis) is a castle located in Lessolo, Piedmont, Italy.

== History ==
The castle, already documented in the 13th century, belonged for a long time to the Counts of Castellamonte, who had jurisdiction over the town of Lessolo. In the 14th century, the original structure was destroyed during the Tuchini revolt but was later rebuilt. Over the centuries, the fortification was transformed into a baronial palace. The castle likely served as the birthplace of Francesco Ruffini.

== Description ==
The castle is distinguished by its two large towers, one square and the other cylindrical, which have survived the numerous alterations over time.
