= Fer (Dora Baltea) =

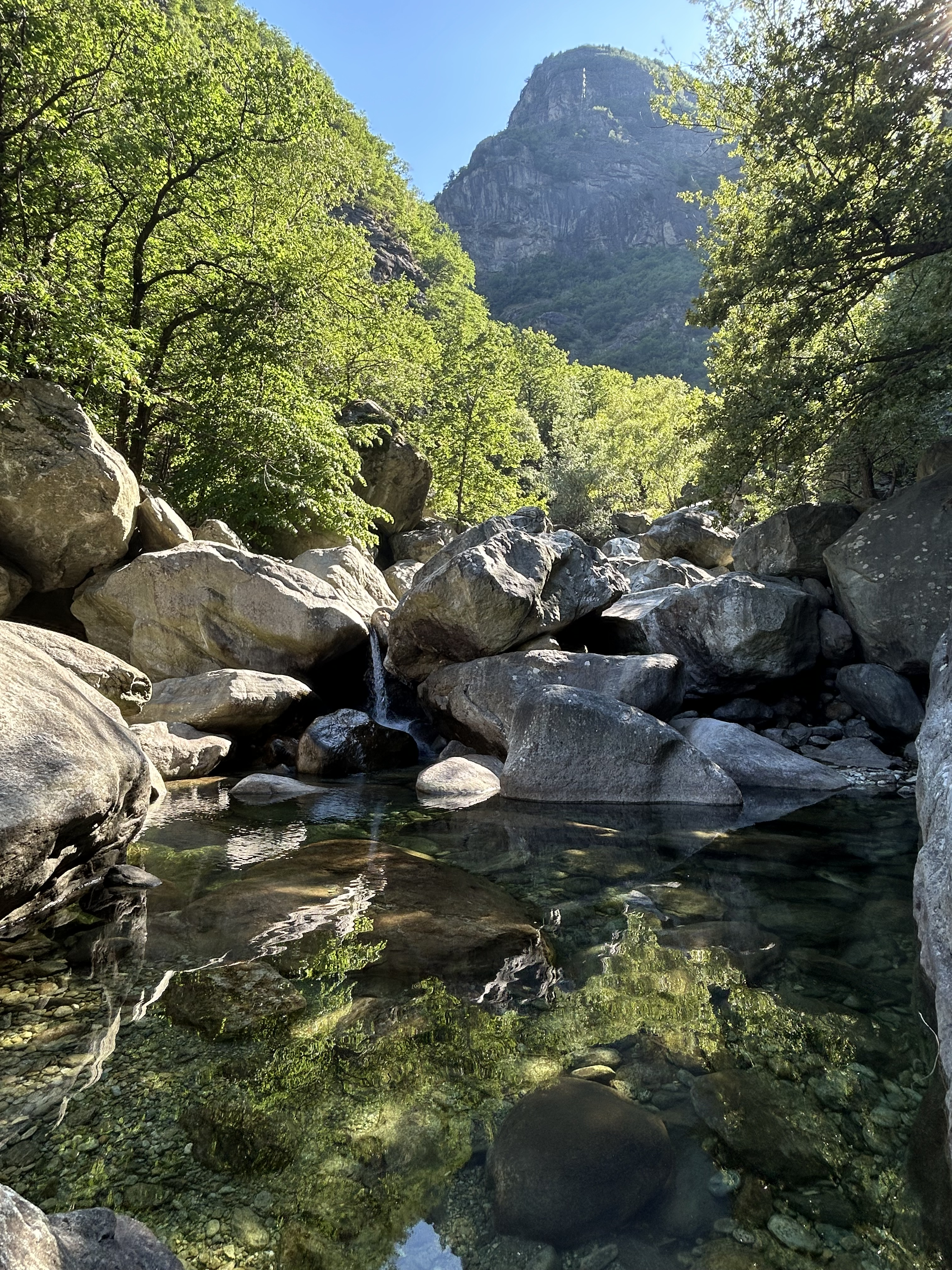

Location
- Country: Italy
- Region: Aosta Valley

Physical characteristics
- Source
  - location: Mount Debat
- Mouth: Dora Baltea
  - location: Donnas
  - coordinates: 45°36′05″N 7°45′29″E

Basin features
- Progression: Dora Baltea→ Po→ Adriatic Sea

The Fer is an Alpine stream in the Aosta Valley, Italy. A right-bank tributary of the Dora Baltea, it runs through a wild valley forming narrow gorges with waterfalls and pools.

== Origin of the name ==
The name Fer, which is the French word for "iron", is due to the iron-rich rock formations that dominate the walls of the valley through which the stream flows.

== Course ==
The stream's drainage basin extends from approximately 300 meters above sea level, near the town of Donnas, to 2,618 meters above sea level at Mount Debat. In its upper reaches, the stream is fed by two main branches: the Fer di Bonze (or Bonser) and the Fer di Moilla, named after the valleys through which they flow. The Fer joins the Dora Baltea near Donnas.

== Canyoning ==
The Fer is a popular site for canyoning and is considered the first fully equipped canyoning site in the Aosta Valley. The classic descent includes nine rope abseils, with the highest reaching 30 meters in height, as well as numerous jumps, natural water slides, and scenic pools.
