= Punta Quinseina =

Mountain in Italy

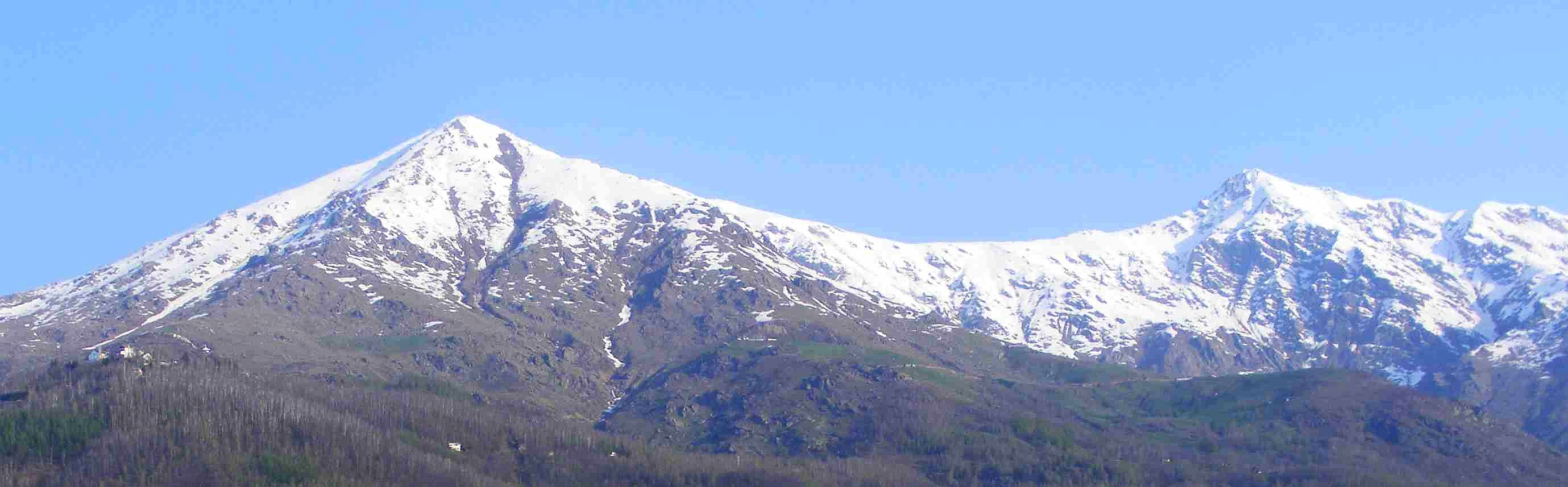
- Punta Quinseina, on the left, from Cintano

Highest point
- Elevation: 2,344 m (7,690 ft)
- Coordinates: 45°27′48″N 7°38′17″E

Geography
- Location within Alps
- Location: Piedmont, Italy

Punta Quinseina is a 2,344 m (7,690 ft) tall mountain of the Graian Alps in northern Italy. Its summit lies on the border between the municipalities of Frassinetto and Castelnuovo Nigra in Piedmont, Italy.

== Description ==
Punta Quinseina stands between the Soana Valley to the west and the Sacred Valley to the east. It forms the last significant peak along the watershed separating the Soana Valley from the Chiusella, Savenca, and Sacred valleys. To the northeast, the Quinseina is separated from Punta di Verzel (2,406 m, 7,894 ft) by the Piano dei Francesi mountain pass (2,168 m, 7,113 ft), while the ridge descends southward toward the hills of Chiesanuova and Borgiallo.

About 500 metres south of the main summit lies Punta Quinseina di Santa Elisabetta (2,231 m, 7,320 ft), named after the sanctuary at its foot. Metal crosses mark both this subsidiary summit and the main peak.

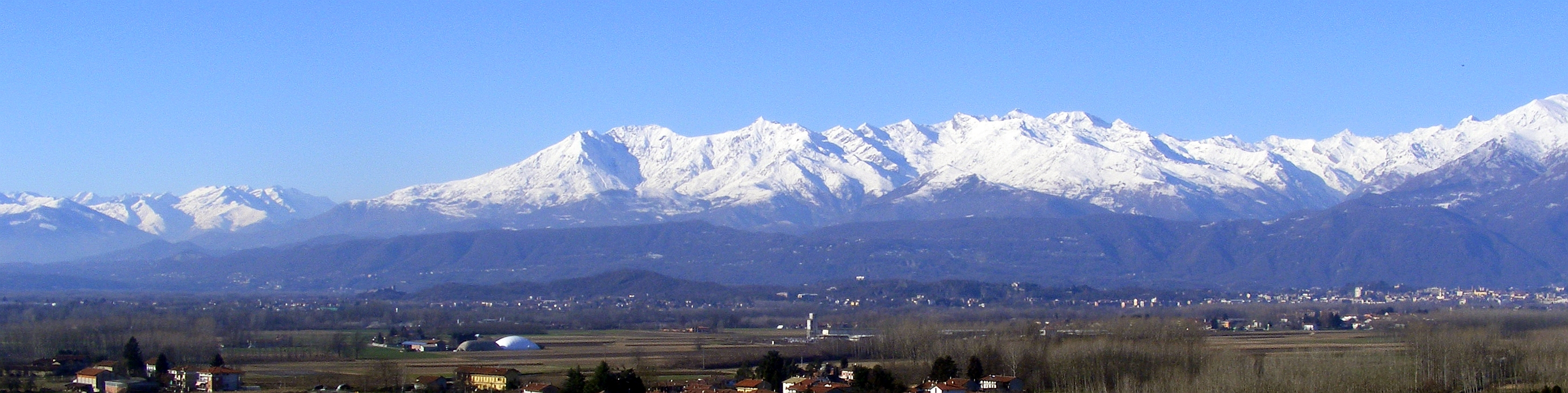
Punta Quinseina, on the left, and the "Sleeping Beauty" from Albiano d'Ivrea

Dominating the surrounding Canavese region, Punta Quinseina is visible from a great distance from the surrounding lowlands due to its prominent position. From Ivrea, its distinctive profile resembles a reclining woman, earning it the folk name "the Sleeping Beauty" (Italian: la bella addormentata or la bella dormiente).

== SOIUSA classification ==
According to the SOIUSA (International Standardized Mountain Subdivision of the Alps) the mountain can be classified in the following way:

- main part = Western Alps
- major sector = North Western Alps
- section = Graian Alps
- subsection = Alpi del Gran Paradiso
- supergroup = Gruppo della Rosa dei Banchi
- group = Costiera del Monte Giavino
