= Monfandì =

Mountain in Italy

- Location within Alps

Highest point
- Elevation: 2,820 m (9,250 ft)
- Prominence: 448 m (1,470 ft)
- Coordinates: 45°31′15″N 7°37′05″E

Geography
- Location: Province of Turin, Italy

Monfandì is a 2,820 m (9,250 ft) tall mountain of the Graian Alps in northern Italy. Its summit lies on the boundary between the municipalities of Traversella and Valprato Soana in Piedmont, Italy.

== Description ==
Monfandì is the highest peak along the ridge that, beginning at Mount Marzo (2,756 m (9,042 ft)), divides the Chiusella Valley from the Soana Valley in Piedmont. It is also the highest summit of the Chiusella Valley.

It has a prominence of 448 m (1,470 ft).

== SOIUSA classification ==
According to the SOIUSA (International Standardized Mountain Subdivision of the Alps) the mountain can be classified in the following way:

- main part = Western Alps
- major sector = North Western Alps
- section = Graian Alps
- subsection = Alpi del Gran Paradiso
- supergroup = Gruppo della Rosa dei Banchi
- group = Costiera del Monte Giavino
