= Pont-Canavese =

Pont Canavese Punt (Piedmontese) Pont (Arpitan)
- Comune
- Comune di Pont Canavese
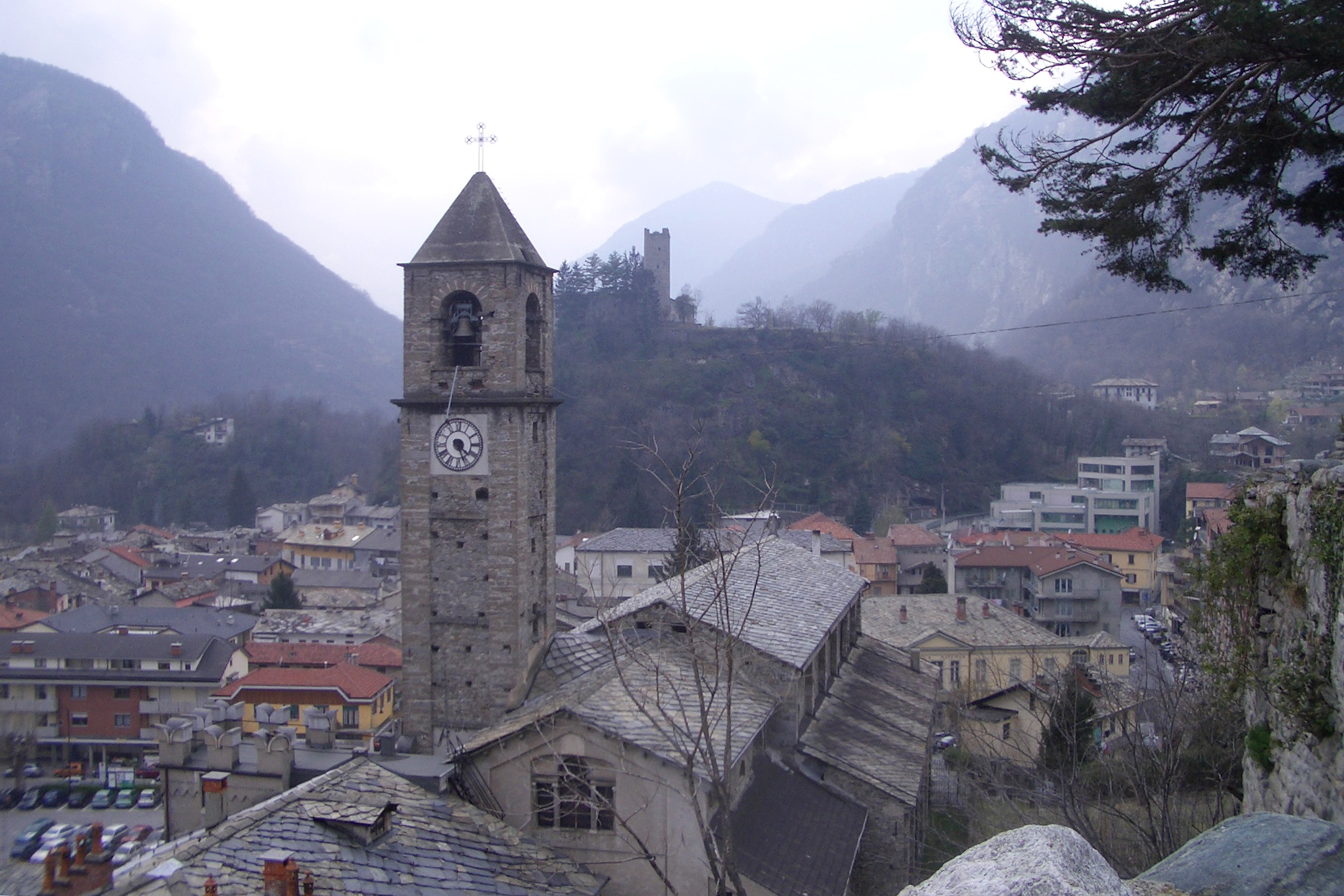

- Coat of arms

- Location within Italy Location within Piedmont
- Coordinates: 45°25′N 7°36′E
- Country: Italy
- Region: Piedmont
- Metropolitan city: Turin (TO)

Government
  - Mayor: Paolo Coppo

Area
  - Total: 19.06 km^{2} (7.36 sq mi)
- Elevation: 461 m (1,512 ft)

Population (1-1-2017)
  - Total: 3,367
  - Density: 176.7/km^{2} (457.5/sq mi)
- Demonym: Pontese(i)
- Time zone: UTC+1 (CET)
  - Summer (DST): UTC+2 (CEST)
- Postal code: 10085
- Dialing code: 0124
- Website: Official website

Pont Canavese (Piedmontese: Punt, Arpitan: Pont) is a comune (municipality) in the Metropolitan City of Turin in the Italian region Piedmont, located about 40 kilometres (25 mi) north of Turin. It occupies a small fluvial plain between the rivers Orco and Soana: its names (Pont, derived from the Latin ad duos pontes, being the Franco-Provençal word for "bridge") derives from the series of bridges that were historically built here to cross those rivers.

Pont Canavese borders the following municipalities: Ronco Canavese, Ingria, Frassinetto, Sparone, Chiesanuova, Cuorgnè and Alpette. Sights include the archaeological site of Santa Maria in Doblazio, the church of San Costanzo (1328) and a series of towers of medieval origins, once belonging to the local most powerful families.

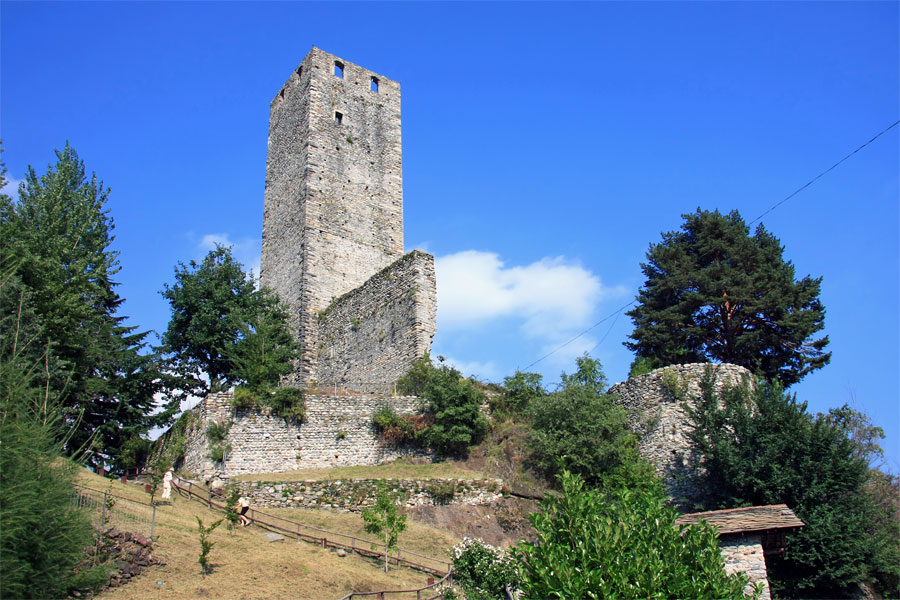
The Ferranda tower and ruins of medieval castle
