= Borgiallo =

- Comune
- Comune di Borgiallo
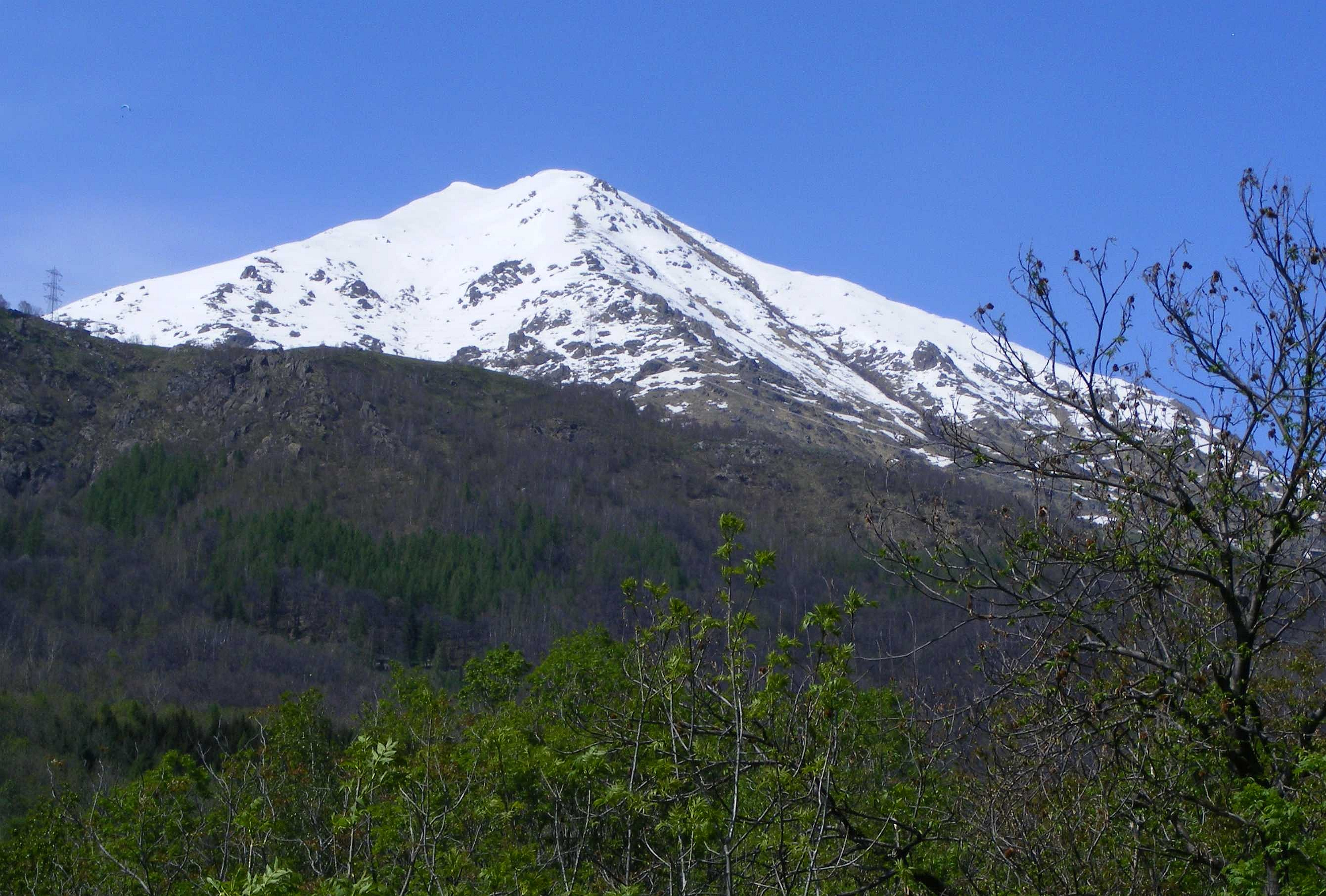
- Mount Quinseina from Borgiallo

- Coat of arms

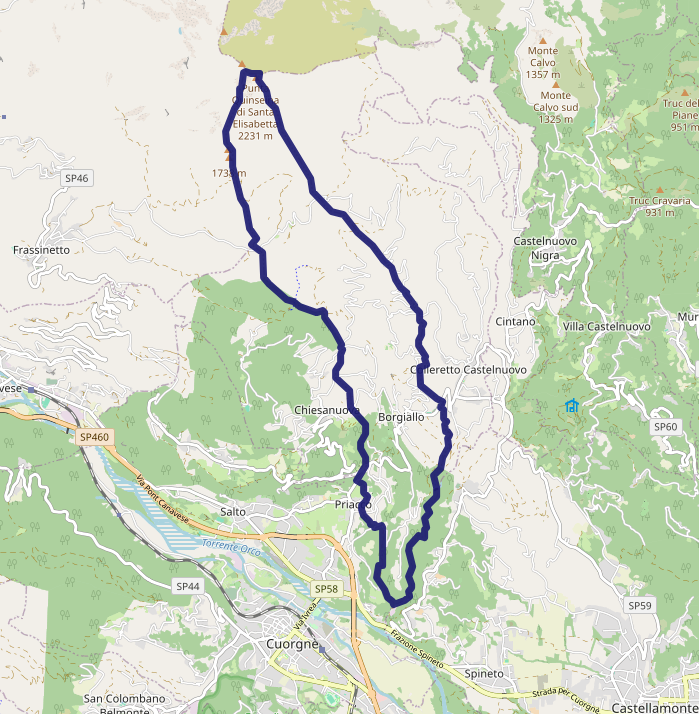

- Location within Italy Location within Piedmont
- Coordinates: 45°25′N 7°40′E
- Country: Italy
- Region: Piedmont
- Metropolitan city: Turin (TO)

Government
  - Mayor: Francesca Cargnello

Area
  - Total: 6.96 km^{2} (2.69 sq mi)

Population (1-1-2017)
  - Total: 593
  - Density: 85.2/km^{2} (221/sq mi)
- Demonym: Borgiallese(i)
- Time zone: UTC+1 (CET)
  - Summer (DST): UTC+2 (CEST)
- Postal code: 10080
- Dialing code: 0124

Borgiallo is a comune (municipality) in the Metropolitan City of Turin in the Italian region Piedmont, located about 40 kilometres (25 mi) north of Turin.

Borgiallo borders the following municipalities: Frassinetto, Castellamonte, Colleretto Castelnuovo, Castelnuovo Nigra, Chiesanuova, and Cuorgnè.

The parish church is San Nicolao.
