= San Nicolao, Borgiallo =

Church building in Borgiallo, Italy

San Nicolao is an architecture, Roman Catholic parish church located in the town of Borgiallo in the metropolitan city of Turin, region of Piedmont, Italy.

== History ==
A church at site, of medieval construction was replaced by the present church in 1863. The Romanesque architecture campanile, likely from the 11th century still remains. The stone tower has traces of mullioned windown, now closed and a closed arcade. The sober facade of the church has two heavy columns; the interior layout is of a Greek Cross, with three naves and five altars. In the choir is an altarpiece depicting Santi Nicolao e Giorgio (1834) by Giorgio Cigliana (painter).
