= Ronco Canavese =

Ronco Canavese Ronc (Piedmontese) Rounc (Arpitan)
- Comune
- Comune di Ronco Canavese
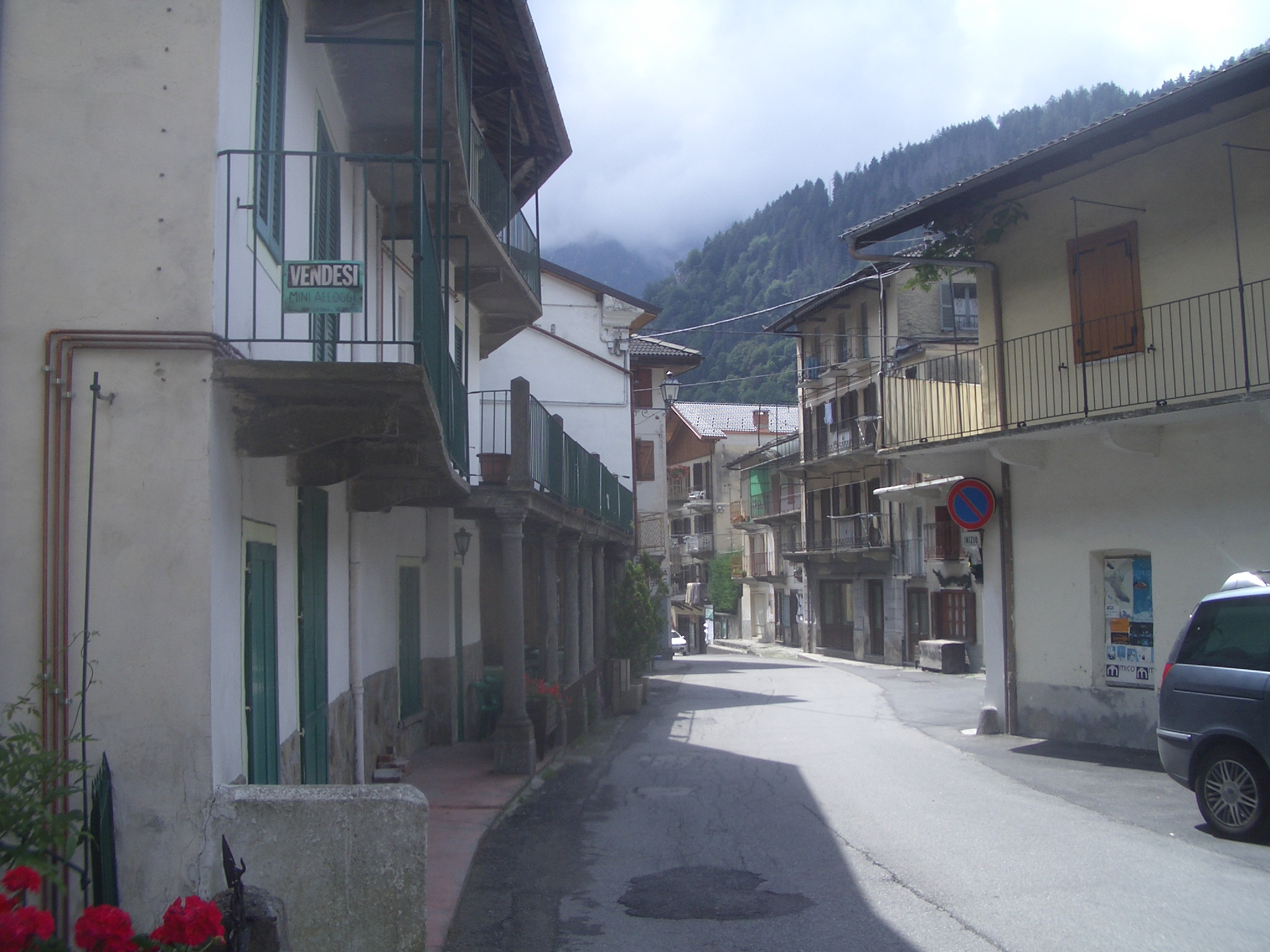

- Location within Italy Location within Piedmont
- Coordinates: 45°30′N 7°33′E
- Country: Italy
- Region: Piedmont
- Metropolitan city: Turin (TO)

Government
  - Mayor: Danilo Crosasso

Area
  - Total: 96.7 km^{2} (37.3 sq mi)
- Elevation: 956 m (3,136 ft)

Population (31 December 2010)
  - Total: 319
  - Density: 3.30/km^{2} (8.54/sq mi)
- Demonym: Ronchesi
- Time zone: UTC+1 (CET)
  - Summer (DST): UTC+2 (CEST)
- Postal code: 10080
- Dialing code: 0124

Ronco Canavese (Piedmontese: Ronc, Arpitan: Rounc) is a municipality in the Piedmont region of northwestern Italy.

== Geography ==
Ronco Canavese is located about 50 kilometers north of Turin. It lies at the center of the Soana Valley (Valle Soana), perched on one side of the Soana river and surrounded by dense forests and towering peaks. Ronco Canavese borders the municipalities OF Cogne, Valprato Soana, Traversella, Locana, Ingria, Ribordone, Pont Canavese, Convento, Bosco, and Sparone.

The village sits at about a 956-meter elevation, while its territory ranges from deep valley floors (around 774 meters) up to high alpine summits of over 3,400 meters. This dramatic terrain is part of the Graian Alps near the Gran Paradiso massif, featuring waterfalls, glacial cirques, and pristine mountain lakes. The climate is alpine, with cold, snowy winters and mild summers. The area receives abundant precipitation, including over 3 meters of snowfall annually on average.

== History ==
Ronco Canavese has medieval origins, with the first parish church established in the 13th century. In 1280, the village's parish split from the older parish of Campiglia, indicating an established community by that time. For centuries, the local economy was based on subsistence agriculture, pastoralism, and small-scale crafts. The village's copper forge at Castellaro, dating to 1675, used water power from mountain streams to produce copper and iron tools. This forge operated until 1950 and even produced materials like cookware and possibly armaments during the Napoleonic era.

Like many alpine communities, Ronco Canavese experienced waves of emigration in the 19th and 20th centuries. Many residents left seasonally or permanently to find work, notably as woodworkers and glassmakers abroad. The statues at the Santuario Madonna del Crest in the hamlet of Castellaro depict a glassblower and coppersmith under the Virgin's gaze, and inside an altar of 68 votive lights commemorates the valley men who died working in France and Switzerland.

During the 1900s, especially after World War II, depopulation accelerated as young people moved to cities for better opportunities. The valley also endured natural disasters; for example, the catastrophic floods of 1993–1994 and 2000 caused severe damage in Val Soana, washing out roads and bridges.

== Demographics ==
Ronco Canavese today is very sparsely populated, with only a few hundred residents. As of recent counts, the population is around 300–350 people, a dramatic decline from its peak a century ago. In the early 20th century, the valley was well-populated (over 3,000 inhabitants in 1911), but over the last hundred years, the resident population dropped by about 90%. This steep decline is attributed to migration and falling birth rates, leaving an aging community. Many villages and hamlets in the surrounding mountains are now only seasonally inhabited.

The population is older on average, as younger generations have largely moved to urban centers. In recent years a small uptick or stabilization has been noted due to retirees returning and some families choosing a rural lifestyle, but the community remains one of mostly seniors. Ronco has long-standing ties with French and Franco-Provençal culture, and about 13% of its registered residents are foreign nationals (chiefly French). This reflects both historical links and the influx of French holiday homeowners who reside in Ronco during summers. Efforts are underway to support the elderly population (for example, through a community nursing program for remote mountain villages)

== Economy ==
Traditional industries in Ronco Canavese were based on the valley's natural resources. For centuries, families engaged in small-scale farming and livestock raising (mainly cattle and goats), producing dairy products like alpine cheeses and cultivating hardy crops like rye and potatoes. The fast-flowing Soana stream was harnessed to power mills, sawmills, and forges.

By the 19th century, Ronco and nearby towns hosted mills and early factories that took advantage of water power. However, as the local economy modernized, many of these activities declined. Artisanal trades like wood carving, wool spinning, and cheese-making survived in reduced form, often for local use or tourism.

Today, the economy is modest and service-oriented, with an emphasis on tourism, small commerce, and environmental resources. Ronco Canavese serves as the main service center of Val Soana, despite its size. It hosts a few family-run shops, cafes, a post office, and guesthouses that cater to visitors in the summer. Tourism is a vital sector, especially in July and August, when many former residents or their descendants return for holidays and French vacationers occupy their second homes. These summer visitors boost local businesses like restaurants (which serve polenta and game), artisan markets, and guided excursions.

A few agriturismi (farm-stay bed-and-breakfasts) operate in the area. There is limited agriculture still practiced: some residents keep cattle or bees, producing niche products like mountain honey and traditional cheese for local sale. Public-sector employment (municipal administration, park rangers, etc.) also provides some jobs.

In recent years, a forward-looking initiative has been the establishment of a renewable energy cooperative: in late 2024, the valley launched Fervores (Future Renewable Energy for Orco and Soana Valleys), the first community-led renewable energy project in the Canavese area. This energy community aims to jointly produce and share sustainable power (e.g. small hydro or solar), keeping energy revenues in the local economy.

== Culture and traditions ==
The community is part of the Franco-Provençal (Arpitan) linguistic area, and an alpine dialect known as "valsoanin" is still spoken by older residents.

The patron saint of Ronco is Saint Justus (San Giusto) of Novalesa, celebrated with a big festa on the last Sunday of July each year. During the Festa di San Giusto, the village observes an outdoor Mass with processions, communal meals, music and dancing, and reunions of families. Many expatriates plan their visits to coincide with this event. Earlier in July, the hamlet of Boschettiera hosts the Festa del Pane (Bread Festival) at its centuries-old community oven, which was originally built for communal baking. Every first Sunday of July, villagers fire up the oven and reenact the old tradition of mixing, leavening, and baking bread together. This festival, started in 1998, has become a way to honor the valley's rural heritage, with locals and visitors gathering to make bread, share folk recipes, and celebrate around the oven's warmth.

Mountain folklore about the "masche" (mysterious witches or spirits of Piedmontese legend) is celebrated in night hikes and story-telling events under the stars. For instance, an annual guided excursion to Pian delle Masche invites participants to dine on polenta, local meats, and cheeses at a high pasture, then dance “with the masche” in a playful homage to local legends.

Throughout Val Soana, many small chapels and shrines dot the hamlets. Some of these have their own feast days or processions. In winter, when heavy snow isolates the valley, cultural life turns inward: families maintain the custom of gathering to tell stories in the dialect, play cards, and prepare traditional foods like bagna cauda (warm garlic–anchovy dip) or hearty stews. Staples include polenta (often served with wild game or local cheese), rye bread, cured meats, and soups with beans or cabbage. Chestnuts were historically important (ground into flour or roasted) and are still used in local dishes and desserts. A few artisans maintain old trades, like making wooden sabots (clogs) or weaving fabrics from wool.

=== Visual and cultural resources ===
In the 19th century, the Fucina del Rame, a late 17th-century copper forge at the hamlet of Castellaro, was able to produce up to 1,800 copper vessels a day at its peak.

With the support of Gran Paradiso National Park and funding from the Compagnia di San Paolo, the forge was restored and reopened to the public in 2023 as the Ecomuseo del Rame (Copper Ecomuseum) after a period of closure for structural restoration, notably a new roof. It now offers an experiential museum where visitors can learn about traditional copper working, an activity that was once central to Ronco's economy. Exhibits include the original water-powered machinery; park guides demonstrate how water turning a wheel could drive large hammers (magli) to beat hot copper. The ecomuseum also runs hands-on workshops where visitors can try copper-smithing techniques and crafts.

=== Folklore ===
==== Saint Besso ====
The Sanctuary of San Besso clings to the foot of a sheer rock face at 2,019 meters, where according to legend, the saint's fall left an imprint in the stone. The tale recounts that Saint Besso, a Roman legionary of the Theban Legion, fled to these highlands to escape persecution. At the site where the sanctuary now stands (perched dramatically under a towering cliff), Besso was martyred. Some versions say he was thrown against the rock, miraculously leaving a footprint or mark in the stone which is venerated as a sign of the saint's presence.

For centuries, Val Soana locals and people from the Aosta Valley (notably Cogne) have journeyed to this sanctuary for an annual pilgrimage. The main feast occurs on August 10th each year (with a secondary one on December 1st), when crowds from both sides of the mountain climb 700 m up from Campiglia Soana, converging at the chapel in a festival of faith and folklore. It is a day of outdoor Mass, traditional music, and communal meals, and often villagers attend dressed in their old costumes, carrying banners.

==== Great Monday ====
Lo Gran Dilun de Ronc, literally the Great Monday of Ronco, was an old village festival celebrated on the Monday after Pentecost (the "big Monday" following Whitsunday) that had fallen out of practice in the late 20th century. In 2022, community leaders and the local Pro Loco decided to bring back Lo Gran Dilun, turning it into an annual event once more. The festival's revival has been a success: for example, in May 2023 the day-long celebration included a well-attended Mass at the parish church of San Giusto and festivities where residents from all the frazioni (hamlets) came together. Many participants donned costumi caratteristici della Valle Soana – the traditional valley costumes.

According to the mayor's statements and local news coverage, the goal of resurrecting Lo Gran Dilun is to create a new occasion for social cohesion and to ensure that ancient communal celebrations "never fade from memory".

== Sports ==
=== Historical Alpine sports and traditions ===
Sports and outdoor pursuits have deep roots in Ronco Canavese's alpine culture. In the late 19th and early 20th centuries, mountaineering gained popularity as explorers and locals alike tackled the surrounding peaks (the Torre di Lavina at 3,308 m was already noted as “the most beautiful summit of Val Soana” by 1920). Winter pastimes included informal skiing and scialpinismo (ski mountaineering) on local slopes before modern lifts existed. Traditional village games were also important social activities; bocce (boules) has long been a favorite in Ronco's piazzas. This pastime continues today. In 2022, the town inaugurated a new pétanque court at its sports ground to support local boules players.

=== Local sports facilities and activities ===
The main municipal sports area in Via Valprato (on the edge of the village) includes a small multi-purpose field and courts for several sports: a five-a-side football (calcetto) pitch, a tennis and volleyball court, a beach volleyball sand court, and the newly built pétanque/bocce terrain. In 2022, the town added the dedicated petanque court and announced plans to upgrade the whole complex (including the beach volley, tennis, and calcetto fields) with new surfaces and lighting. These facilities are open to residents and visitors and see the most use in summer, when many former residents return on holiday. Pick-up football matches and bocce games are common, and children make use of the playgrounds and open spaces for outdoor play.

Every August, the community comes together for a five-a-side football tournament under the stars. For example, on 16 August 2024, Ronco hosted an evening calcetto tournament on the town field, open to all youth 14 and older, with 4 vs 4 matches and teams drawn on the spot. A small entry fee per team is collected. In addition to this annual tournament, the village Pro Loco (community club) integrates sports into local festivals. During the mid-August Ferragosto celebrations, the town organizes various sporting games: past programs have featured children's races and sack-toss games, women's football matches (e.g. an Italy vs. France friendly), the "scapoli vs. ammogliati" match between unmarried and married men, and mixed-gender volleyball tournaments on the outdoor court.

=== Outdoor recreation and alpine sports ===
The village lies on the route of the long-distance Grande Traversata delle Alpi (GTA), serving as a stopping point for trekkers crossing the Piedmont Alps. From Ronco's center (956 m) and its dozens of hamlets, marked trails lead to high pastures, alpine lakes, and mountain summits in every direction. In the adjacent Vallone di Forzo, a side valley within Ronco's territory, hikers can stroll to abandoned villages or undertake ascents of peaks and glaciers.

Notable climbs include the Torre di Lavina (3,308 m) and the Ciardoney Glacier, both accessible via routes starting near Ronco. Ronco and the nearby hamlet of Piamprato also serve as staging points on the Grande Traversata del Gran Paradiso, a regional hiking loop. Park authorities and local guides offer guided excursions in summer. In winter, park guides or local associations organize snowshoe treks (ciaspolate) through the snowy forests.

The rugged Soana and Forzo torrents allow seasonal kayaking and canoeing, and some sections of canyon have been used for canyoning descents. In cold winters, climbers can take on ice-climbing routes on frozen waterfalls in the valley (several ice falls are known training spots for climbers in Piedmont). Sport climbing on rock is also practiced in the area, and a small indoor climbing wall is available in a neighboring town for off-season training.

Mountain biking has seen growth thanks to new infrastructure: in 2017 a downhill MTB park opened at Piamprato (the upper valley, a few kilometers from Ronco), reactivating a long-defunct chairlift to serve bike trails. This Piamprato Bike Park offers lift-served downhill tracks, the first of their kind in Canavese, and operates in summer out of the local ski area.

=== Events and sports tourism ===
In the warmer months, trail running competitions take advantage of the valley's steep terrain and footpaths. These include:

- The Ronco–Nivolastro Vertical Run, a short but strenuous uphill race (2.5 km with ~450 m of elevation gain) that has been part of the “Valle Soana Trail Circus” series. In its 2024 edition, despite a summer thunderstorm delaying the start, the Ronco–Nivolastro race still saw a strong turnout of competitors setting off from the town center.
- The Trail 827, named for the altitude of the village of Ingria (827 m). This event, held on Easter Monday, runs from Ingria to Ronco and back via mountain mule tracks connecting alpine hamlets. The Trail 827 is part of the Canavese UISP trail-running championship and is organized in collaboration with Ingria's municipality.

During summer fêtes, the Pro Loco organizes tournaments (football, volleyball, children's games) to entertain residents and visitors. In winter, a popular community event is the Ciaspolenta, which combines a group snowshoe hike with a communal polenta lunch. For instance, in February 2025, a ciaspolata trek was held to Pian dell'Azaria (1,650 m) in Gran Paradiso Park, followed by a polenta feast; the route led participants through an alpine landscape described by writer Mario Rigoni Stern as "one of the most beautiful places in the world".

Increasingly, sports-based tourism is seen as a strategy for the valley's economic and social revitalization. In 2018, a group of seven local young people, with support from the municipality, leased a pristine stretch of the Torrente Forzo to establish a regulated angling reserve on the Soana's tributary stream in Forzo. The idea was "to leverage what the territory offers – even the streams – to boost tourism and give lifeblood to a valley at risk of depopulation". The reserve, managed by the amateur association Li Fòsatin (formed by families and youth of Val Forzo), has been successful: on opening day, it drew fishermen from all over Piedmont, as well as from Lombardy and Liguria. Li Fòsatin is also known for organizing the valley's annual beer fest. In a press interview, the project's founders explained that their goal was both to share their passion for fishing and to "make the reserve a real tourist resource within the valley's outdoor activities", while also giving locals an "excuse to get together one more time than usual" through sport.

== Tourism and attractions ==
=== Historic churches and shrines ===
Founded in medieval times (independent since 1280) and later rebuilt in the 1800s, the Parish Church of San Giusto Martire in the main village features traditional stone architecture with a stone-column portico and lòsè roof (stone slab roofing typical of alpine buildings). In the locality of Castellaro, the Santuario Madonna del Crest, dedicated to Our Lady of the Snows and to emigrants, has a dramatic outdoor sculpture tableau: the Virgin Mary with outstretched arms watches over a glassblower and a coppersmith at work, while a mourning woman in Val Soana folk dress kneels beside them. Carved around are the tools of bygone local trades (farming, craftsmanship, mining), and inside the sanctuary, an altar with 68 small lights honors each emigrant glassworker from the valley who lost his life abroad. Scattered in the surrounding hamlets are several chapels, such as the 17th-century Chiesa di San Rocco in a forest clearing, or the tiny chapel of San Grato in Nivolastro), each with their own history and often open to visitors during the summer festivals.

=== Gran Paradiso National Park ===
Ronco Canavese lies on the Piedmont side of the Gran Paradiso National Park (Parco Nazionale del Gran Paradiso), Italy's oldest national park. A large portion of the commune's territory falls within this protected area. Popular hikes include routes to the Lasinetto Valley (with the pretty green Lago Lasin), the Forzo Valley (a wild side valley rich in waterfalls), and higher ascents like the trail towards Cima Rosta (a panoramic peak ~2,700 m overlooking the valley).

Wildlife watching is a major draw: the park is home to Alpine ibex, chamois, marmots, and golden eagles, and it's not uncommon to spot these animals in the upper Val Soana. In Ronco's main village, the National Park authority operates a visitors' center titled "Traditions and Biodiversity in a Fantastic Valley".

=== Natural landmarks ===
Near the village entrance in Castellaro, the Soana stream has carved the Marmitte dei Giganti (Giants’ Kettles) – smooth cylindrical potholes in the rock formed by glacial meltwaters. These rock pools and chutes create little waterfalls, especially in spring. It is close to the Fucina del Rame. Guided tours or informational panels describe the forge's operation and its importance to the community. For panoramic views, visitors can hike or drive to the upper hamlets like Convento, Bosco or Forzo. Above the hamlet of Pezzetto, a short trail leads to the Ponte degli Innamorati (Lovers’ Bridge), a wooden footbridge with a heart-shaped art installation.

=== Infrastructure and transportation ===
Reaching and moving around Ronco Canavese involves mountain roads but is manageable with planning. The village is connected to the rest of Piedmont by the Provincial Road that winds up the Soana Valley from Pont Canavese (the gateway town where the Soana stream meets the larger Orco Valley). From Turin or Ivrea, drivers typically reach Pont Canavese and then follow about 20 kilometers of winding road climbing north to Ronco. The road is paved and maintained year-round, but can be snowy or icy in the winter, sometimes requiring tire chains.

Public transportation is limited but exists: one can take a train or bus from Turin to Pont Canavese (Pont is served by the Canavesana railway and regional buses). From Pont Canavese, a regional bus service runs up the Soana Valley to Ronco Canavese. This bus operates year-round with a few trips per day (more in summer). In the peak summer months, the bus route may extend beyond Ronco to higher hamlets such as Valprato and Piamprato for hikers, while in winter, the terminus is usually Ronco. There is no railway directly to Ronco, and the nearest highway exit is many kilometers away.

In terms of services, Ronco has its essential municipal facilities concentrated around its small center. The Town Hall (Municipio) is on the main street and houses administrative offices for civil services. There is a postal office, a pharmacy, and a primary health outpost (for basic medical consultations), but hospital services are located in larger towns (the closest hospital is in Ivrea, about 40 kilometers away).

Recognizing the challenges of an elderly, dispersed population, the pilot project P.A.S.S.I. Montani provides community nursing: professional nurses periodically visit Ronco and its frazioni to offer in-home healthcare and check-ups for the elderly. This service helps residents who cannot easily travel to distant clinics. The village also has a primary school, although with very few children, classes have at times been combined or held in neighboring towns if student numbers are too low. For higher education (middle/high school), students commute to larger towns (with weekly boarding or daily bus rides).

== Local government ==
Ronco Canavese is an independent comune (municipality), though it collaborates closely with neighboring villages due to its small size. It is part of the Metropolitan City of Turin. Since 2010, it has been grouped in the Unione Montana Valli Orco e Soana (a mountain municipalities union) which coordinates resources and services across the Orco and Soana valleys.

The municipal government is led by a mayor (Sindaco) and a small council. As of the latest elections in 2021, the mayor of Ronco Canavese is Lorenzo Giacomino, who succeeded long-time mayor Danilo Crosasso. The local administration handles typical duties like maintaining roads, managing waste collection, and promoting tourism, albeit with a tiny staff. Given limited tax revenue from the small population, the town benefits from regional and EU rural development funds for many projects, such as infrastructure upgrades and cultural preservation.

Ronco was formerly part of the now-defunct Comunità Montana Alto Canavese and continues those cooperative efforts through the new Unione Montana, which has offices in Pont Canavese and supports economic and social initiatives in the valley.

The commune operates a civic library (recently rejuvenated as the Maria Ida Viglino Library), which was reopened as a community project to serve as a cultural hub with books, internet access, and a venue for workshops. There is also a small multi-purpose hall and theater (Don Lorenzo Babando Hall) used for community meetings, film screenings, and the occasional theatrical performance, often involving local amateur groups or schoolchildren.

Emergency services (fire brigade, mountain rescue) are coordinated with nearby towns; a volunteer fire station exists in the valley and the Alpine rescue service covers hiking emergencies via a base in Cogne or Locana. Policing is handled by the Carabinieri station in Pont Canavese, though Ronco itself is very peaceful with a low crime rate. Ronco Canavese participates in the Green Community Sinergie in Canavese, a program for ecological transition in the Canavese mountain areas. Started in 2022 and backed by national recovery funds, this project unites several upland communes (including Ronco) to develop sustainable management of resources, renewable energy, eco-tourism, and forest conservation. Under this umbrella, the Fervores energy community was established. It is the first renewable energy community in the Canavese valleys where local institutions and citizens co-own renewable energy production and share the benefits.

The foundation for Fervores was formed in December 2024 and is headquartered at the Unione Montana offices. Additionally, the municipality has invested in improving connectivity (as noted, fiber broadband) and supporting small entrepreneurship. Social services like elderly care, disability assistance, and youth recreation are coordinated at the inter-municipal level.
