= Quassolo =

- Comune
- Comune di Quassolo
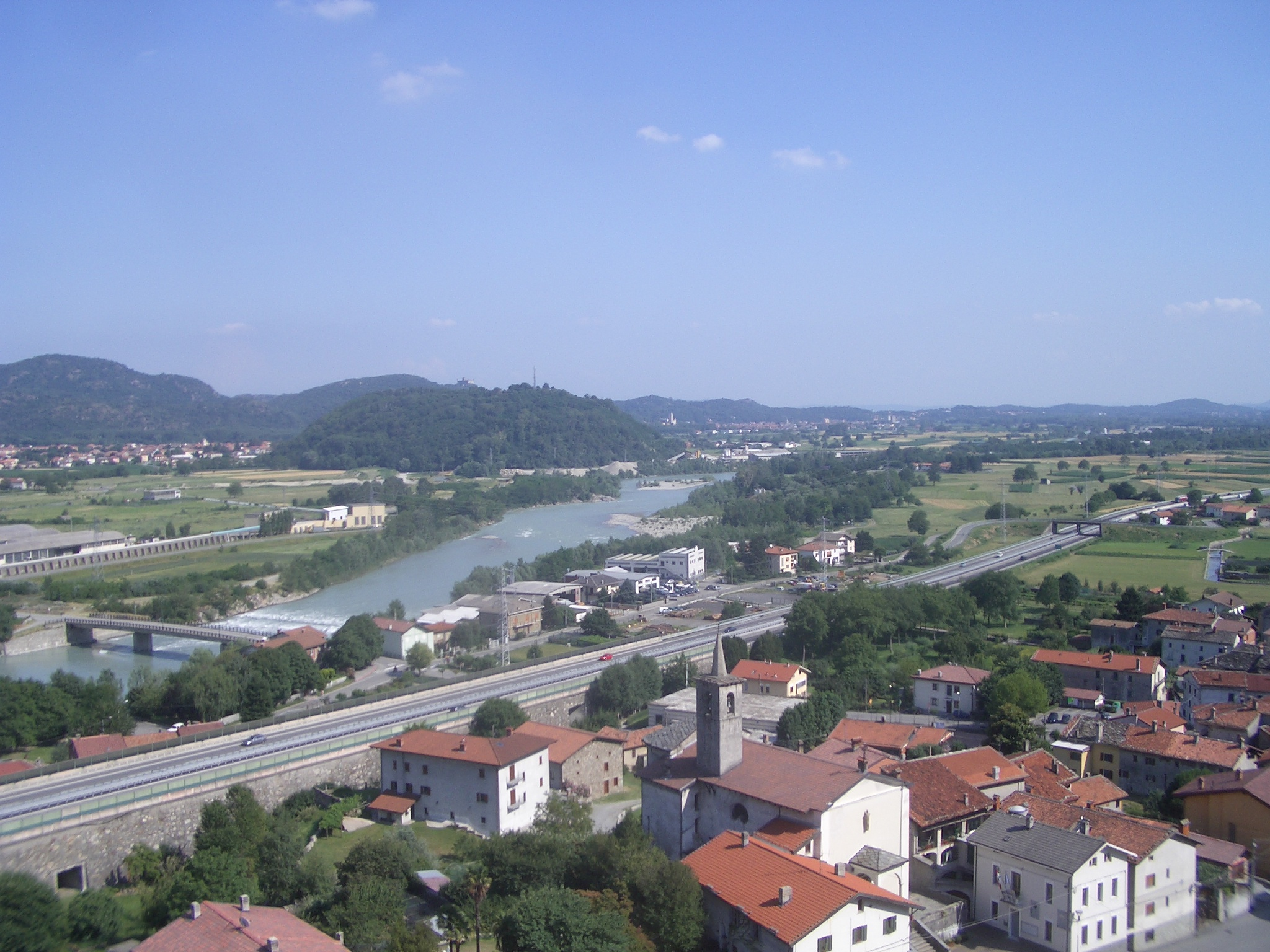

- Location within Italy Location within Piedmont
- Coordinates: 45°32′N 7°50′E
- Country: Italy
- Region: Piedmont
- Metropolitan city: Turin (TO)

Area
  - Total: 3.9 km^{2} (1.5 sq mi)
- Elevation: 275 m (902 ft)

Population (31 December 2010)
  - Total: 370
  - Density: 95/km^{2} (250/sq mi)
- Demonym: Quassolesi
- Time zone: UTC+1 (CET)
  - Summer (DST): UTC+2 (CEST)
- Postal code: 10010
- Dialing code: 0125
- Website: Official website

Quassolo is a comune (municipality) in the Metropolitan City of Turin in the Italian region Piedmont, located about 50 kilometres (31 mi) north of Turin.

Quassolo borders the following municipalities: Settimo Vittone, Tavagnasco, Brosso, and Borgofranco d'Ivrea.
