= Mount Rafrey =

Mountain in Italy

- Location within Alps

Highest point
- Elevation: 3,146 m (10,322 ft)
- Coordinates: 45°38′51″N 7°30′41″E

Geography
- Location: Aosta Valley, Italy

Mount Rafrey (Italian: Monte Rafrey, French: Mont Rafrey) is a 3,146 m (10,322 ft) tall mountain of the Graian Alps in northern Italy. Its summit lies in the municipality of Fénis in the Aosta Valley, Italy.

== Description ==
Mount Rafrey stands along the ridge that, extending southeast, culminates at Mont Glacier (3,185 m (10,449 ft)), forming the divide between Val Clavalité and the Savoney Valley, one of its side valleys.

== SOIUSA classification ==
According to the SOIUSA (International Standardized Mountain Subdivision of the Alps) the mountain can be classified in the following way:

- main part = Western Alps
- major sector = North Western Alps
- section = Graian Alps
- subsection = Alpi del Gran Paradiso
- supergroup = Catena Emilius-Tersiva
- group = Gruppo Glacier-Avic

== Ascent ==
Mount Rafrey is most commonly climbed via the Col d'Etzely, either by ascending through Val Clavalité or by starting from the Champorcher Valley and crossing Col Fussy.
