= Fondo Bridge =

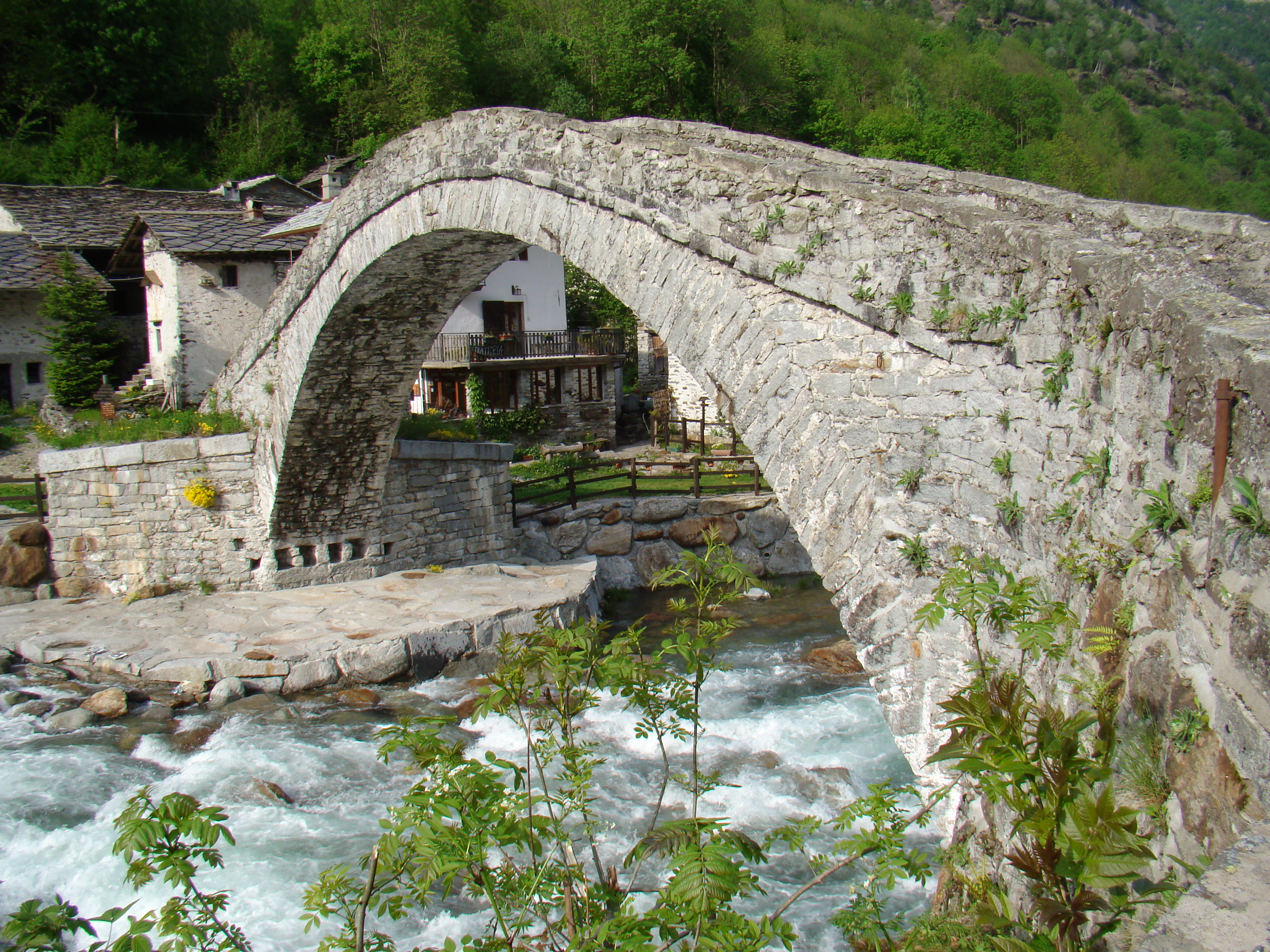
- Coordinates: 45.5314°N 7.6861°E
- Crosses: Chiusella
- Locale: Traversella, Italy

Characteristics
- Design: stone humpbacked arch bridge

The Fondo Bridge (Italian: Ponte di Fondo) is a stone arch bridge over the Chiusella located in Fondo in Traversella, Italy.

== History ==
The bridge was built in 1727 on the ruins of an older bridge, which had been destroyed during a flood that also swept away the village church.

== Description ==
The bridge features a symmetrical, single large arch humpback design.
