= Tavagnasco =

- Comune
- Comune di Tavagnasco
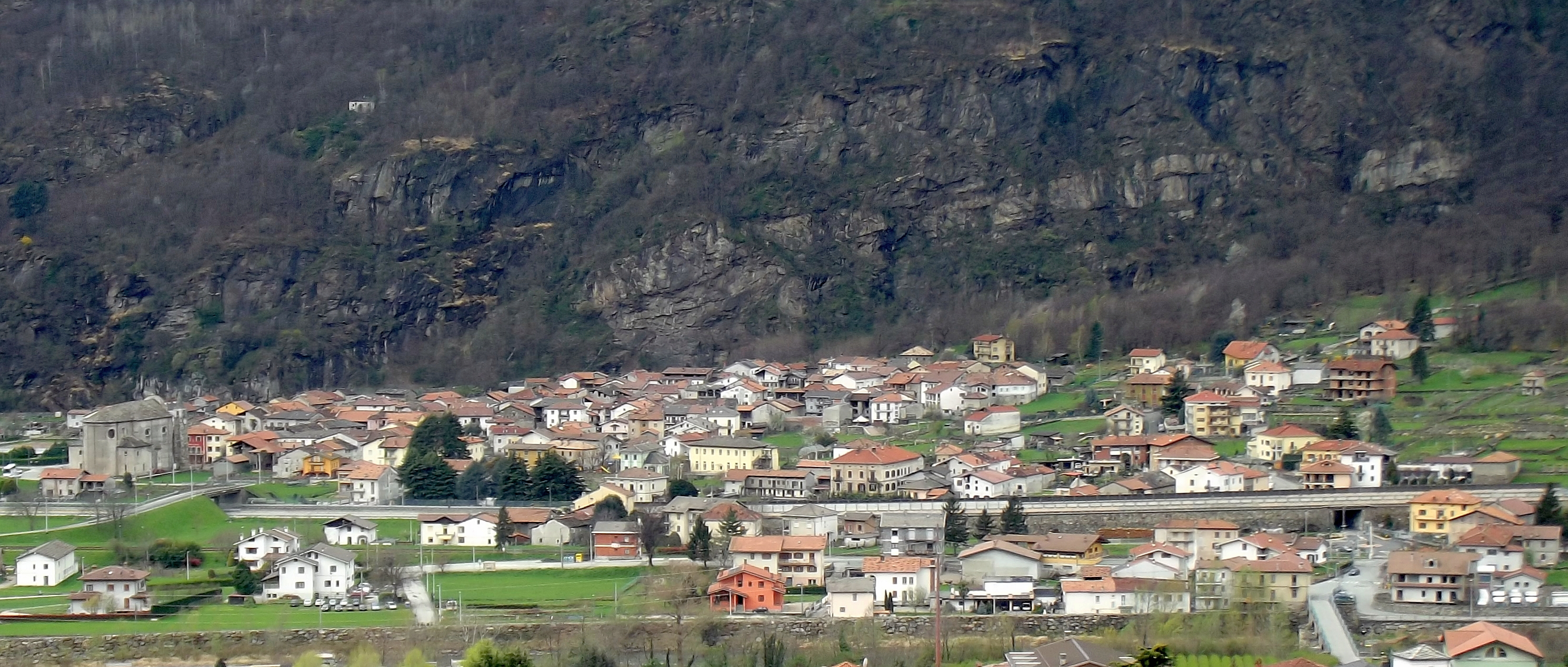
- A view of the town from Pieve San Lorenzo

- Location within Italy Location within Piedmont
- Coordinates: 45°33′N 7°49′E
- Country: Italy
- Region: Piedmont
- Metropolitan city: Turin (TO)

Government
  - Mayor: Giovanni Franchino

Area
  - Total: 8.6 km^{2} (3.3 sq mi)
- Elevation: 270 m (890 ft)

Population (30 September 2012)
  - Total: 794
  - Density: 92/km^{2} (240/sq mi)
- Demonym: Tavagnaschesi
- Time zone: UTC+1 (CET)
  - Summer (DST): UTC+2 (CEST)
- Postal code: 10010
- Dialing code: 0125
- Website: Official website

Tavagnasco is a comune (municipality) in the Metropolitan City of Turin in the Italian region Piedmont, located about 50 kilometres (31 mi) north of Turin.

Tavagnasco borders the following municipalities: Settimo Vittone, Quincinetto, Traversella, Brosso, and Quassolo.
