= Chiesanuova, Piedmont =

Chiesanuova
- Comune
- Comune di Chiesanuova
- Flag

- Location within Italy Location within Piedmont
- Coordinates: 45°25′N 7°39′E
- Country: Italy
- Region: Piedmont
- Metropolitan city: Turin (TO)

Government
  - Mayor: Giovanni Giachino

Area
  - Total: 4.0 km^{2} (1.5 sq mi)
- Elevation: 664 m (2,178 ft)

Population (1-1-2017)
  - Total: 233
  - Density: 58/km^{2} (150/sq mi)
- Demonym: Chiesanuovese(i)
- Time zone: UTC+1 (CET)
  - Summer (DST): UTC+2 (CEST)
- Postal code: 10080
- Dialing code: 0124

Chiesanuova is a comune (municipality) in the Metropolitan City of Turin in the Italian region Piedmont, located about 40 kilometres (25 mi) north of Turin.

Chiesanuova borders the following municipalities: Frassinetto, Pont Canavese, Borgiallo, and Cuorgnè.
