= Ingria, Piedmont =

Ingria L'Ingri (Piedmontese) L'Éngri (Arpitan)
- Comune
- Comune di Ingria
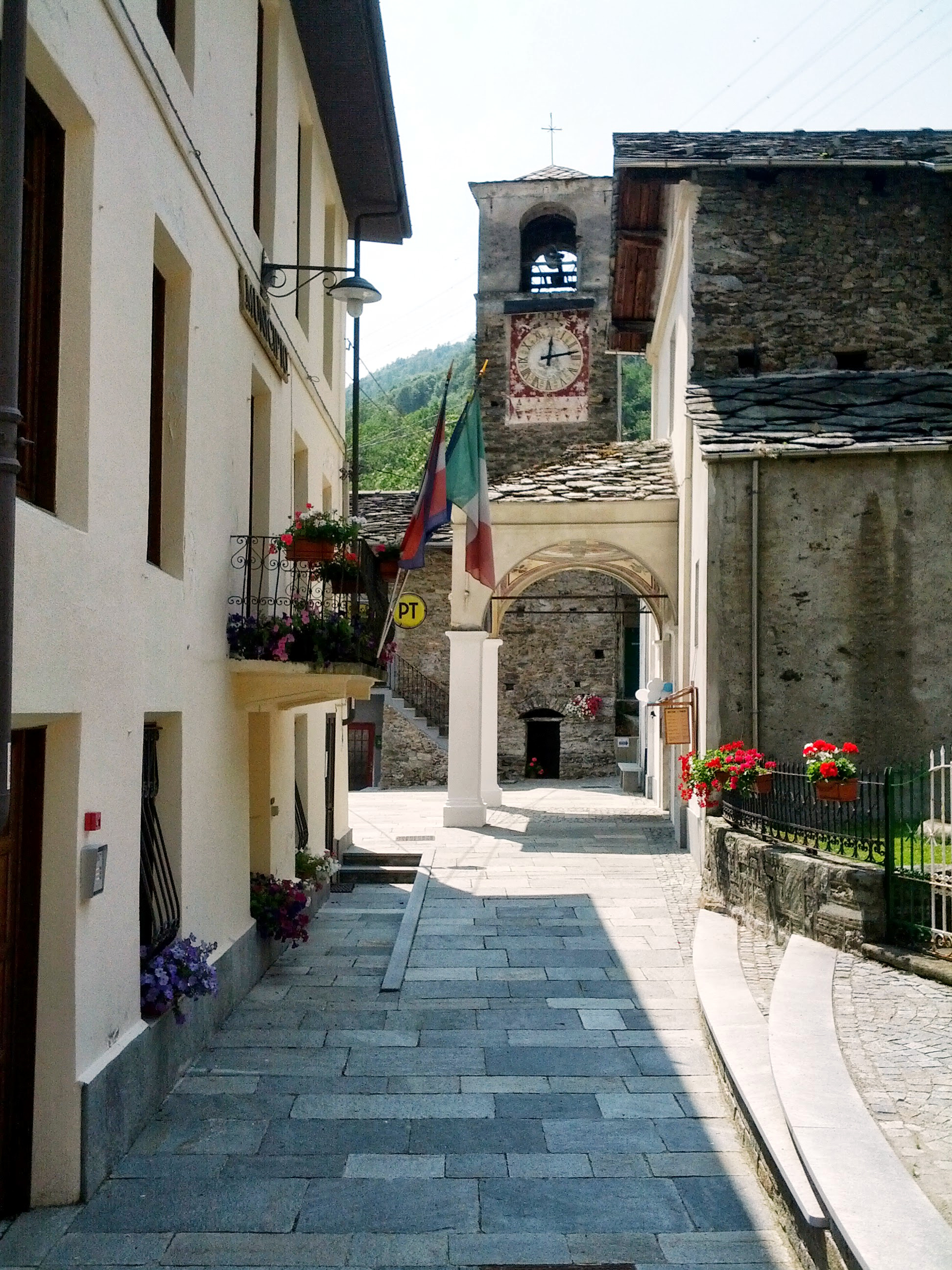

- Coat of arms

- Location within Italy Location within Piedmont
- Coordinates: 45°28′N 7°34′E
- Country: Italy
- Region: Piedmont
- Metropolitan city: Turin (TO)
- Frazioni: Albaretto, Albera, Arcavut, Bech, Beirasso, Belvedere, Bettassa, Borgognone, Camprovardo, Cavagnole, Ciuccia, Fenoglia, Ghiaire, Mombianco, Monteu, Querio, Reverso, Rivoira, Salsa, Villanuova, Viretto

Government
  - Mayor: Igor De Santis

Area
  - Total: 14.75 km^{2} (5.70 sq mi)

Population (1-1-2017)
  - Total: 47
  - Density: 3.2/km^{2} (8.3/sq mi)
- Demonym: Ingriese(i)
- Time zone: UTC+1 (CET)
  - Summer (DST): UTC+2 (CEST)
- Postal code: 10080
- Dialing code: 0124

Ingria (Piedmontese: L'Ingri, Arpitan: L'Éngri) is a comune (municipality) in the Metropolitan City of Turin in the Italian region Piedmont, located about 45 kilometres (28 mi) north of Turin in the Valle Soana.

Ingria borders the following municipalities: Ronco Canavese, Traversella, Frassinetto, Pont Canavese, and Sparone. It is one of I Borghi più belli d'Italia ("The most beautiful villages of Italy").

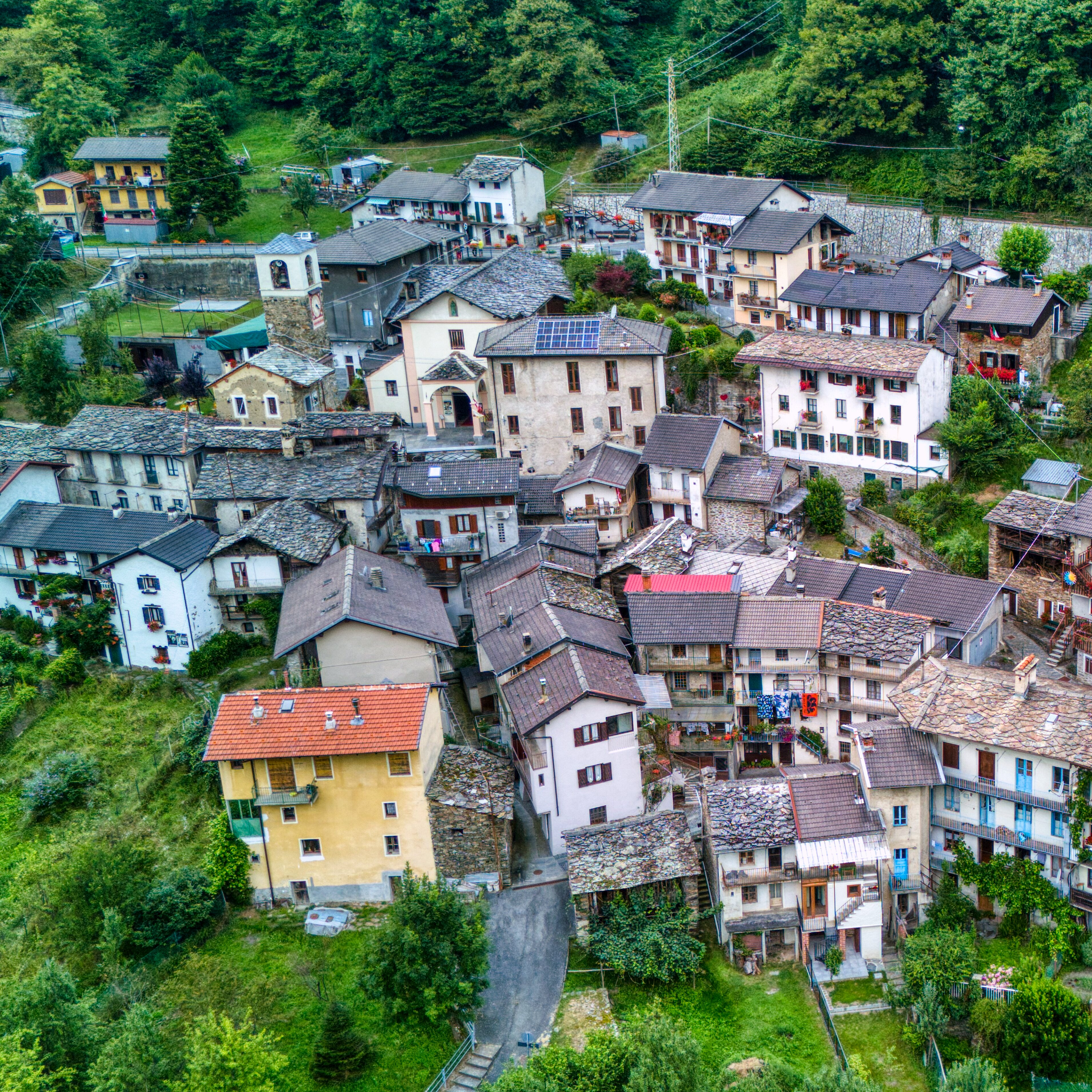
An aerial view of Ingria
