= Chiusella Valley =

Topographical feature in the Italian Alps

- Val Chiusella or Valchiusella
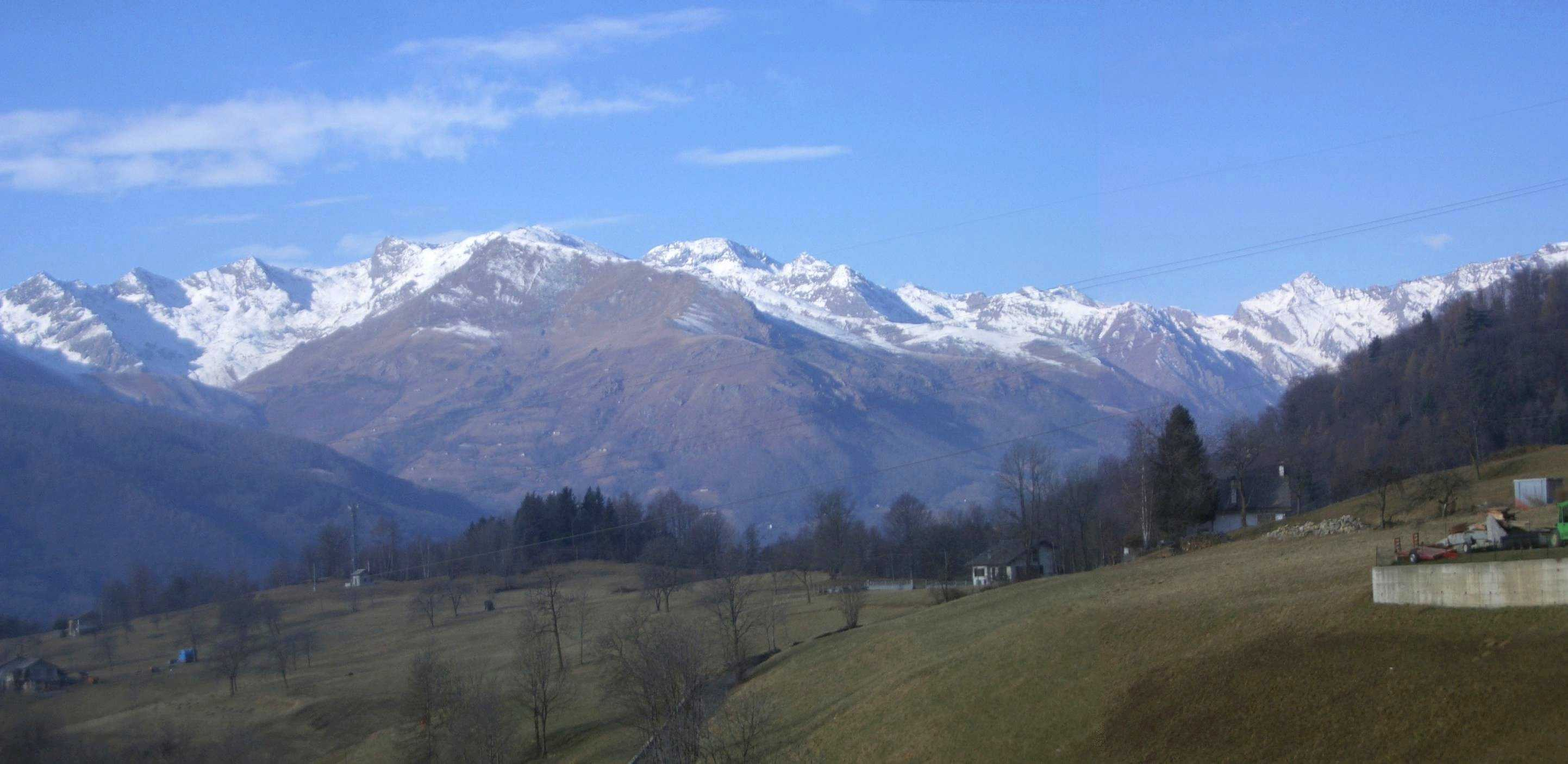
- Some of the mountains in the NW of the valley

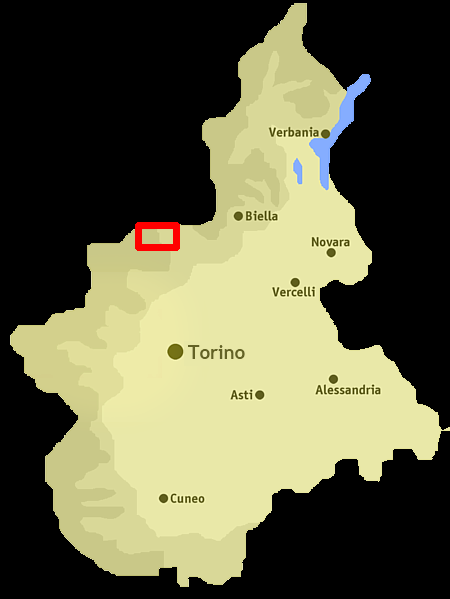
- Location of the valley in Piedmont, northern Italy
- Floor elevation: 375–2,819 m (1,230–9,249 ft)
- Length: around 25 km (16 mi) NW SE

Geology
- Type: River valley

Geography
- Location: Piedmont, Italy
- Coordinates: 45°31′01″N 7°45′00″E

The Chiusella valley (in Italian Valle Chiusella or, simply, Valchiusella) is a valley in the Province of Turin (Piedmont, Italy).

== Etymology ==
Valchiusella takes its name from Chiusella, a right-hand tributary of the Dora Baltea which flows through the valley.

== Geography ==
The valley starts in the Graian Alps from the rough mountains where it meets with Aosta and Soana valleys and initially encompasses an almost unpopulated area used as pasturage during the summer. After Traversella the valley widens and becomes a hilly area punctuated with several small towns and villages.

=== Municipalities of the valley ===
The Val Chiusella is divided among the municipalities of:

- Brosso,
- Issiglio,
- Rueglio,
- Traversella,
- Val di Chy,
- Valchiusa
- Vidracco,
- Vistrorio

== Notable summits ==
Among the summits which surround the valley (all belonging to the Graian Alps) there are:

- Monfandì - 2.819 m
- Monte dei Corni - 2.778 m
- Mount Giavino - 2.766 m
- Mount Marzo - 2.756 m
- Punta Liamau - 2.734 m
- Mount Debat - 2.622 m
- Punta Mariasco - 2.412 m
- Monte Gregorio - 1955 m
- Cima Bossola - 1.510 m

== See also ==
- Chiusella, the river that flows through the valley
- Federation of Damanhur, an ecovillage and spiritual community situated about 50 kilometres (31 mi) north of the city of Turin
- Gran Paradiso National Park, contiguous with the French Vanoise National Park, located in the foothills of the Alps
