= Borgofranco d'Ivrea =

- Comune
- Comune di Borgofranco d'Ivrea
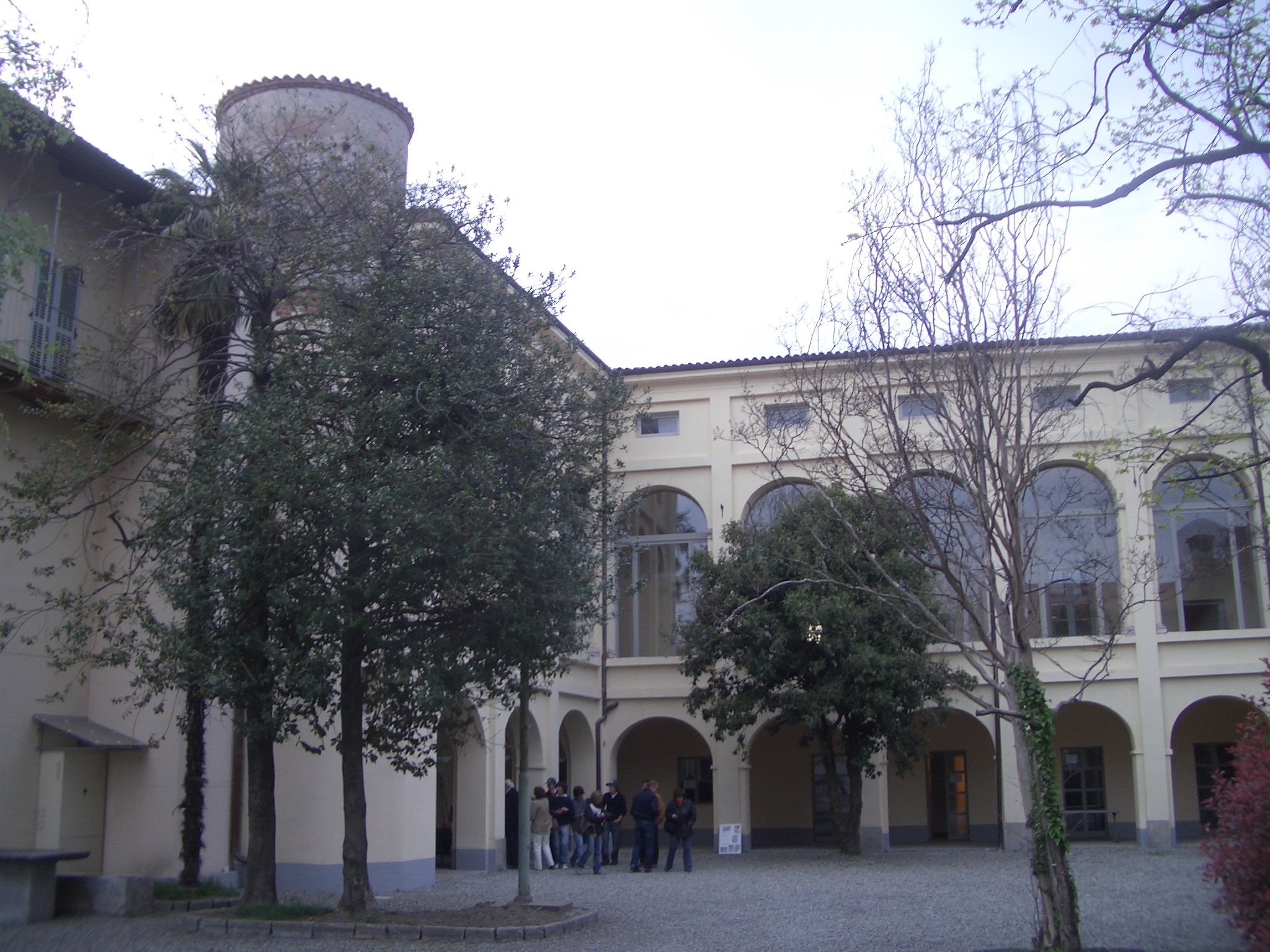

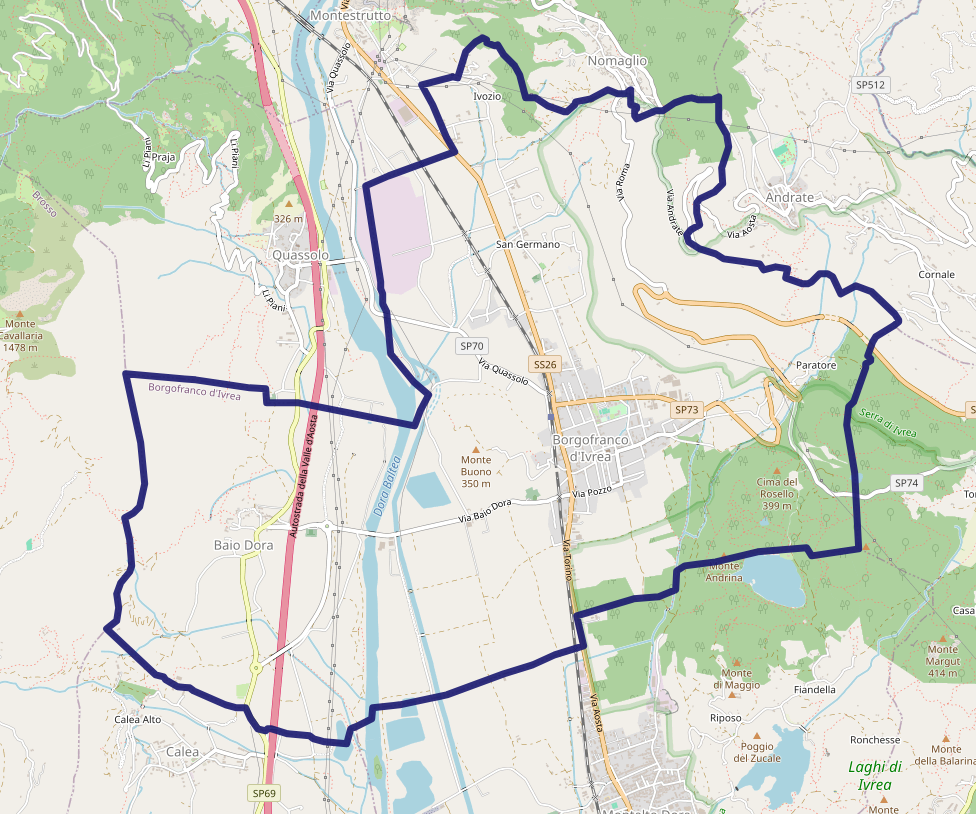

- Location within Italy Location within Piedmont
- Coordinates: 45°31′N 7°52′E
- Country: Italy
- Region: Piedmont
- Metropolitan city: Turin (TO)

Government
  - Mayor: Livio Tola

Area
  - Total: 13.42 km^{2} (5.18 sq mi)
- Elevation: 253 m (830 ft)

Population (1-1-2017)
  - Total: 3,740
  - Density: 279/km^{2} (722/sq mi)
- Demonym: Borgofranchese(i)
- Time zone: UTC+1 (CET)
  - Summer (DST): UTC+2 (CEST)
- Postal code: 10013
- Dialing code: 0125
- Website: Official website

Borgofranco d'Ivrea is a comune (municipality) in the Metropolitan City of Turin in the Italian region Piedmont, about 50 kilometres (31 mi) north of Turin.

Borgofranco d'Ivrea borders the following municipalities: Settimo Vittone, Andrate, Nomaglio, Brosso, Quassolo, Chiaverano, Montalto Dora, and Lessolo.

The "Balmetti"

Characteristic of this area of Canavese, these are natural cavities in the mountain, adapted over the centuries by the inhabitants to cellars and food storage, where the temperature is constant thanks to the circulation of air caused by complex natural geothermal phenomena. The term balmetti (balmit in the Canavese variant of the Piedmontese language) derives from balma, meaning shelter under rock, cave.
