= Mount Marzo =

Mountain in Italy

- Italian: Monte Marzo; French: Mont Mars
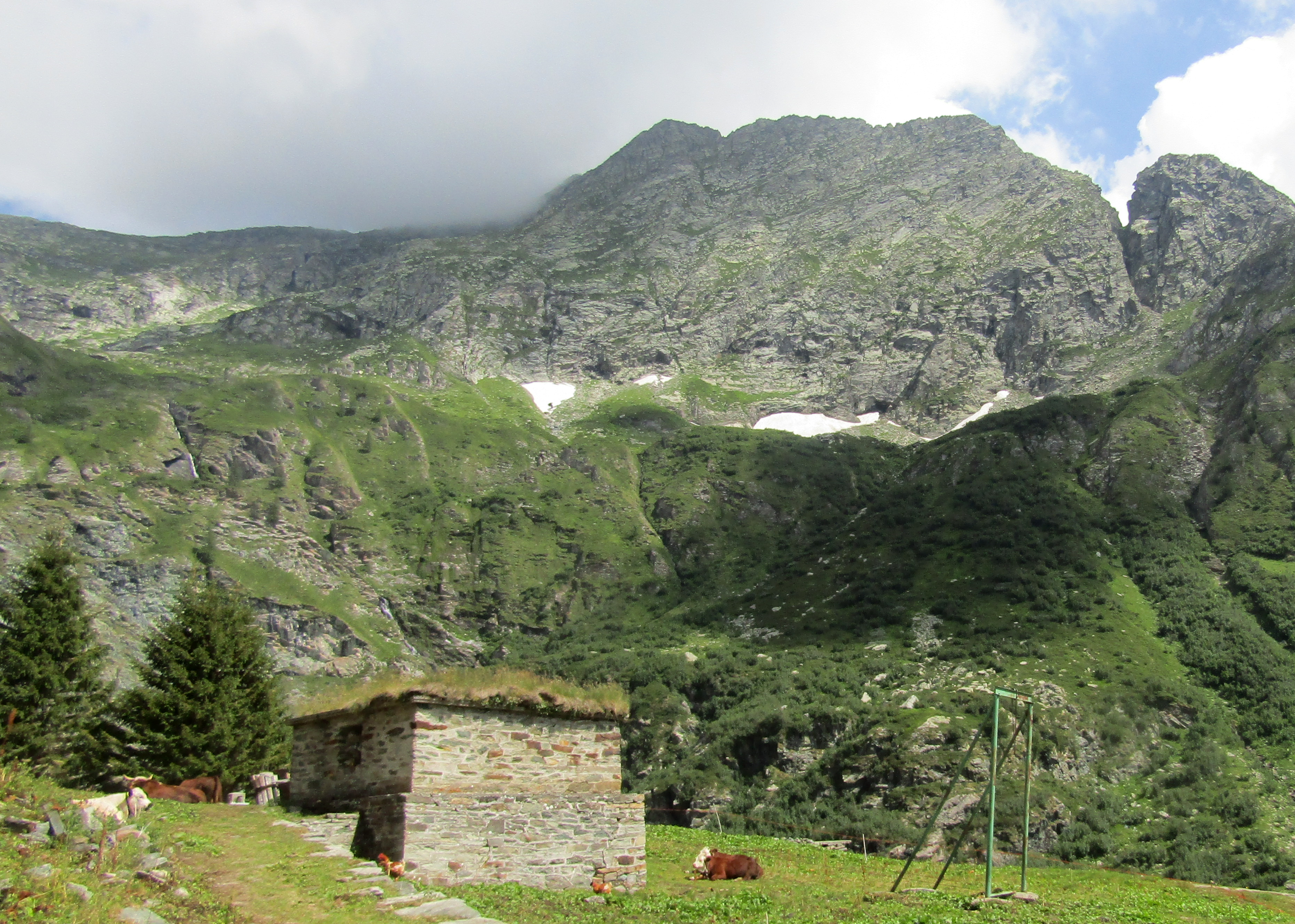
- Mount Marzo from Soana Valley

Highest point
- Elevation: 2,756 m (9,042 ft)
- Prominence: 292 m (958 ft)
- Coordinates: 45°33′45″N 7°36′32″E

Geography
- Location within Alps
- Location: Province of Turin, Italy; Aosta Valley, Italy

Mount Marzo (Italian: Monte Marzo, French: Mont Mars) is a 2,756 m (9,042 ft) tall mountain of the Graian Alps in northern Italy. Its summit lies on the boundary between the municipalities of Valprato Soana and Valchiusa in Piedmont, and Champorcher, in the Aosta Valley, Italy.

== Description ==
Rosa dei Banchi (French: Rose des Bancs) rises on the watershed between the Soana Valley and the Chiusella Valley, in Piedmont, and the Champorcher Valley, in the Aosta Valley. The Chiusella river, which flows through the Chiusella Valley, has its source on the slopes of the mountain.

The summit coincides with the Italian Military Geographic Institute geodetic triangulation point known as Monte Marzo (code 042072). A metal summit cross, erected to commemorate the Holy Year of 1933, stands at the mountain's peak.

== SOIUSA classification ==
According to the SOIUSA (International Standardized Mountain Subdivision of the Alps) the mountain can be classified in the following way:

- main part = Western Alps
- major sector = North Western Alps
- section = Graian Alps
- subsection = Alpi del Gran Paradiso
- supergroup = Gruppo della Rosa dei Banchi
- group = Costiera del Monte Marzo
