= Brosso =

- Comune
- Comune di Brosso
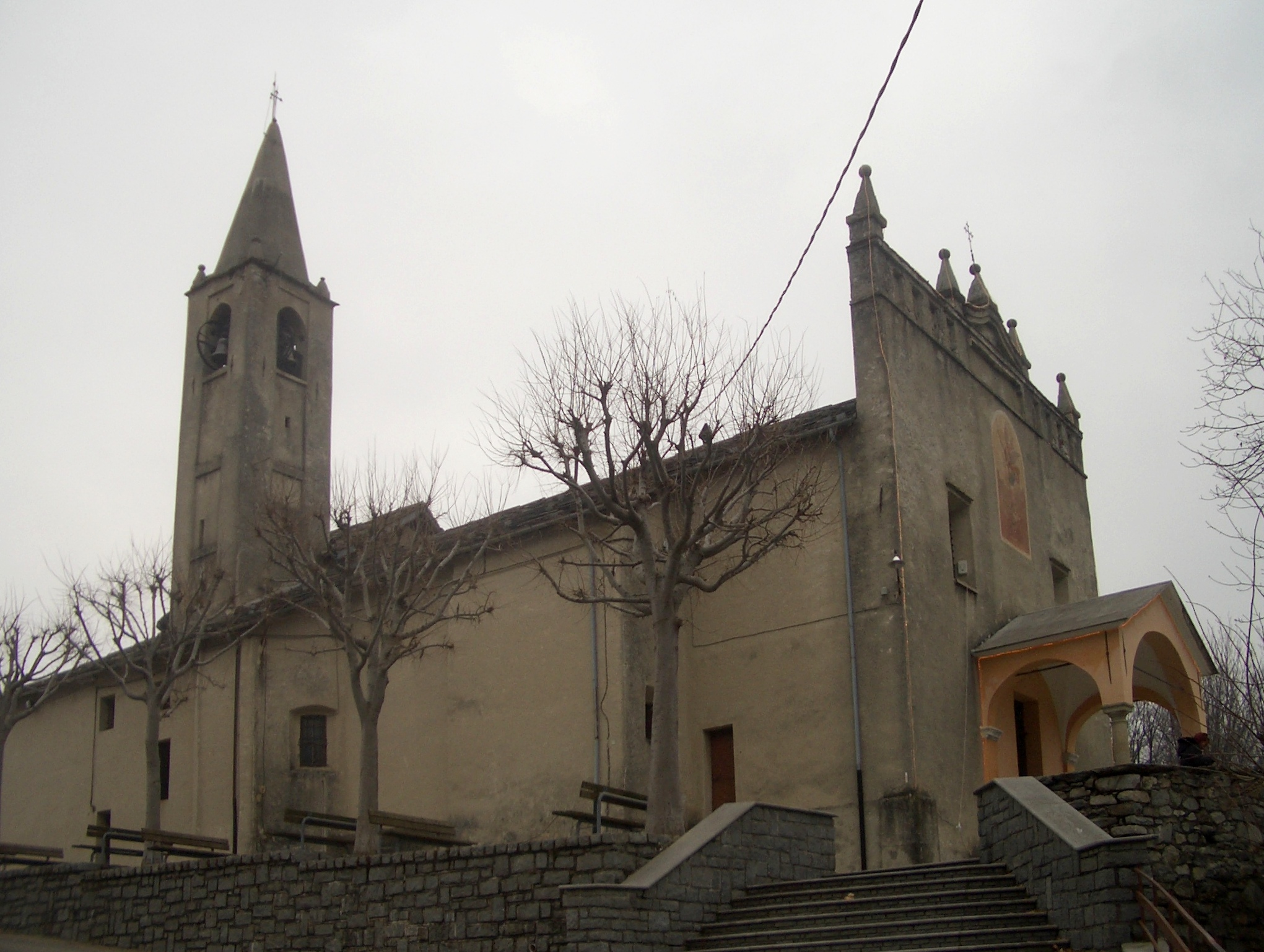

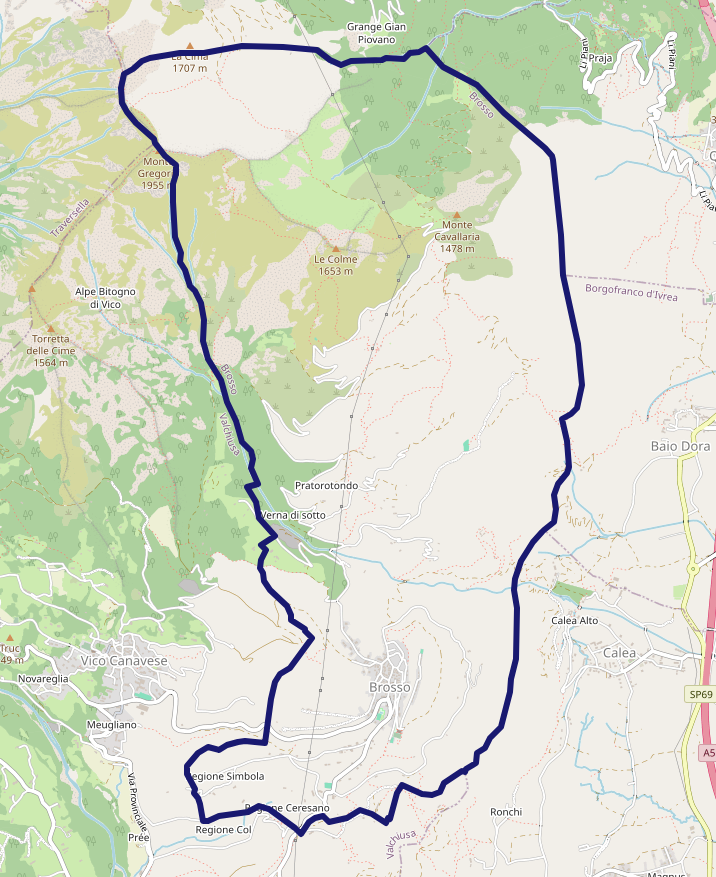

- Location within Italy Location within Piedmont
- Coordinates: 45°30′N 7°48′E
- Country: Italy
- Region: Piedmont
- Metropolitan city: Turin (TO)

Government
  - Mayor: Anna Serafina Vigliermo Brusso

Area
  - Total: 11.14 km^{2} (4.30 sq mi)
- Elevation: 797 m (2,615 ft)

Population (31 August 2021)
  - Total: 400
  - Density: 36/km^{2} (93/sq mi)
- Demonym: Brossesi or Brossolesi
- Time zone: UTC+1 (CET)
  - Summer (DST): UTC+2 (CEST)
- Postal code: 10080
- Dialing code: 0125
- Website: Official website

Brosso is a comune (municipality) in the Metropolitan City of Turin in the Italian region of Piedmont, located about 50 kilometres (31 mi) north of Turin.

Brosso borders the following municipalities: Tavagnasco, Traversella, Borgofranco d'Ivrea, Quassolo, Lessolo, and Valchiusa.
