= Lessolo =

- Comune
- Comune di Lessolo
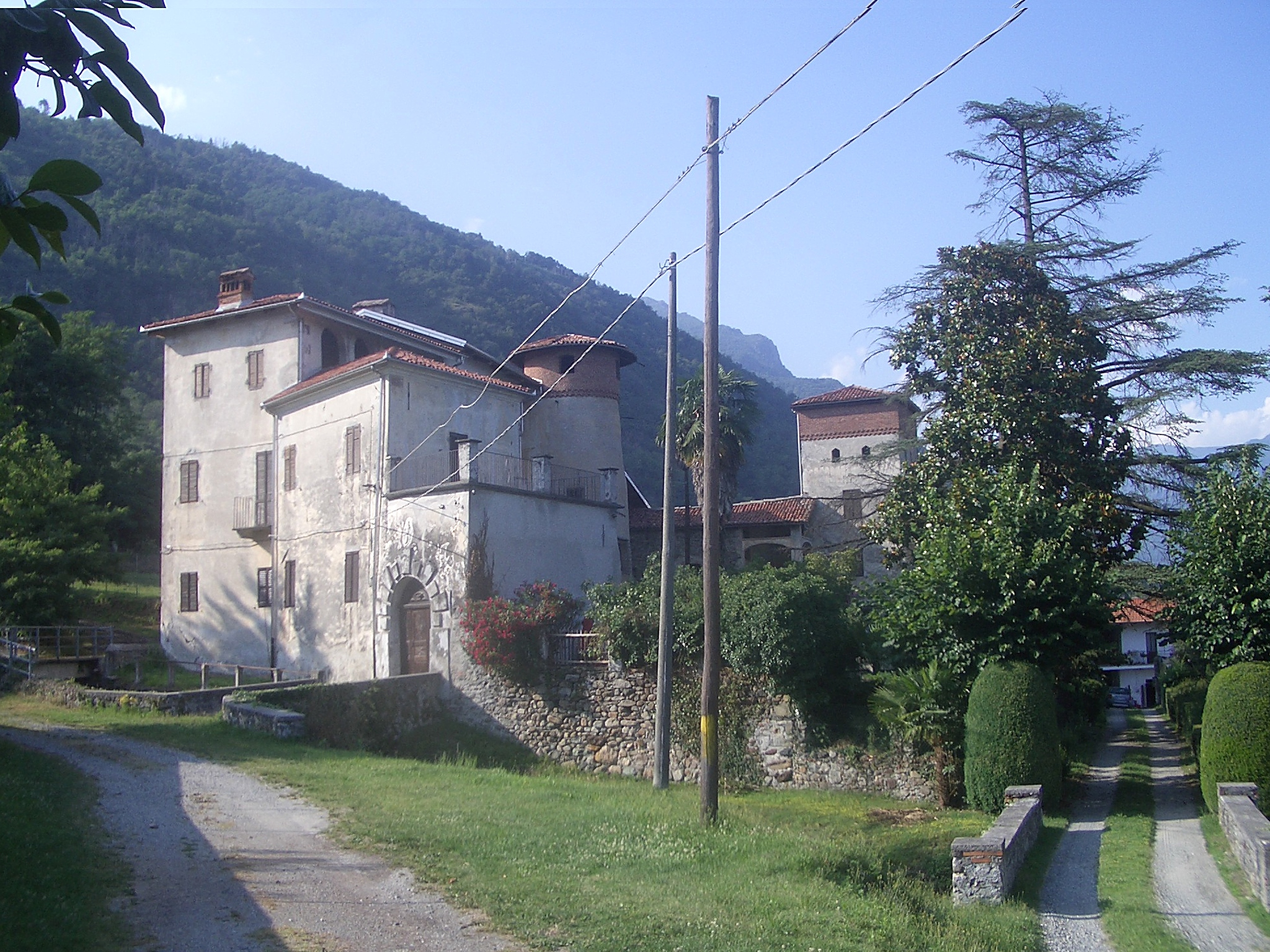

- Location within Italy Location within Piedmont
- Coordinates: 45°29′N 7°49′E
- Country: Italy
- Region: Piedmont
- Metropolitan city: Turin (TO)

Government
  - Mayor: Elena Caffaro

Area
  - Total: 7.94 km^{2} (3.07 sq mi)
- Elevation: 277 m (909 ft)

Population (31 August 2021)
  - Total: 1,780
  - Density: 224/km^{2} (581/sq mi)
- Demonym: Lessolesi
- Time zone: UTC+1 (CET)
  - Summer (DST): UTC+2 (CEST)
- Postal code: 10010
- Dialing code: 0125
- Patron saint: St. George
- Saint day: 23 April
- Website: Official website

Lessolo is a comune (municipality) in the Metropolitan City of Turin in the Italian region Piedmont, located about 45 kilometres (28 mi) north of Turin.

Lessolo borders the following municipalities: Brosso, Borgofranco d'Ivrea, Montalto Dora, Val di Chy, Valchiusa, and Fiorano Canavese.
