= Valprato Soana =

Valprato Soana Vâlprà (Piedmontese) Vâlprà (Arpitan)
- Comune
- Comune di Valprato Soana
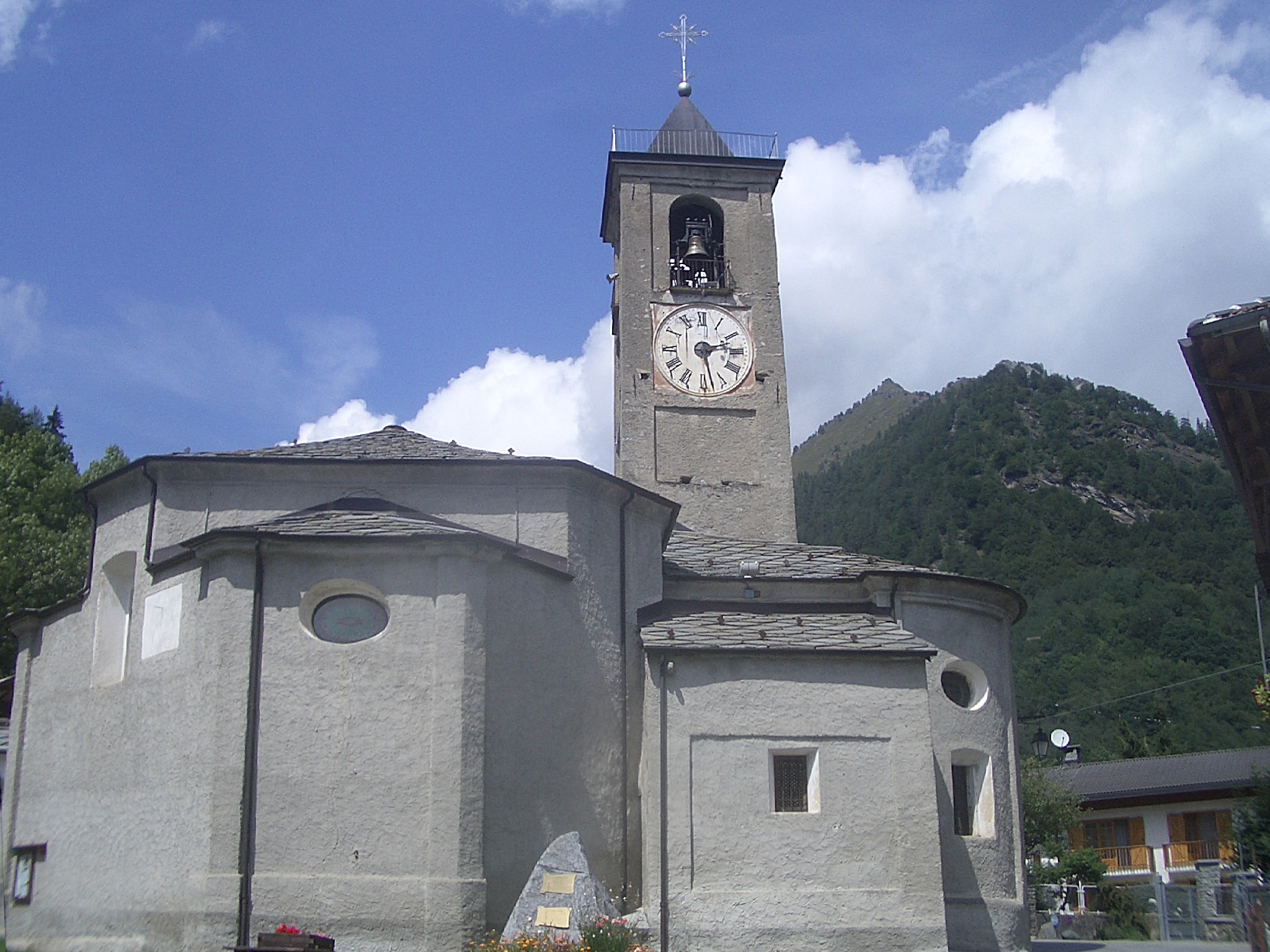
- Parish church.

- Coat of arms

- Location within Italy Location within Piedmont
- Coordinates: 45°31′N 7°33′E
- Country: Italy
- Region: Piedmont
- Metropolitan city: Turin (TO)

Government
  - Mayor: Francesco Bozzato

Area
  - Total: 71.85 km^{2} (27.74 sq mi)
- Elevation: 1,113 m (3,652 ft)

Population (31 May 2021)
  - Total: 92
  - Density: 1.3/km^{2} (3.3/sq mi)
- Demonym: Valpratesi
- Time zone: UTC+1 (CET)
  - Summer (DST): UTC+2 (CEST)
- Postal code: 10080
- Dialing code: 0124
- Website: Official website

Valprato Soana (Piedmontese and Arpitan: Vâlprà) is a comune (municipality) in the Metropolitan City of Turin in the Italian region Piedmont, located about 50 kilometres (31 mi) north of Turin, in Val Soana, included in the Gran Paradiso National Park. It borders the municipalities of Cogne, Champorcher, Ronco Canavese, Traversella and Valchiusa.
