= Frassinetto =

Frassinetto Frassinè (Piedmontese) Frasinei (Arpitan)
- Comune
- Comune di Frassinetto
- Location within Italy Location within Piedmont
- Coordinates: 45°26′N 7°36′E
- Country: Italy
- Region: Piedmont
- Metropolitan city: Turin (TO)
- Frazioni: Chiapinetto, Berchiotto, Trifoglio

Government
  - Mayor: Marco Pietro Bonatto Marchello

Area
  - Total: 24.7 km^{2} (9.5 sq mi)
- Elevation: 1,050 m (3,440 ft)

Population (31 December 2010)
  - Total: 277
  - Density: 11.2/km^{2} (29.0/sq mi)
- Demonym: Frassinettesi
- Time zone: UTC+1 (CET)
  - Summer (DST): UTC+2 (CEST)
- Postal code: 10080
- Dialing code: 0124

Frassinetto (Piedmontese: Frassinè, Arpitan: Frasinei) is a comune (municipality) in the Metropolitan City of Turin in the Italian region Piedmont, located about 40 kilometres (25 mi) north of Turin. Frassinetto borders the following municipalities: Traversella, Ingria, Pont Canavese, Borgiallo, Castelnuovo Nigra, and Chiesanuova.

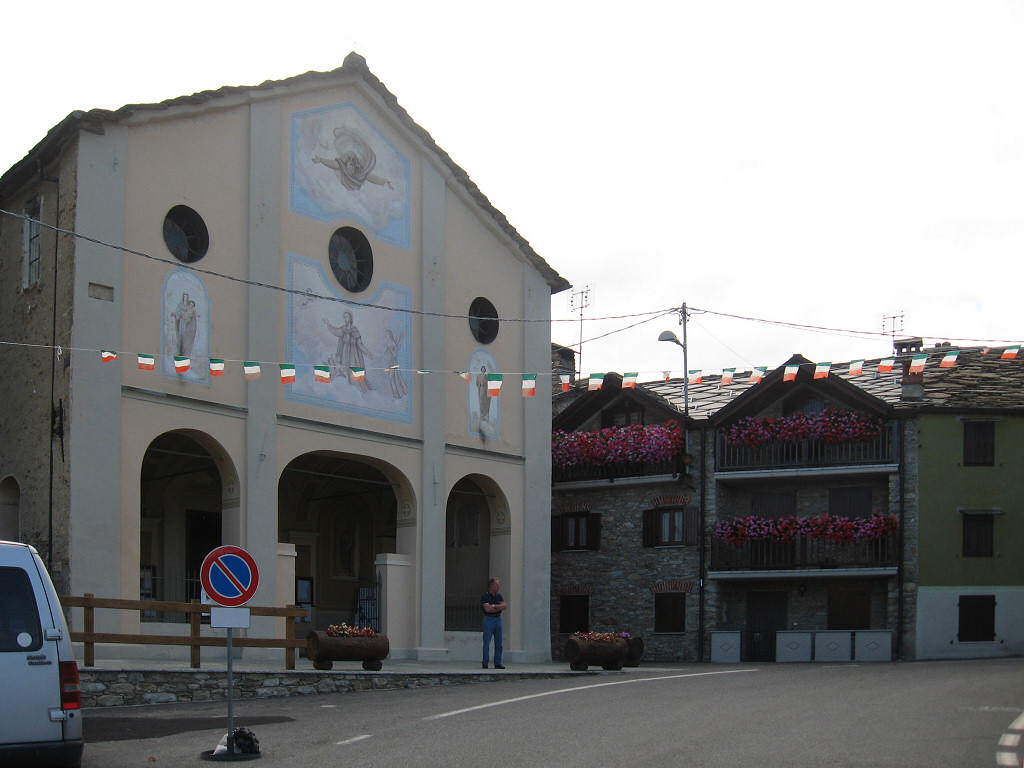
Church of San Bartolomeo in Frassinetto
