= Traversella =

- Comune
- Comune di Traversella
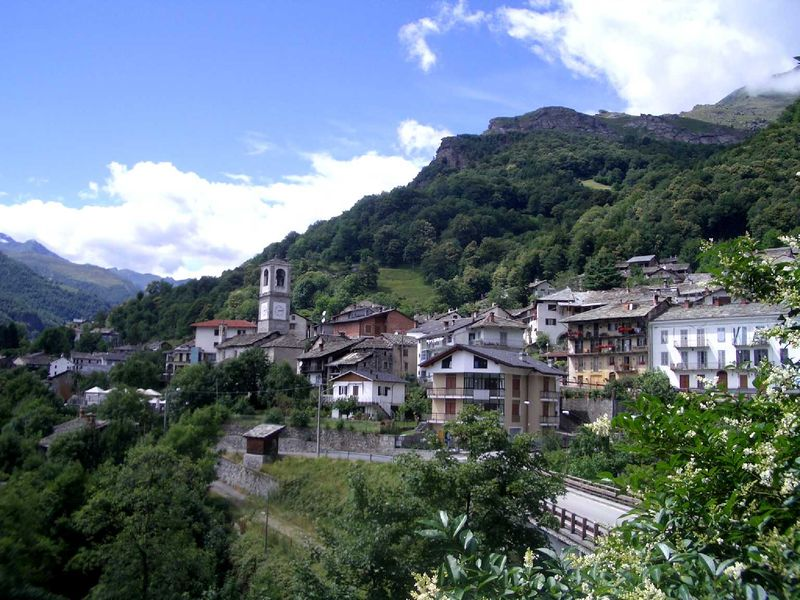

- Location within Italy Location within Piedmont
- Coordinates: 45°31′N 7°45′E
- Country: Italy
- Region: Piedmont
- Metropolitan city: Turin (TO)
- Frazioni: Cantoncello, Cappia, Chiara, Delpizzen, Fondo, Succinto, Tallorno

Government
  - Mayor: Renza Colombatto

Area
  - Total: 39.36 km^{2} (15.20 sq mi)
- Elevation: 827 m (2,713 ft)

Population (31 March 2022)
  - Total: 316
  - Density: 8.03/km^{2} (20.8/sq mi)
- Demonym: Traversellesi
- Time zone: UTC+1 (CET)
  - Summer (DST): UTC+2 (CEST)
- Postal code: 10080
- Dialing code: 0125
- Website: Official website

Traversella is a comune (municipality) in the Metropolitan City of Turin in the Italian region Piedmont, located Metropolitan City about 50 kilometres (31 mi) north of Turin.

Traversella borders the following municipalities: Pontboset, Donnas, Valprato Soana, Quincinetto, Ronco Canavese, Tavagnasco, Brosso, Valchiusa, Ingria, Frassinetto and Castelnuovo Nigra.

In the frazione of Fondo lies the Fondo Bridge.
