= Pontboset =

Pontboset Ponbozé (Valdôtain)
- Comune
- Comune di Pontboset; Commune de Pontboset
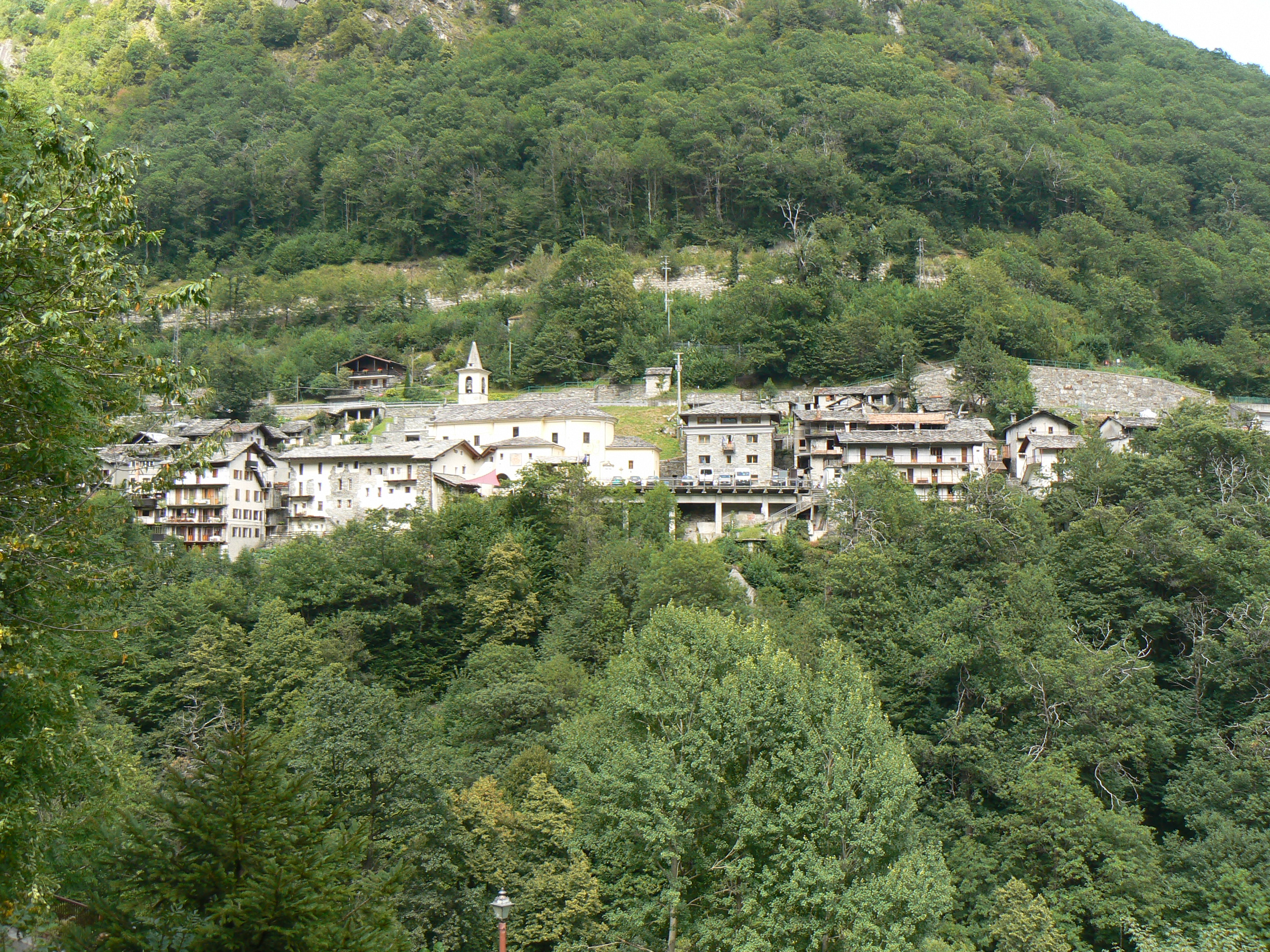

- Location within Italy Location within Aosta Valley
- Coordinates: 45°36′N 7°41′E
- Country: Italy
- Region: Aosta Valley
- Province: none
- Frazioni: Pont-Bozet (chef-lieu), La Place, Frassiney, Savin, Trambésère, Pialemont, Piolly, Vareisaz, Terrisse, Valvieille, Frontière, Écreux, Crest dessous, Crest dessus, Percellette, Folliettaz, Délivret, Fournier, La Bourney, Barmelle, Barmacrépaz, Châteigne

Area
  - Total: 33 km^{2} (13 sq mi)
- Elevation: 780 m (2,560 ft)

Population (31 December 2022)
  - Total: 172
  - Density: 5.2/km^{2} (13/sq mi)
- Demonym: Pontbosards
- Time zone: UTC+1 (CET)
  - Summer (DST): UTC+2 (CEST)
- Postal code: 11020
- Dialing code: 0125
- ISTAT code: 7050
- Patron saint: St. Gratus
- Saint day: 7 September
- Website: Official website

Pontboset (French: [pɔ̃bozɛ]; Valdôtain: Ponbozé) is a town and comune in the Aosta Valley region of north-western Italy.
