= Donnas =

Donnas Dounah (Valdôtain) Dunaz (Walser) Donàs (Piedmontese)
- Comune
- Comune di Donnas; Commune de Donnas
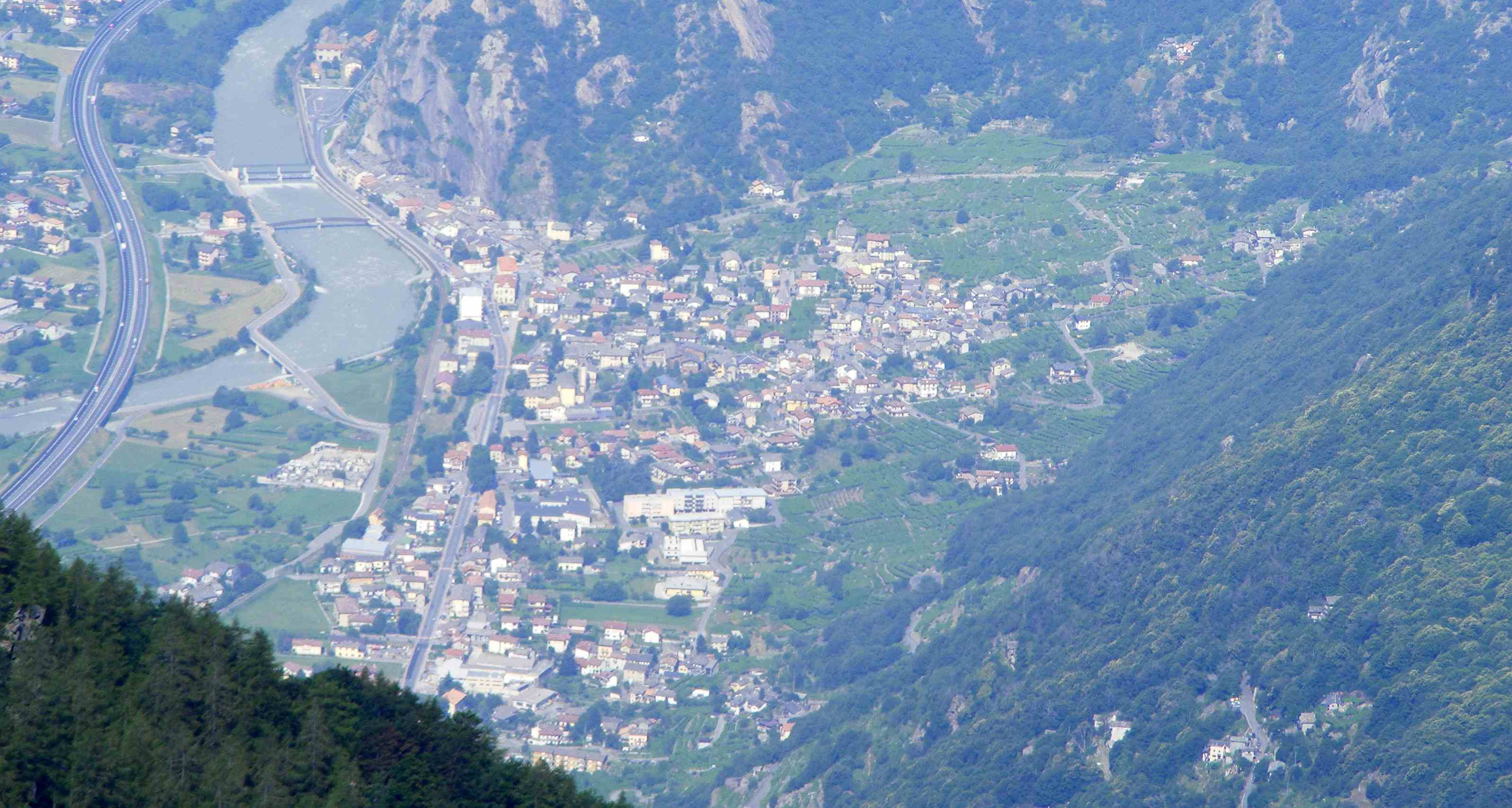

- Coat of arms

- Location within Italy Location within Aosta Valley
- Coordinates: 45°36′N 7°46′E
- Country: Italy
- Region: Aosta Valley
- Province: none
- Frazioni: Albard, Artade, Balmasse, Barat, Barme, Berriou, Beuby, Bodonne, Bondon, Bonze, Chanton, Chélevrinne, Chenail, Cignas, Clapey, Coudrette, Fabrique, Fioley, Glaires, Grand-Vert, I Pian, La Balmaz, La Cervaz, Lillaz, Lius, Mamy, Montat, Montey, La Moya, Novesse, Outrefer, Paians, Painfey, Pampéry, Perroz, Peyron, Place, Planet, Piole, Pomerou, Porcelette, Pramotton, Praposaz, Prelle, Reisen, Ronc, Ronc-de-Vaccaz, Rossignod, Rovarey

Government
  - Mayor: Amedeo Follioley

Area
  - Total: 33.97 km^{2} (13.12 sq mi)
- Elevation: 322 m (1,056 ft)

Population (31 December 2022)
  - Total: 2,420
  - Density: 71.2/km^{2} (185/sq mi)
- Demonym: Donnassins
- Time zone: UTC+1 (CET)
  - Summer (DST): UTC+2 (CEST)
- Postal code: 11020
- Dialing code: 0125
- Website: Official website

Donnas (French: [dɔnas]; Valdôtain: Dounah or Dounàs; Issime Walser: Dunaz; Piedmontese: Donàs) is a town and comune in the Aosta Valley region of northwestern Italy.
