= Bec Costazza =

Mountain in Italy

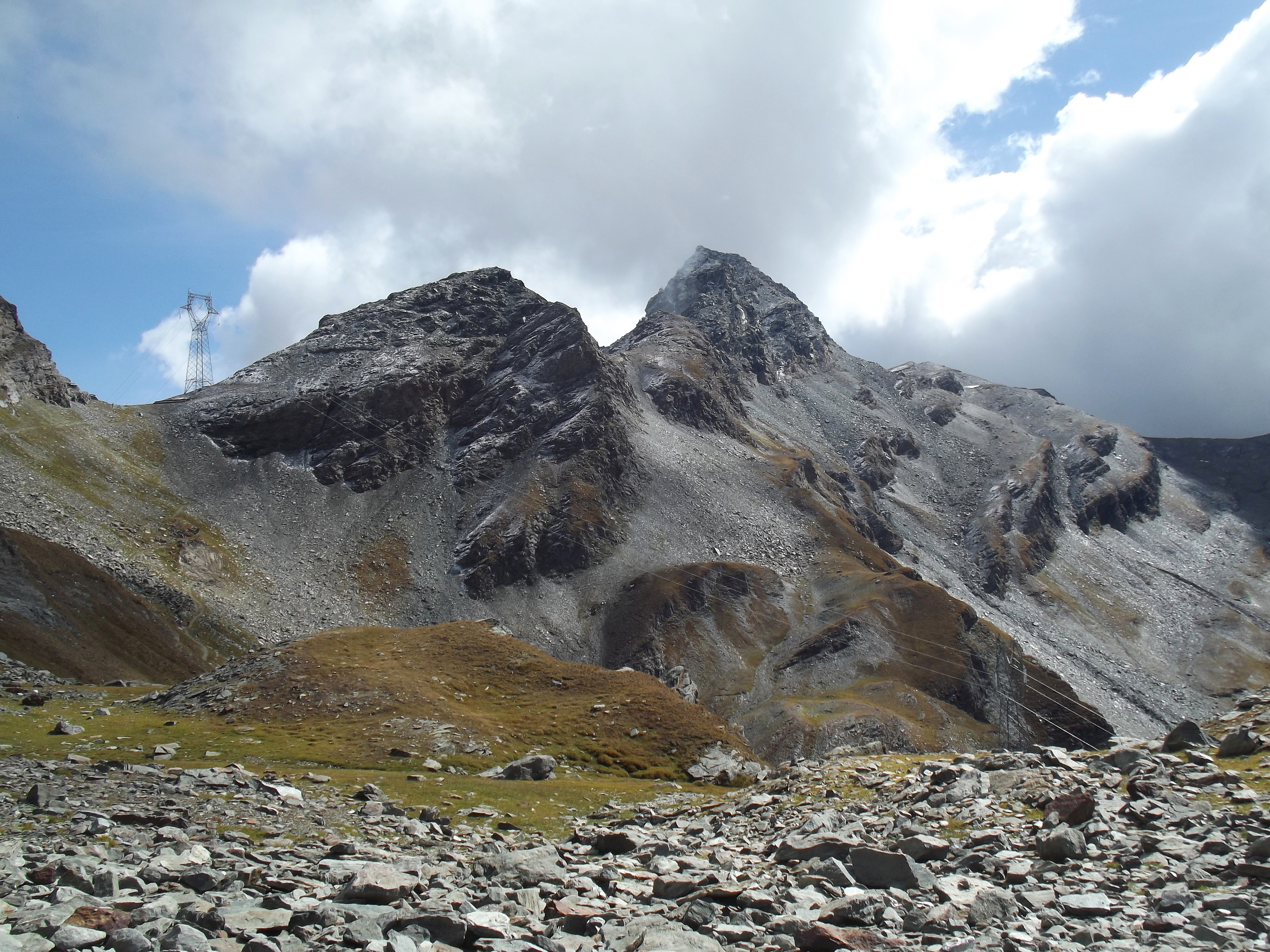
- Bec Costazza and the Fenêtre de Champorcher

Highest point
- Elevation: 3,092 m (10,144 ft)
- Coordinates: 45°35′36″N 7°30′16″E

Geography
- Location within Alps
- Location: Aosta Valley, Italy

Bec Costazza (French: Bec-Cotasse) is a 3,092 m (10,144 ft) tall mountain of the Graian Alps in northern Italy. Its summit lies on the boundary between the municipalities of Cogne and Champorcher in the Aosta Valley, Italy.

== Description ==
Bec Costazza stands on the ridge separating the Champorcher Valley to the east from the Cogne Valley to the west. The ridge is crossed by the Fenêtre de Champorcher mountain pass, which lies immediately north of the summit.

== SOIUSA classification ==
According to the SOIUSA (International Standardized Mountain Subdivision of the Alps) the mountain can be classified in the following way:

- main part = Western Alps
- major sector = North Western Alps
- section = Graian Alps
- subsection = Alpi del Gran Paradiso
- supergroup = Gruppo della Rosa dei Banchi
- group = Nodo della Rosa dei Banchi

== Ascent ==
The summit can be climbed from both the Champorcher and the Cogne Valley. From the Champorcher Valley, the standard route begins at the Refuge Dondénaz, passes Lake Misérin, and continues up the mountain's south-eastern slopes to the summit. From the Cogne Valley, the route starts at the Refuge Sogno di Berdzé at Péradzà, crosses the Fenêtre de Champorcher, and follows the ridge to the summit.

The first documented ascent was made in 1848 by Abbot Pierre Chanoux.
