= Champorcher Valley =

Valley in the Italian Alps

Coordinates: 45.618904°N 7.640455°E

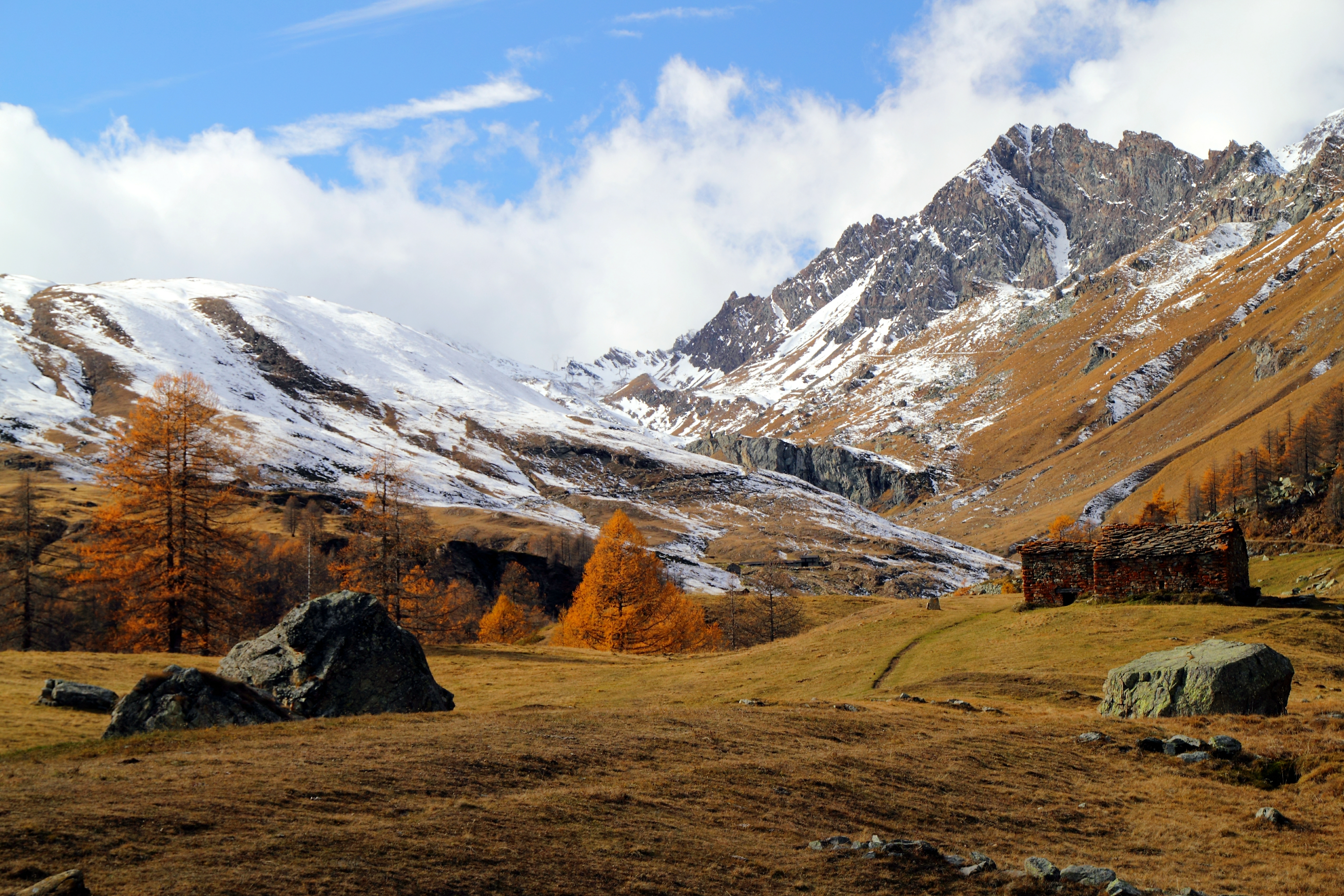
The upper Champorcher Valley

The Champorcher Valley (Italian: Valle di Champorcher, French: Vallée de Champorcher) is a side valley of the Aosta Valley in the Alps in northern Italy.

== Geography ==
The Champorcher Valley lies on the right orographic side of the Dora Baltea, the main river of the Aosta Valley. It extends for approximately 20 km (12 mi) in an east–west direction, from its confluence with the Dora Baltea Valley at Hône in the east to its head at the Fenêtre de Champorcher mountain pass to the west. The valley is drained by the Ayasse, a mountain stream that rises from Lake Misérin and flows through its entire length before joining the Dora Baltea. The valley is very narrow and compressed at its beginning and gradually fans out towards its head. With 3,185 m (10,449 ft) in elevation, Mont Glacier is the highest summit in the valley.

The valley is bounded by the Champdepraz Valley to the north, the Clavalité Valley to the north-west, the Cogne Valley to the west, to which it is connected by the Fenêtre de Champorcher, and Piedmont's Chiusella Valley and Soana Valley to the south-east and south-west, respectively.

The southern watershed, separating the valley from the Chiusella and Soana valleys, is formed by a continuous Alpine ridge. From east to west, its principal summits include Bec Cocor (2,142 m, 7,028 ft), overlooking Hône, Mount Debat (2,622 m, 8,602 ft), Punta Dondogna (2,550 m, 8,370 ft), Monte dei Corni (2,778 m, 9,114 ft), Mount Marzo (2,756 m, 9,042 ft), and Punta Santanel (2,722 m, 8,930 ft). The section between Mount Debat and Monte dei Corni forms the southern boundary of the municipality of Pontboset and overlooks the lateral Brenve Valley, while Mount Marzo rises above the head of the lateral Alleigne Valley. West of Punta Santanel, the ridge descends toward Col Laris mountain pass, connecting to the Soana Valley.

The first section of the watershed on the opposite side of the valley is less prominent. From Mount Charvatton (1,786 m, 5,860 ft) to Pointe d'Arcomy (1,990 m, 6,530 ft), the ridge remains below 2,000 m (6,600 ft) in elevation. From Cima Piana (2,512 m, 8,241 ft), on the watershed with the Champdepraz Valley, the elevation gradually increases, reaching Gran Rossa's 2,865 m (9,400 ft), and culminating at Mont Glacier.

The upper end of the Champorcher Valley is dominated by its highest peaks, which reflect into the waters of Lake Misérin above Refuge Dondénaz. To the south rises Rosa dei Banchi (3,163 m, 10,377 ft), beneath which lies the Rosa dei Banchi Glacier, the valley's last remaining permanent snowfield. Continuing westward are Bec Costazza (3,092 m, 10,144 ft) and Torre Ponton (3,101 m, 10,174 ft), which are divided by the Fenêtre de Champorcher. On the northern side of the Dondénaz basin stand Mount Moussaillon (3,073 m, 10,082 ft), Mount Dela (3,139 m, 10,299 ft), and Mont Glacier.

Administratively, the valley comprises three comuni, listed from east to west: Hône, Pontboset, and Champorcher.
