= Lake Misérin =

Natural lake in Aosta Valley, Italy

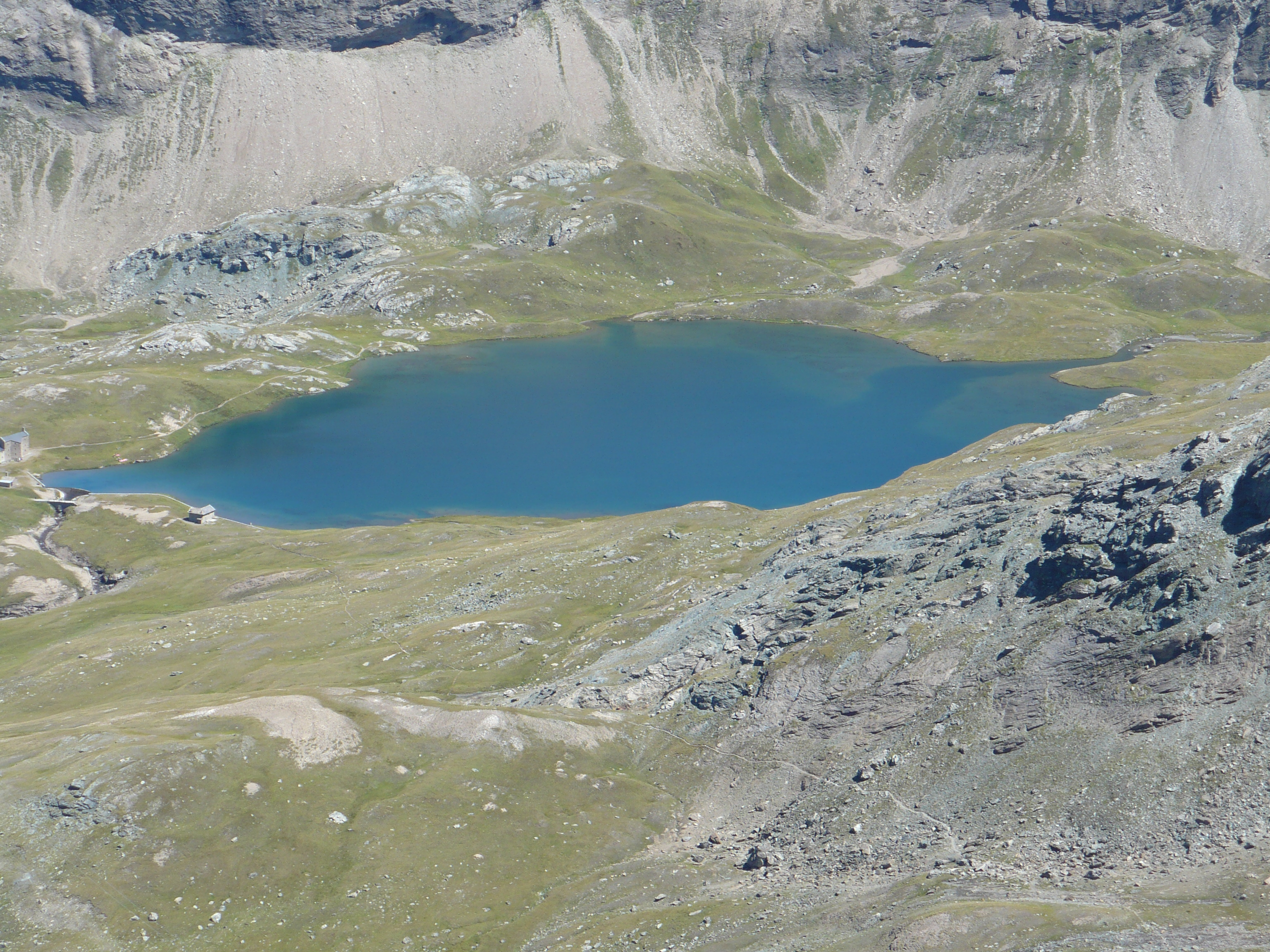
- Lake Misérin seen from the Ponton Tower
- Interactive map of Lake Misérin
- Location: Champorcher, Aosta Valley, Italy
- Coordinates: 45.599482°N 7.522416°E
- Type: Natural
- Primary outflows: Ayasse
- Basin countries: Italy
- Surface area: 0.22 km^{2} (0.085 sq mi)
- Surface elevation: 2,580 m (8,460 ft)

The Lake Misérin (pronounced in French, "Miserèn" - /mizeʁɛ̃/) is located in the upper Champorcher Valley at an altitude of 2,577 m.s.l..

== Description ==
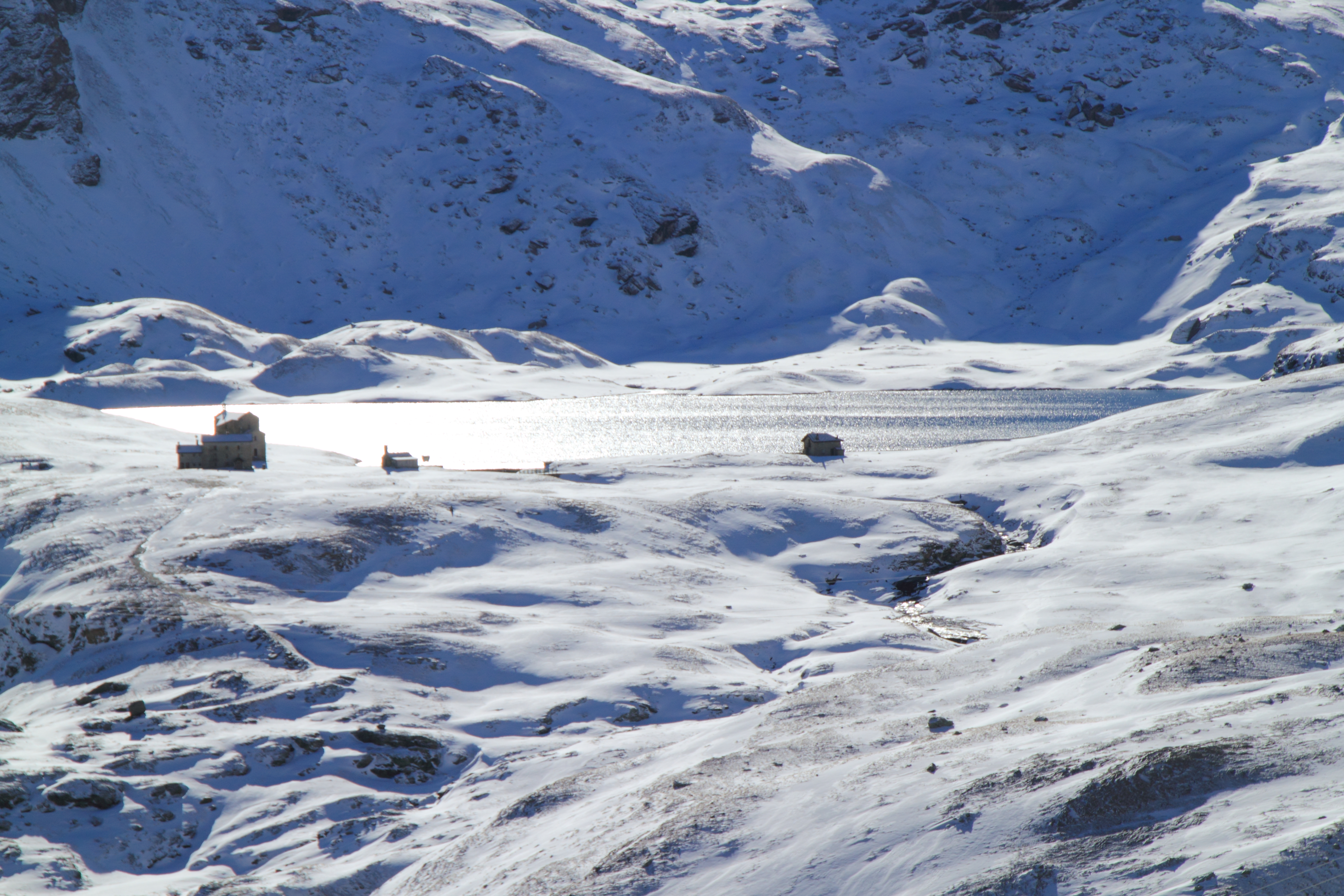
The lake in winter

The lake is situated in the center of a wide basin defined to the west between the Cogne Valley and the Champorcher Valley, to the north by the divide between the latter and the Val Soana, and to the east by the ridge of Monte Rascias, which separates it from the Banchi valley, in Piedmont. Near the lake are the Misérin Hut and the Notre-Dame-des-Neiges sanctuary. The church is the destination at the beginning of August for a historic pilgrimage that brings together devotees from both the Val Soana (in Piedmont, south of the lake) and the Champorcher Valley.

The lake area is a good vantage point for the valley’s peaks, including the Rosa dei Banchi and the Mont Glacier. From the lake’s waters, the Ayasse stream takes shape, which runs through the entire Champorcher Valley.

== Access ==
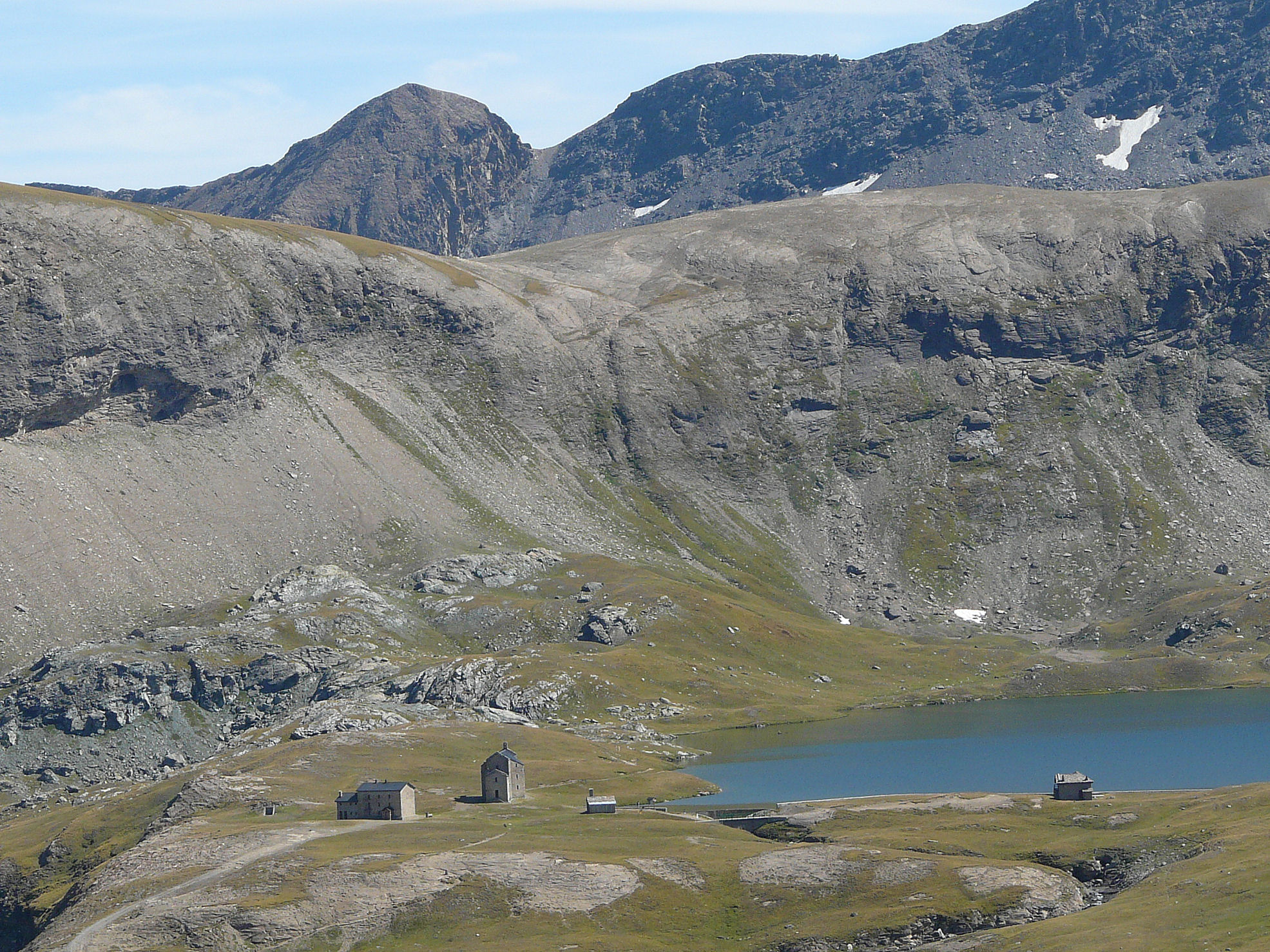
The lake with the refuge and sanctuary

It is possible to reach the lake via a convenient trail starting from the Dondena basin (in French, Cuvette de Dondénaz) near the Refuge Dondénaz. From the Val Soana, the lake can be reached by crossing the Colle della Rosa (2,957 m.s.l.), while the connection with the Cogne Valley is made via the Fenêtre de Champorcher.

== Bibliography ==
- Berutto, Giulio; Fornelli, Lino (2005). Emilius, Rosa dei Banchi. Parco del M. Avic [Emilius, Rosa dei Banchi. Monte Avic Park]. Guida dei Monti d'Italia (in Italian). CAI-TCI. ISBN 9788836531073.

=== Cartography ===
- "Cartografia ufficiale italiana" [Official Italian Cartography] (in Italian). Istituto Geografico Militare (IGM).
- "Navigatore Cartografico SCT (3.14.0)" [SCT Cartographic Navigator (3.14.0)] (in Italian). Regione Autonoma Valle d'Aosta. Archived from the original on 16 May 2019.
- Carta dei sentieri e dei rifugi [Map of Trails and Refuges] (in Italian). Turin: Istituto Geografico Centrale.
