= Fenêtre de Champorcher =

Mountain pass in Italy

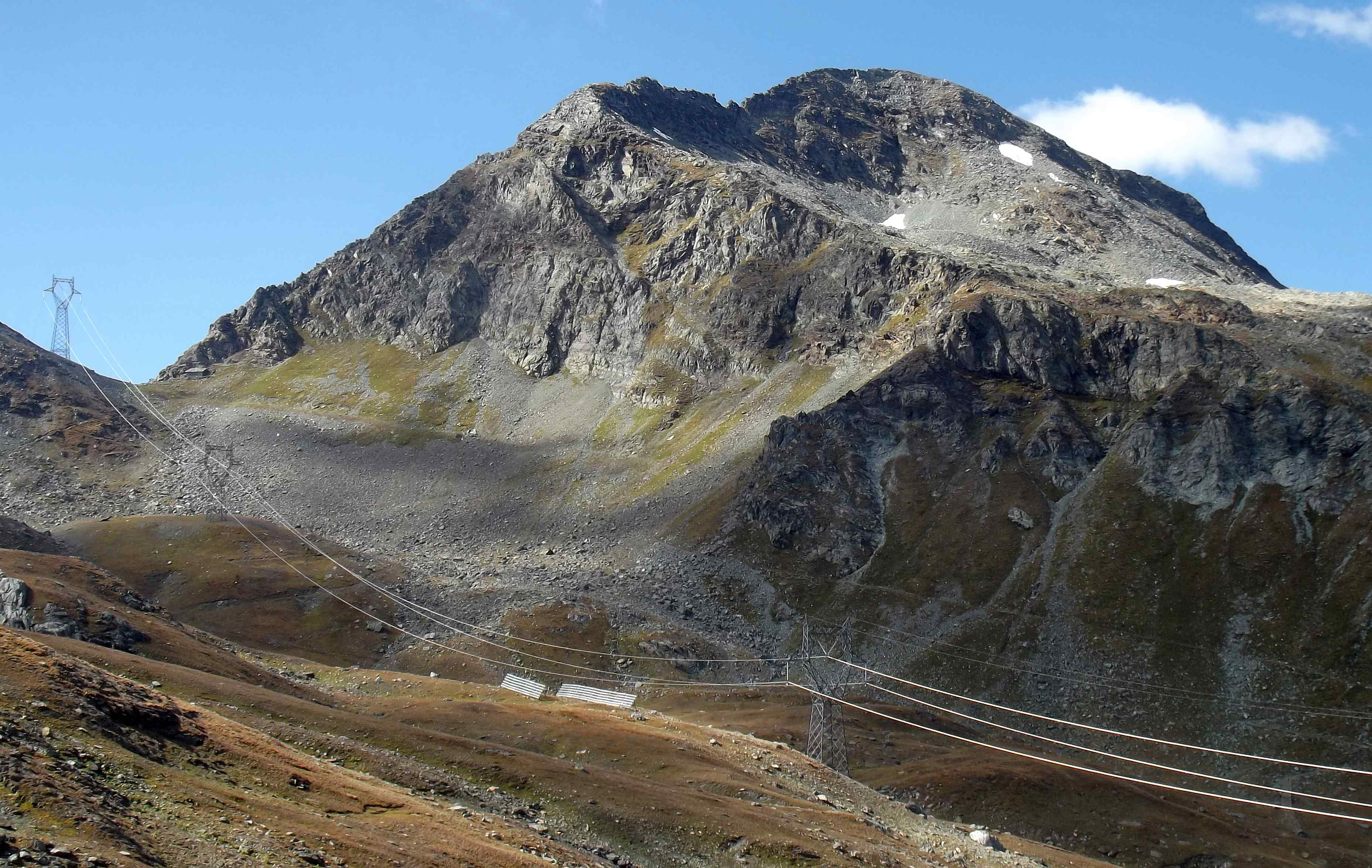
- View of the pass from Champorcher Valley with Torre Ponton

- Location within Alps
- Elevation: 2,827 m (9,275 ft)

Third Approach
- Location: Aosta Valley, Italy
- Range: Graian Alps
- Coordinates: 45°35′58″N 7°29′53″E

The Fenêtre de Champorcher (also Col Fenêtre; sometimes translated into Italian as Finestra di Champorcher) is a 2,827 m (9,275 ft) high Alpine pass in the Graian Alps, connecting the Champorcher Valley to the east with the Cogne Valley to the west, in the Aosta Valley region of northern Italy.

== Description ==
The Fenêtre de Champorcher lies between Bec Costazza (3,092 m (10,144 ft)) and Torre Ponton (3,101 m (10,174 ft)).

On the Champorcher side, the pass is located above Lake Misérin, at the head of the valley. On the Cogne side, it marks the upper end of the Urtier Valley, a side valley of the Cogne Valley.

The pass marks the eastern boundary of Gran Paradiso National Park, which extends westward along the southern side of the Urtier Valley. The western side of the pass, in the Champorcher Valley, is part of Mont Avic Natural Park.

According to the SOIUSA orographic classification, the pass forms the boundary between two of the major subgroups of the Gran Paradiso Alps: the Emilius–Tersiva Chain to the north and the Rosa dei Banchi Group to the south.

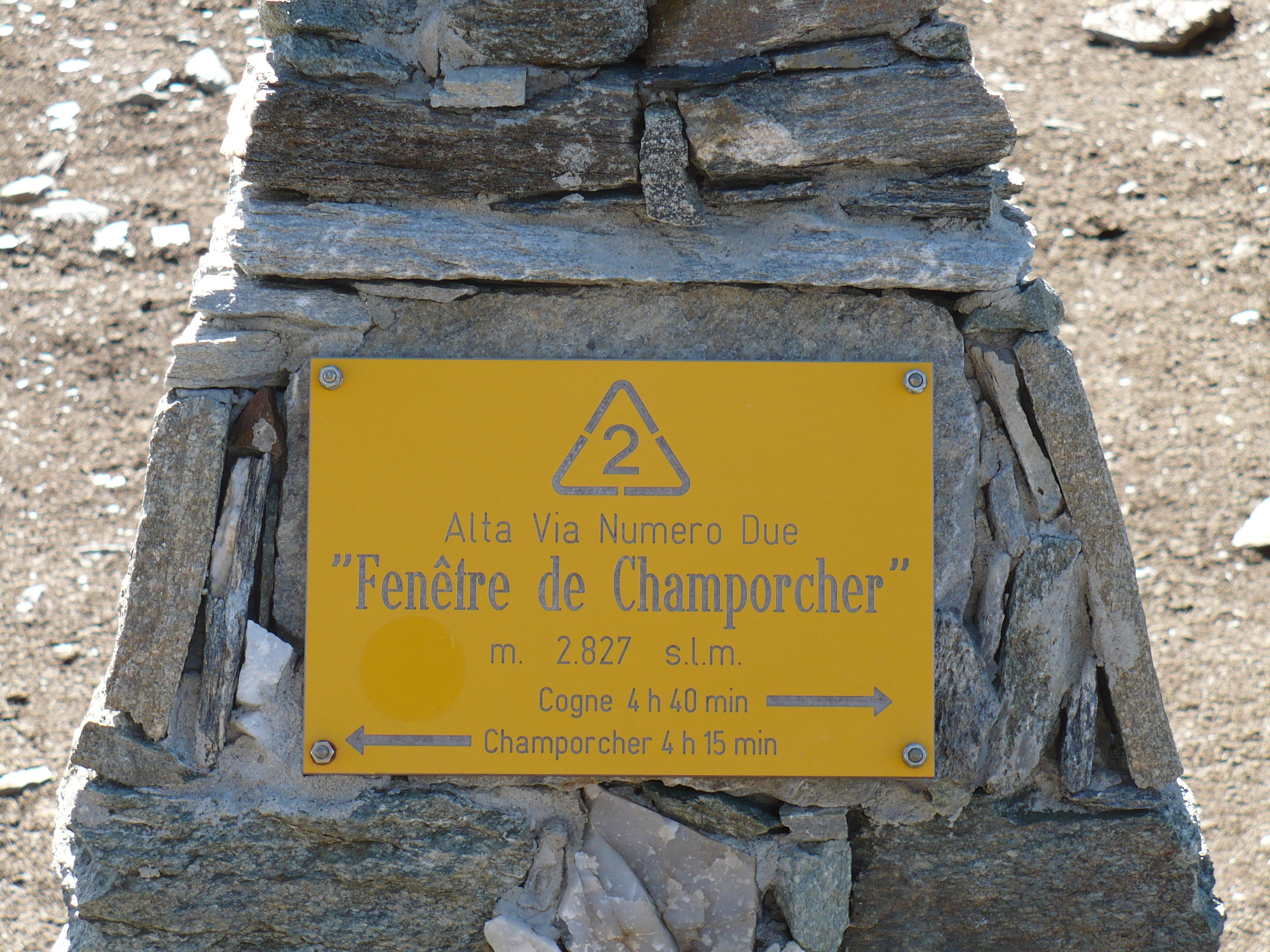
Trail sign on the pass.
