= St Nicholas Church, Champorcher =

Saint Nicholas Church
- Chiesa di San Nicola (Italian); Église Saint-Nicholas (French)
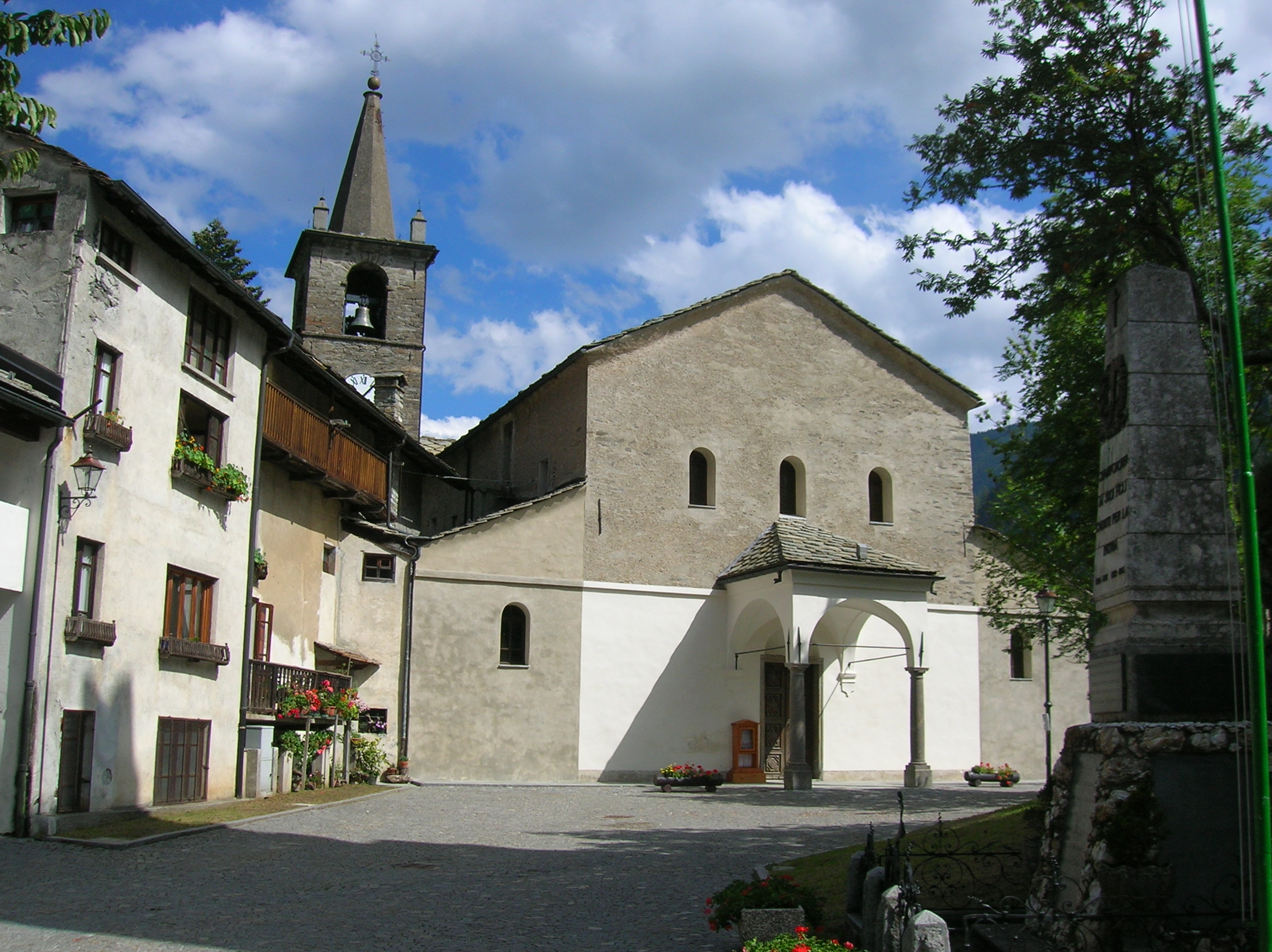
- San Nicola, Champorcher in 2011
- Click on the map for a fullscreen view
- 45°37′22.57″N 7°37′23.11″E
- Location: Champorcher
- Country: Italy
- Denomination: Roman Catholic

Architecture
- Functional status: Active

Administration
- Diocese: Diocese of Aosta

The Saint Nicholas Church (Italian: Chiesa parrocchiale di San Nicola; French: Église paroissiale Saint-Nicolas) is a Roman Catholic church located in Champorcher, Italy.

== History ==
The earliest record of the church dates back to 1176, when it was mentioned in Pope Alexander III’s papal bull among the churches under the authority of the Bishop of Aosta. At that time, the building corresponded to the chapel attached to the nearby Bard castle.

Over the centuries, the church underwent several alterations and renovations. A first major reconstruction took place in 1532, while in 1728 the building was enlarged under the supervision of Giovanni Ferro (Jean Fer), a Valsesian master builder who was responsible for numerous works on religious buildings throughout the Aosta Valley. The high altar was completed in 1741, while the two side aisles and their corresponding altars were added between 1864 and 1868.

== Description ==
Located in the village of Château, the church features a three-nave layout.

Inside, it houses a majestic Baroque high altar made of carved, painted, gilded, and silvered wood.
