= Lillaz Falls =

Coordinates: 45°35′39″N 7°23′50″E

- Cascate di Lillaz (Italian); Cascade de Lillaz (French)
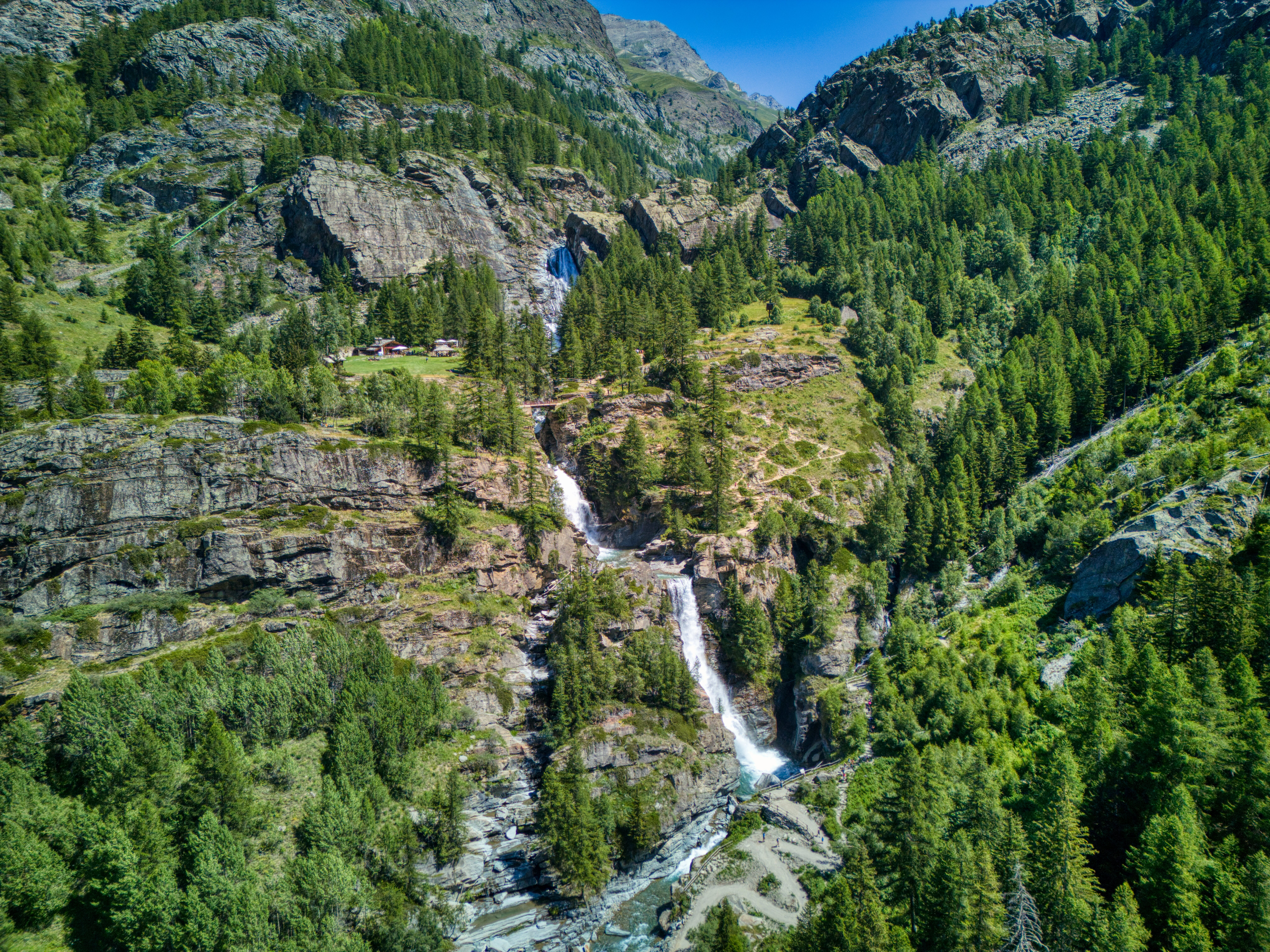
- Lillaz Falls in 2024
- Interactive map of Lillaz Falls
- Location: Cogne, Italy
- Total height: 150 m (490 ft)
- Number of drops: 3

The Lillaz Falls (French pronunciation: [lila]; Italian: Cascate di Lillaz; French: Cascades de Lillaz) is a waterfall along the Urtier river near Cogne in the Aosta Valley, Italy.

The waterfalls, located within the territory of the Gran Paradiso National Park, consist of three main drops with a total height of approximately 150 m (490 ft). They are accessible via a trail.
