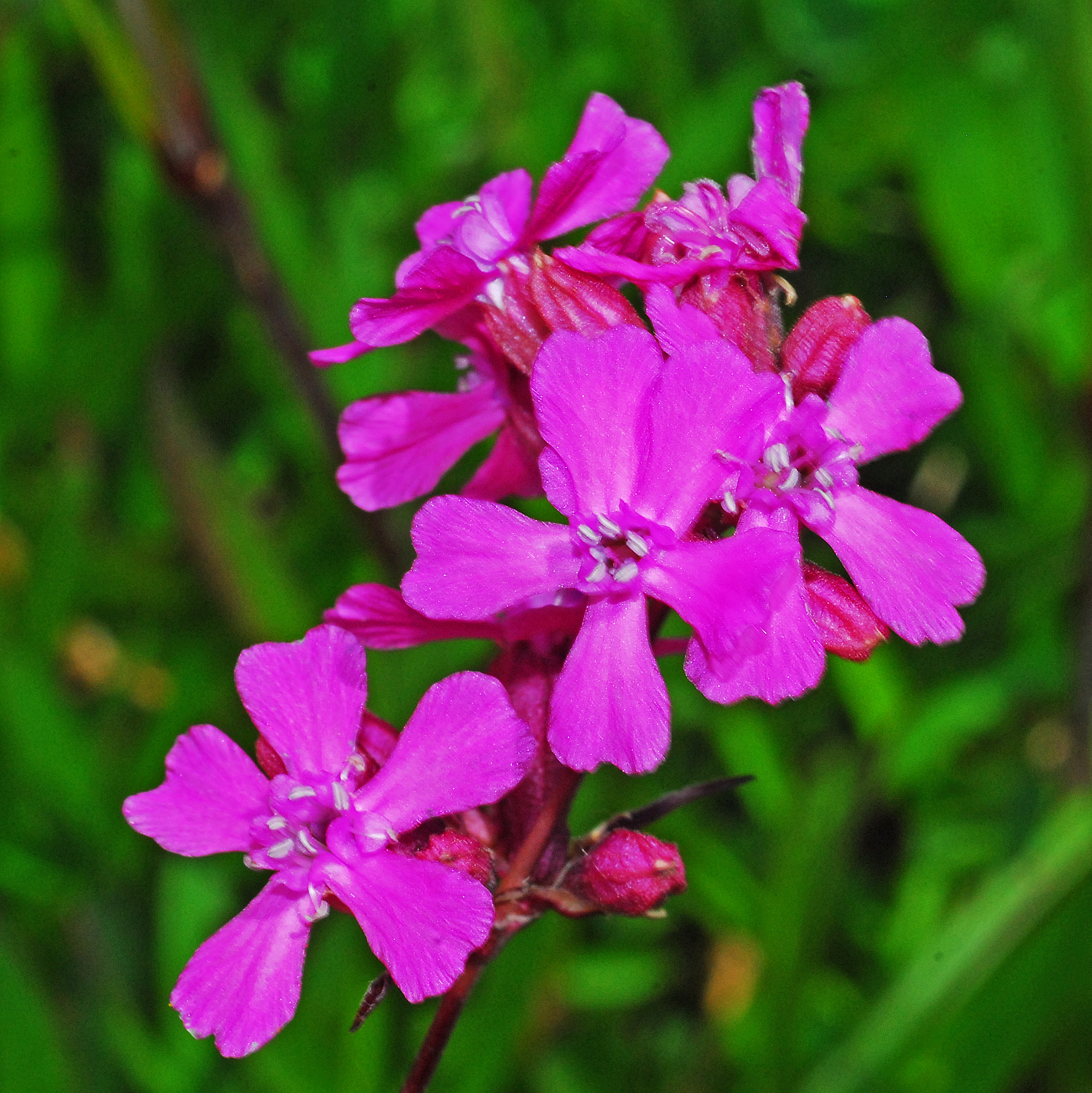
- Flowers of Silene samojedorum at the Giardino Botanico Alpino Chanousia

Scientific classification
- Kingdom: Plantae
- Clade: Embryophytes
- Clade: Tracheophytes
- Clade: Spermatophytes
- Clade: Angiosperms
- Clade: Eudicots
- Order: Caryophyllales
- Family: Caryophyllaceae
- Genus: Silene
- Species: S. samojedorum

Binomial name
- Silene samojedorum (Sambuk) Oxelman

Synonyms
- List: Lychnis yunnanensis; Baker f. Agrostemma sibirica; (L.) G.Don Coronaria sibirica; (L.) Graebn Lychnis samojedorum; (Sambuk) Gorschk Lychnis sibirica; L. Lychnis sibirica subsp. samojedorum; Sambuk Lychnis yunnanensis; Baker f. Melandrium sibiricum; (L.) A.Braun 'Silene linnaeana; Vorosch.

= Silene samojedorum =

Species of flowering plant

Silene samojedorum is a flowering plant in the family Caryophyllaceae.

== Distribution ==
This species is present in Russia, Western Siberia, Central Siberia and Russian Far East.

== Description ==
Silene samojedorum is a perennial herbaceous plant with showy pink flowers. It can reach a height of about 25–30 cm (9.8–11.8 in). The flowering time lasts from late spring to late summer.

== Bibliography ==
- Flora of China Editorial Committee. 2001. Flora of China (Caryophyllaceae through Lardizabalaceae). 6: 1–512. In C. Y. Wu, P. H. Raven & D. Y. Hong (eds.) Fl. China. Science Press & Missouri Botanical Garden Press, Beijing & St. Louis
- Malyschev, L.I. & Peschkova, G.A. (eds.) (2003). Flora of Siberia 6: 1–301. Scientific Publishers, Inc., Enfield, Plymouth.
- Tutin, T.G. & al. (eds.) (1993). Flora Europaea ed. 2, 1: 1–581. Cambridge University Press.
