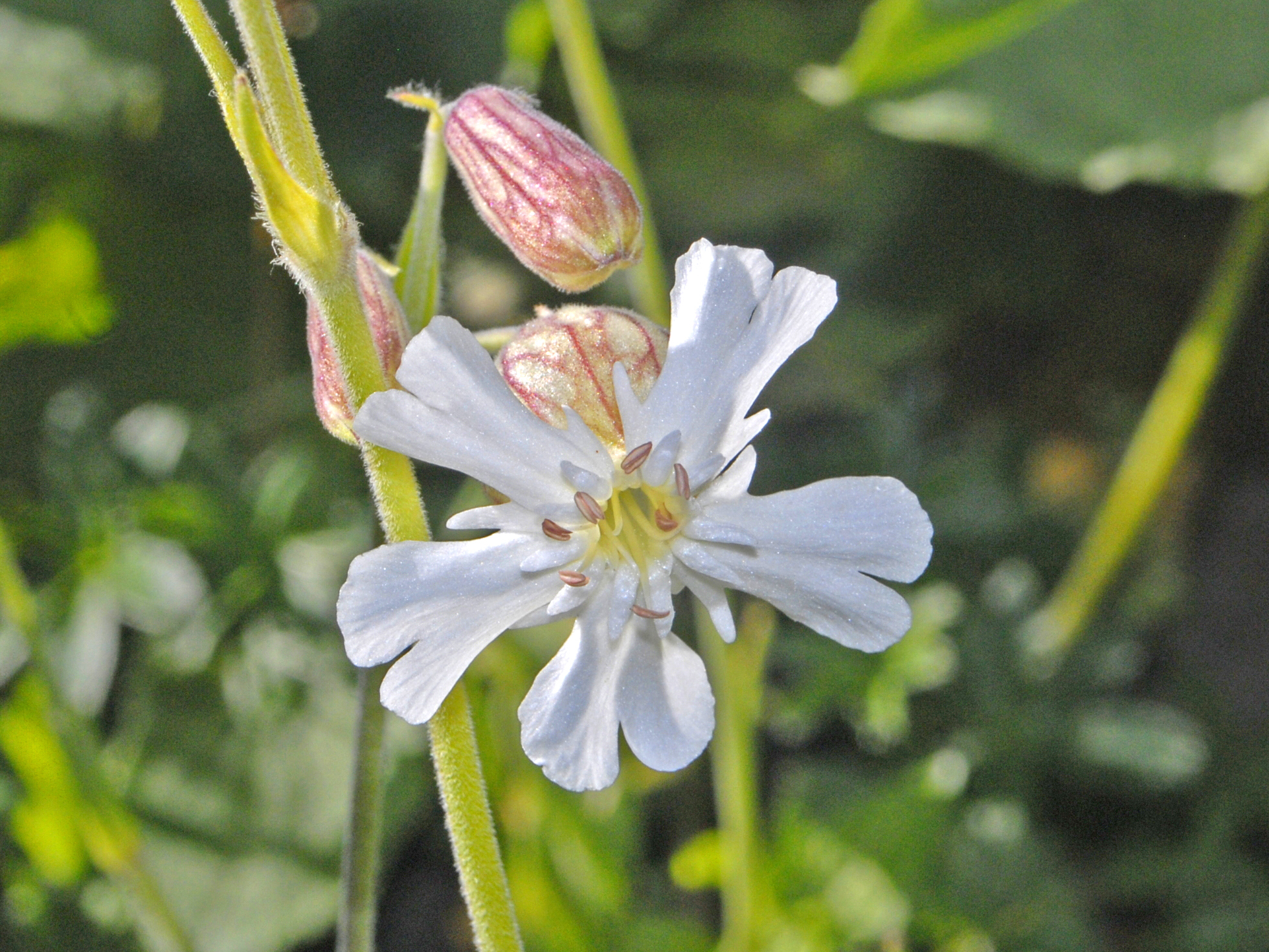
- Flower of Silene caucasica at the Giardino Botanico Alpino Chanousia

Scientific classification
- Kingdom: Plantae
- Clade: Tracheophytes
- Clade: Angiosperms
- Clade: Eudicots
- Order: Caryophyllales
- Family: Caryophyllaceae
- Genus: Silene
- Species: S. caucasica

Binomial name
- Silene caucasica (Bunge) Boiss.

Synonyms
- Silene tatjanae Schischk.

= Silene caucasica =

Species of plant in the carnation family

Silene caucasica is a species of flowering plant in the family Caryophyllaceae. It is native to Transcaucasia and Turkey.

== Sources ==
- Nersesian, A. A., Goukasian, A.G. - On the karyology of the representatives of the genus Silene L. s. l. (Caryophyllaceae) from southern Transcaucasia. – Publ. in Flora Orientalis 1: 622. 1867.
- Biolib
- Tropicos
- Euromed
