= Gimillan =

Coordinates: 45°37′00″N 7°21′33″E

- Frazione
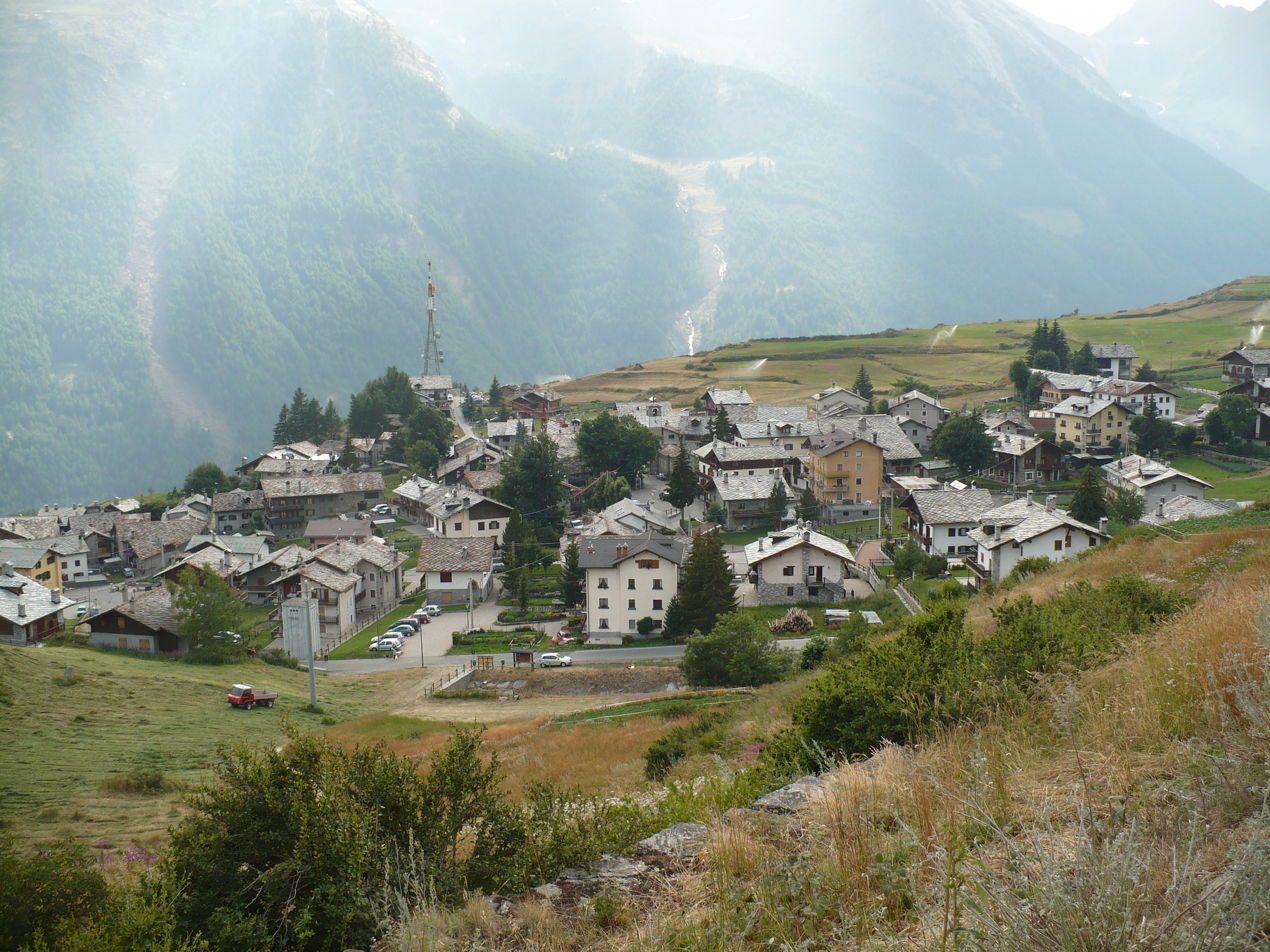
- Interactive map of Gimillan
- Country: Italy
- Region: Aosta Valley
- Province: none
- Commune: Cogne
- Time zone: UTC+1 (CET)
  - Summer (DST): UTC+2 (CEST)

Gimillan French pronunciation is a frazione of Cogne, in the Aosta Valley region of Italy. It is located about 3 km from Cogne, on a side hill of the Cogne Valley.

Saint Pantaleon is the patron saint of the town.

== Gallery ==
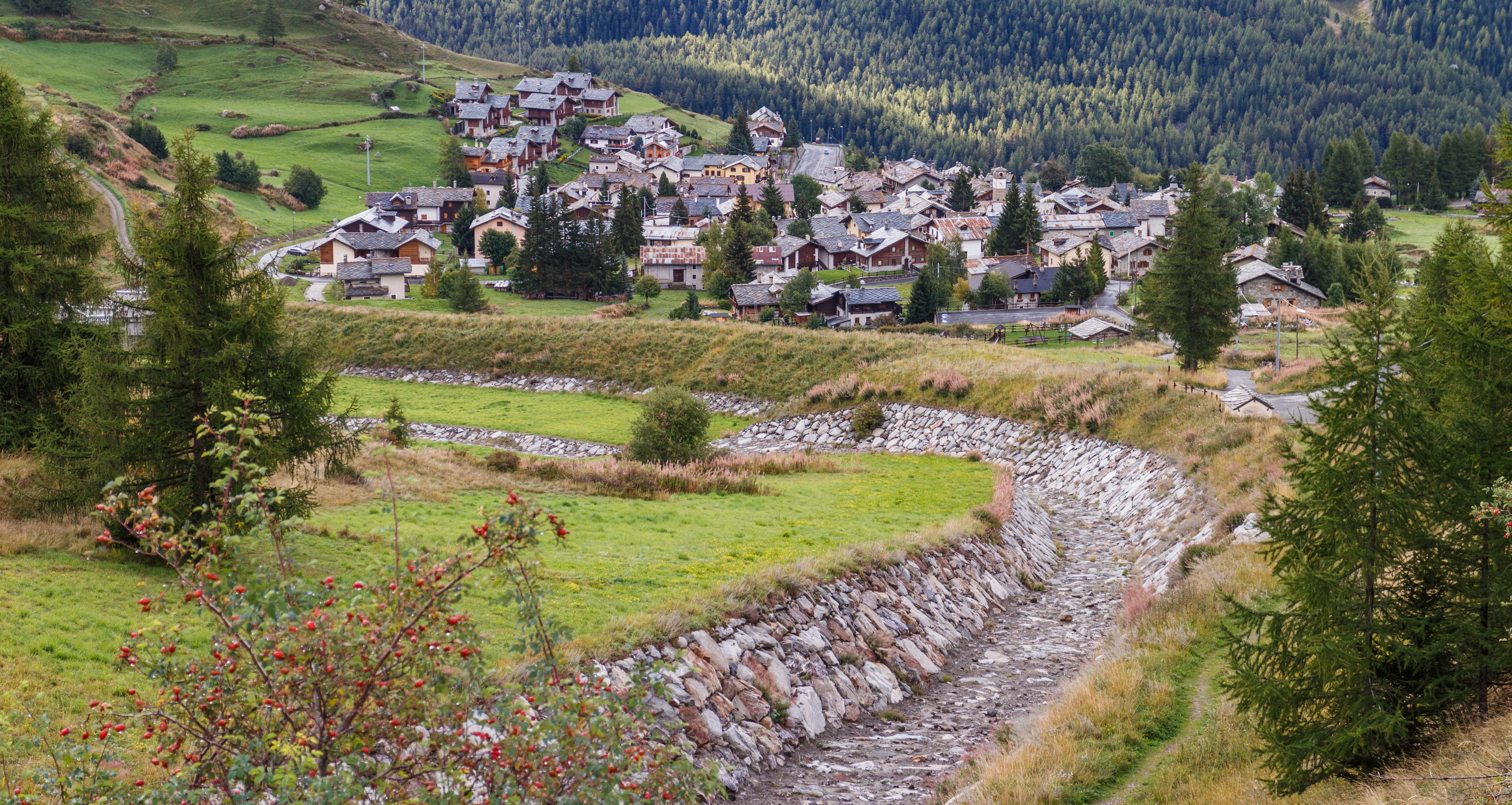
View of Gimillan

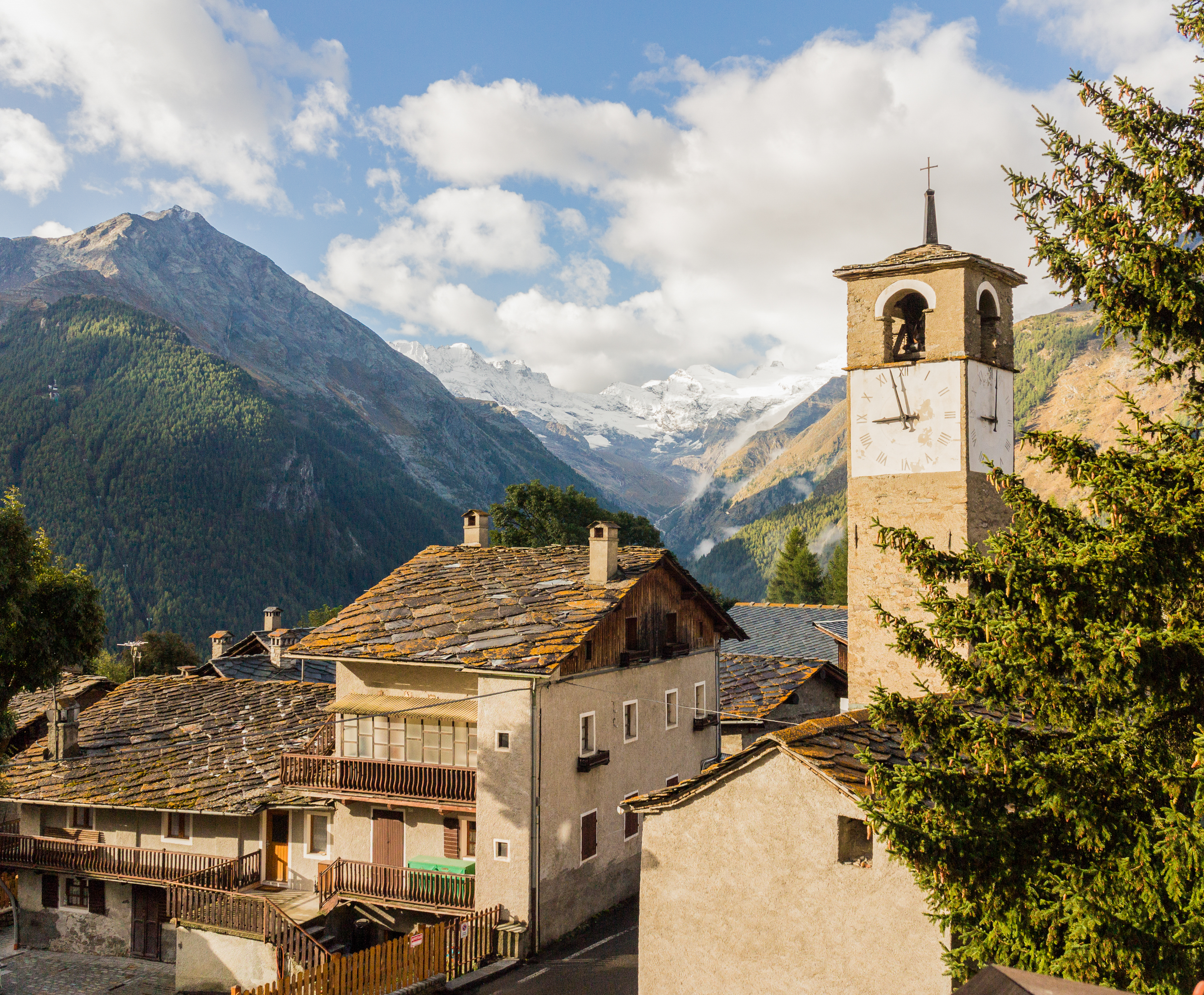
Church of Saint Pantaléon

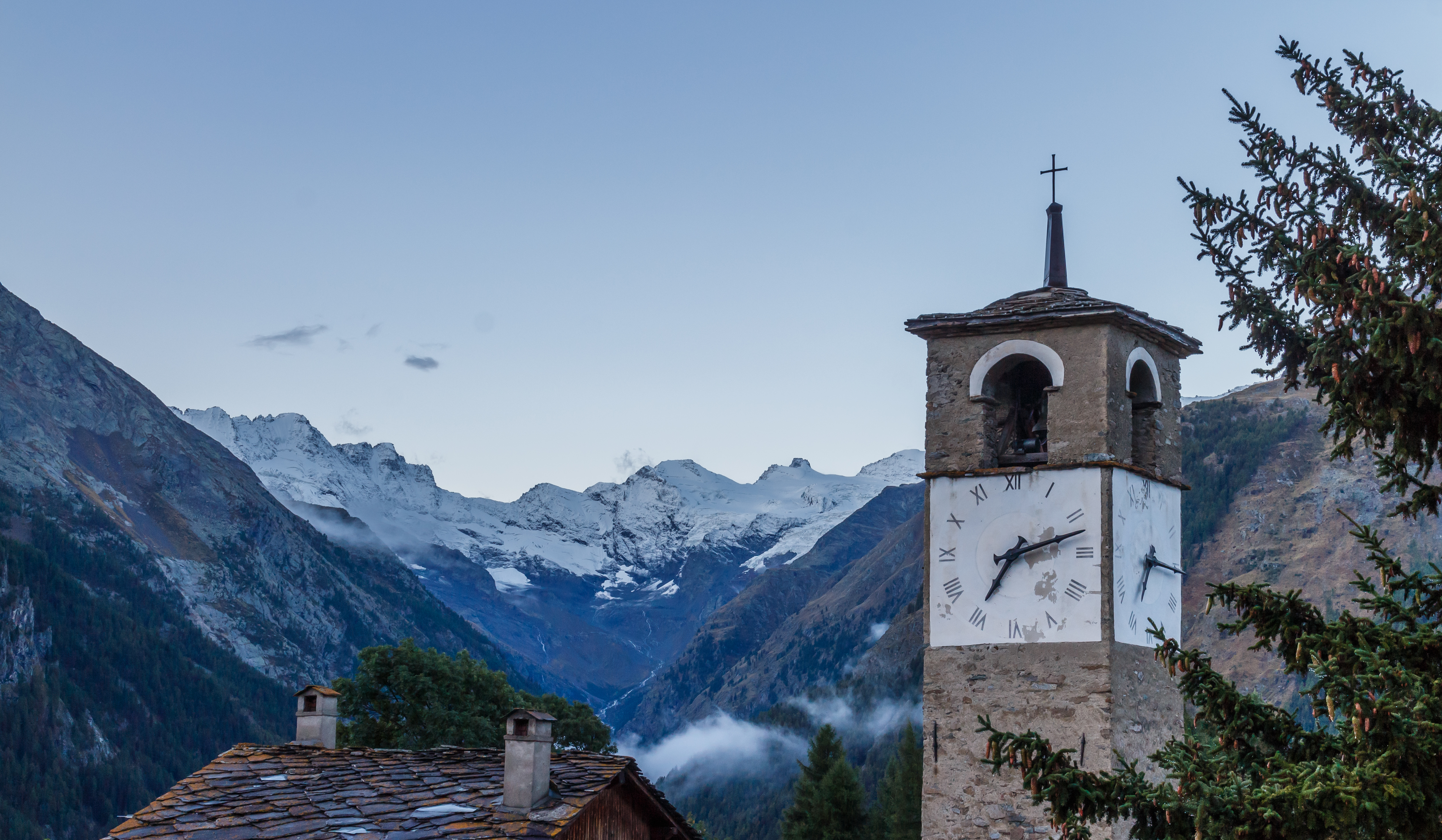
Tower of the church

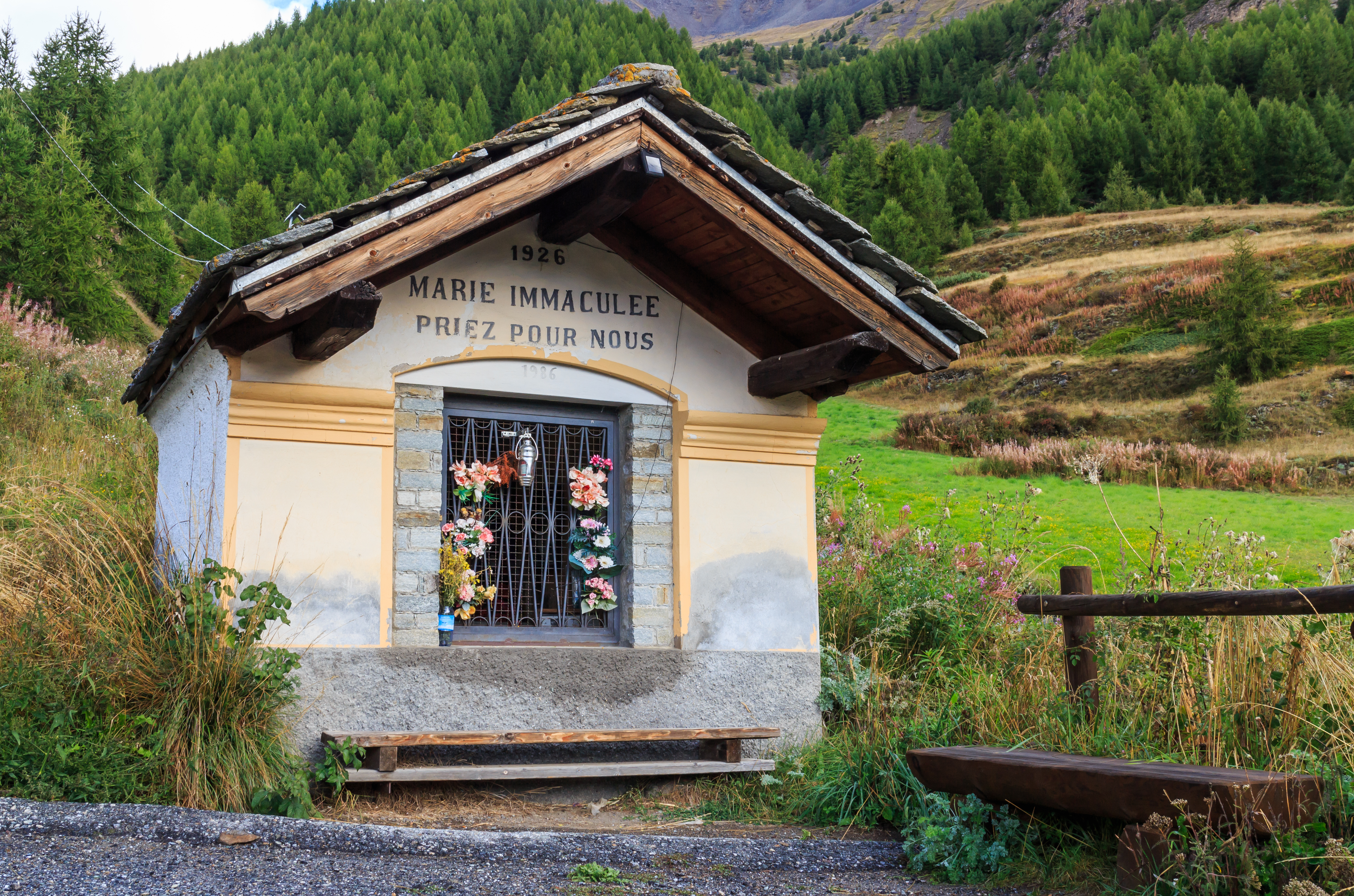
A chapel of 1926 above Gimillan

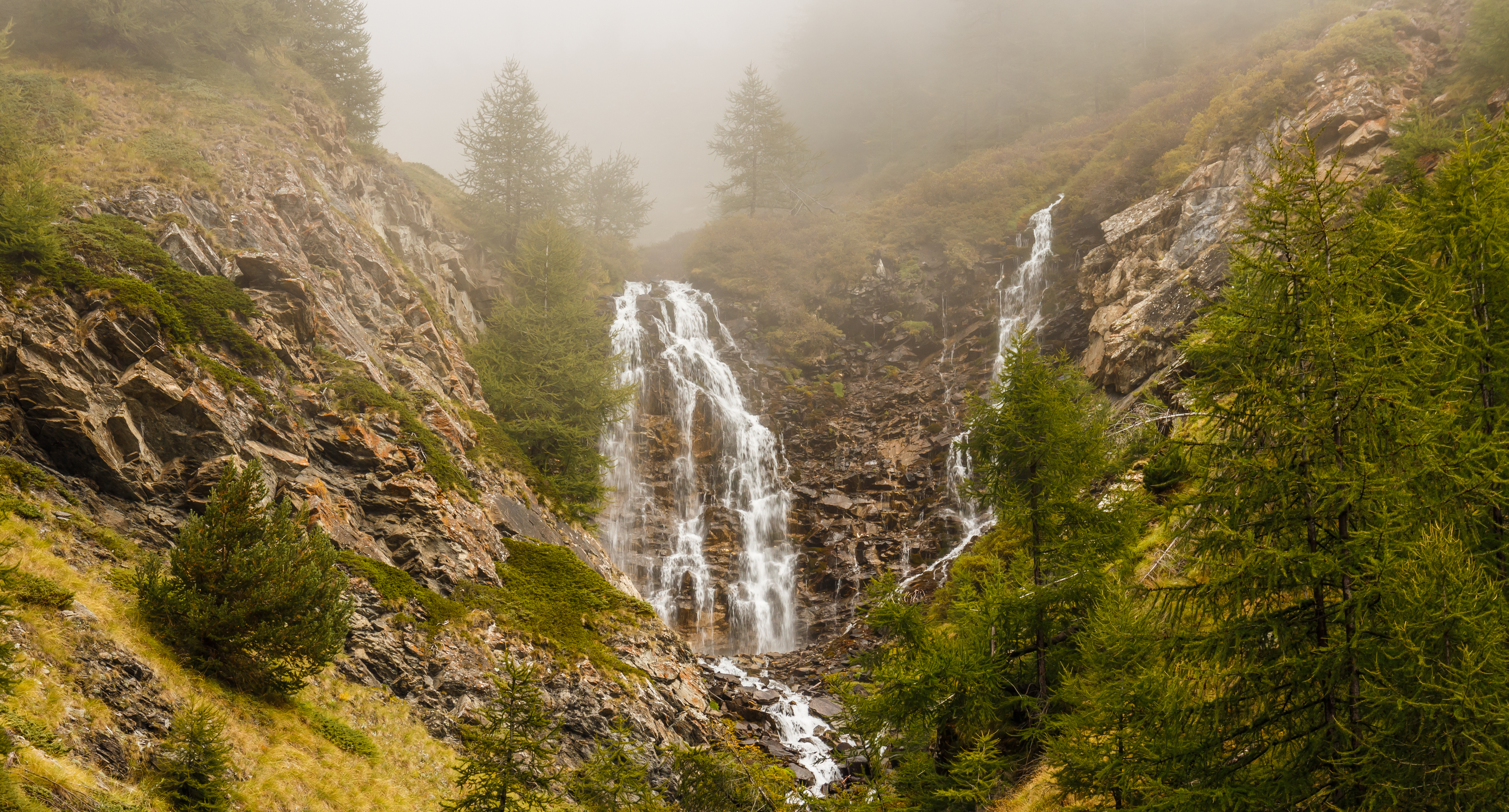
A waterfall above Gimillan
