= Rosa dei Banchi =

Mountain in Italy

- French: Rose des bancs
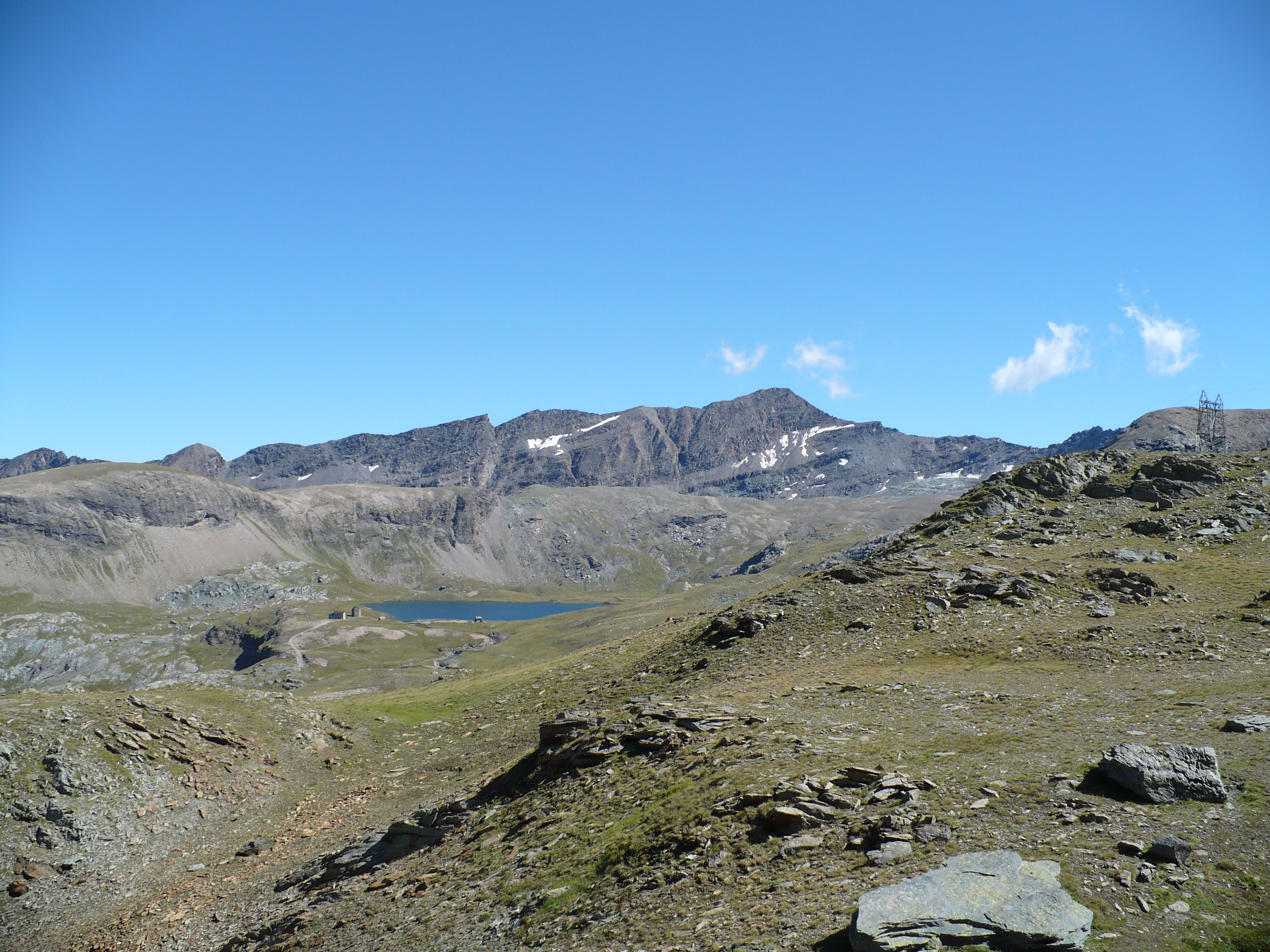
- Rosa dei Banchi and Lake Misérin

Highest point
- Elevation: 3,164 m (10,381 ft)
- Coordinates: 45°34′38″N 7°31′56″E

Geography
- Location within Alps
- Location: Province of Turin, Italy; Aosta Valley, Italy

Rosa dei Banchi (French: Rose des Bancs) is a 3,164 m (10,381 ft) tall mountain of the Graian Alps in northern Italy. Its summit lies on the boundary between the municipalities of Champorcher in the Aosta Valley and Valprato Soana in Piedmont, Italy.

== Description ==
Rosa dei Banchi rises on the watershed between the Champorcher Valley, in the Aosta Valley, and the Campiglia Valley and the Piamprato Valley, in Piedmont. From the summit, a ridge extends southward, separating the Campiglia and Piamprato valleys.

The summit coincides with the Italian Military Geographic Institute geodetic triangulation point known as Rosa dei Banchi (code 042099).

== Etymology ==
The mountain's name derives from the French form Rose des Bancs, which was later Italianized as Rosa dei Banchi. The French name itself originates from the Valdôtain toponym Roése di bantse, where roése means "glacier" and bantse refers to glacial ledges.

== SOIUSA classification ==
According to the SOIUSA (International Standardized Mountain Subdivision of the Alps) the mountain can be classified in the following way:

- main part = Western Alps
- major sector = North Western Alps
- section = Graian Alps
- subsection = Alpi del Gran Paradiso
- supergroup = Gruppo della Rosa dei Banchi
- group = Nodo della Rosa dei Banchi
