= Lino Vaccari =

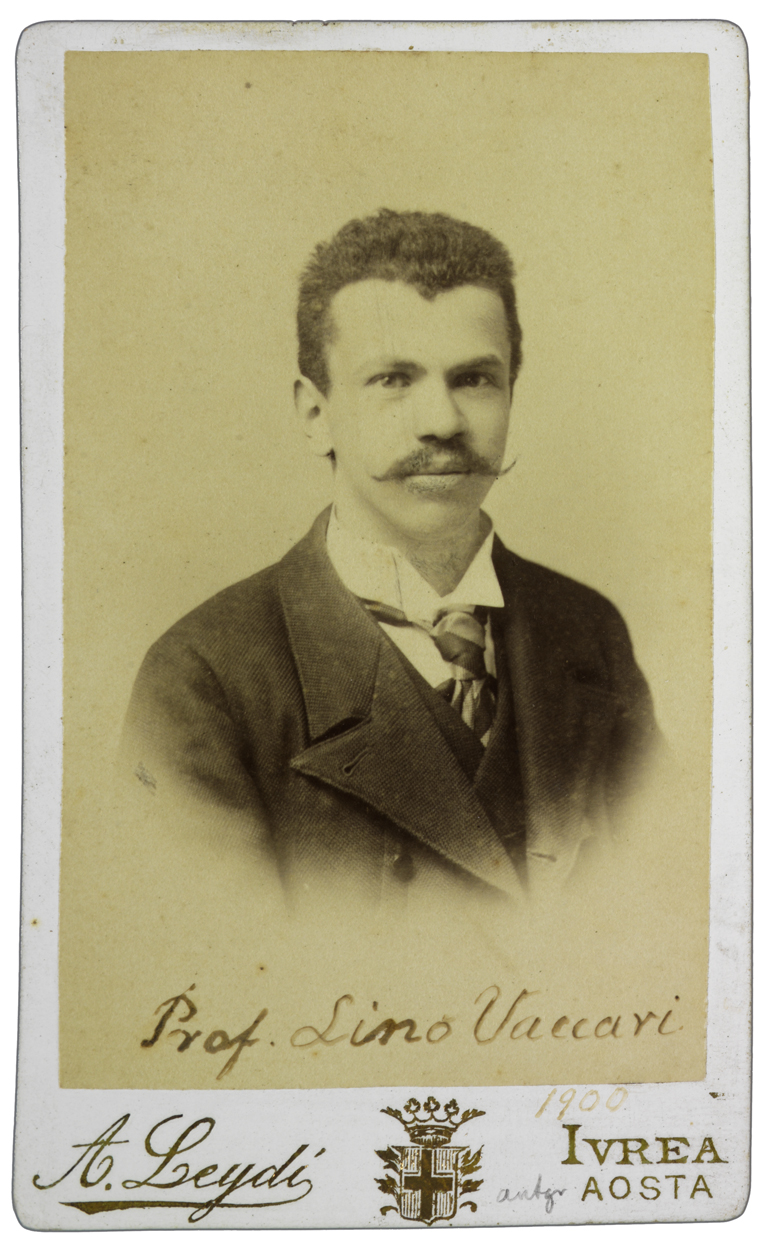
Carte-de-viste, 1900

Lino Vaccari (23 August 1873 – 20 January 1951) was an Italian botanist who studied alpine plants and was also involved in conservation efforts. He was a director of an alpine garden that later became the Chanousia Alpine Botanical Garden.

== Life and work ==
Vaccari was born in Crespano del Grappa, Treviso, and became interested in the natural sciences at an early age. He travelled in the mountains, especially near Monte Grappa, and became a private tutor. He began to create a herbarium of the local flora and was praised by the Bassanese Alpine Club. He went to the University of Padua and graduated in 1896 with a thesis on the morphology and systematics of Italian gentians. He taught at the Aosta high school from 1896 to 1902 and in his spare time examined the plants of the Aosta Valley. While living in Aosta he met Abbot Pierre Chanoux and worked with him to establish the gardens which later became the Chanousia Alpine Botanical Garden. He was involved in efforts to protect the alpine flora. He then worked at a number of schools shifting from Tivoli to Florence and finally Rome. At Rome he also lectured on botany at the University of Rome. He became a director of the Chanousia Botanical Garden in 1909 and worked there until 1943. He died in Rome in 1951, bequeathing his herbarium and photographs (nearly 4300 glass negatives) to the University of Rome.
