= Hône =

Hône Ouna/Vión-a (Valdôtain) Ounu (Walser)
- Comune
- Comune di Hône; Commune de Hône
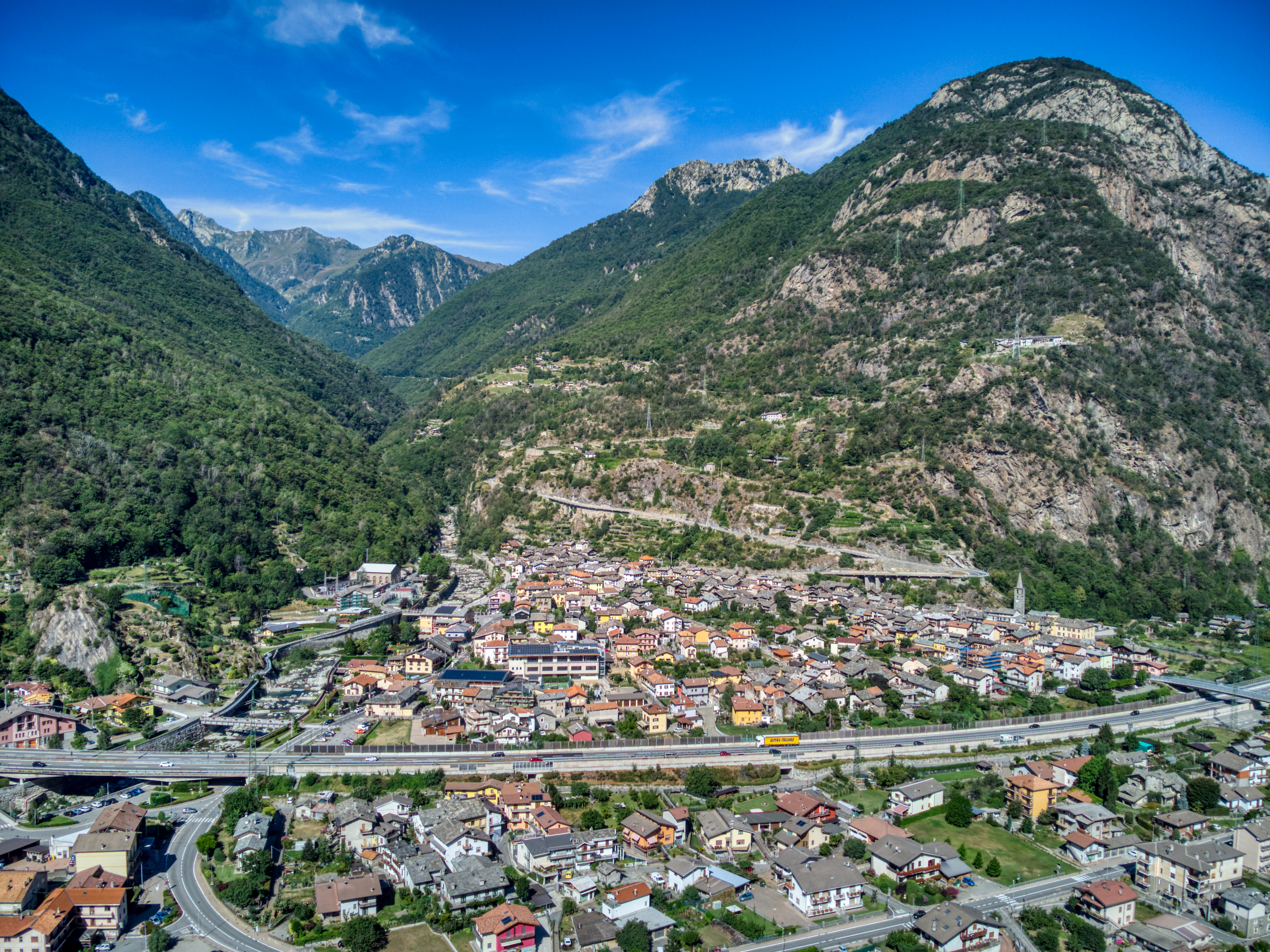

- Location within Italy Location within Aosta Valley
- Coordinates: 45°37′N 7°44′E
- Country: Italy
- Region: Aosta Valley
- Province: none
- Frazioni: L'Adret, Barge, La Barmaz, Les Barrières, Biel, Le Bois-Vuillermoz, Bourche, Bren, Champcorcher, Le Chanton, Charvaz, La Clévaz, Closallaz, Le Col-de-Courtil, Cougnin, La Cournou, Courtalès, Courtil, La Croisettaz, Crou du Tor, Folliasses, Fontaney, Le Glairet, Le Gourbelu, Le Grand-Château, Grangettes, Les Grissettes, Les Grisses, La Guiaz, La Lientaz, Longue-Toise, Messec, Maison-Blanche, Le Nerey, Les Orfolliey, Parchet, Planas, Plan-Fiou, Plan-Palas, Plan-Priod, Pountoulet, Pourcil, Prarion, Préle, Le Pré-du-Roux, Le Raffor, Recours, Le Revers, Le Ronc, Les Roncs, Ronfiot, La Ruine, Serec, La Serre-de-Biel, Séville, Travelec, Le Chaté, Champagne-d'Hône, La Chantelou, Chapelle-Costaz, Les Valleilles, Vareynaz, Verfie, Vermy, Le Verney, Vers-les-Prés, Vers-Rionche

Area
  - Total: 12 km^{2} (4.6 sq mi)
- Elevation: 364 m (1,194 ft)

Population (31 December 2022)
  - Total: 1,140
  - Density: 95/km^{2} (250/sq mi)
- Demonym: Hônois
- Time zone: UTC+1 (CET)
  - Summer (DST): UTC+2 (CEST)
- Postal code: 11020
- Dialing code: 0125
- Patron saint: Saint George
- Saint day: 23 April
- Website: Official website

Hône (French: [on]; Valdôtain: Ouna (locally Vión-a); Issime Walser: Ounu) is a town and comune (population 1,146) in the Aosta Valley region of north-western Italy.

== Twin towns ==
- Nora Municipality, Sweden, since 2008
