= Valnontey =

Coordinates: 45°34′12″N 7°19′48″E

- Village
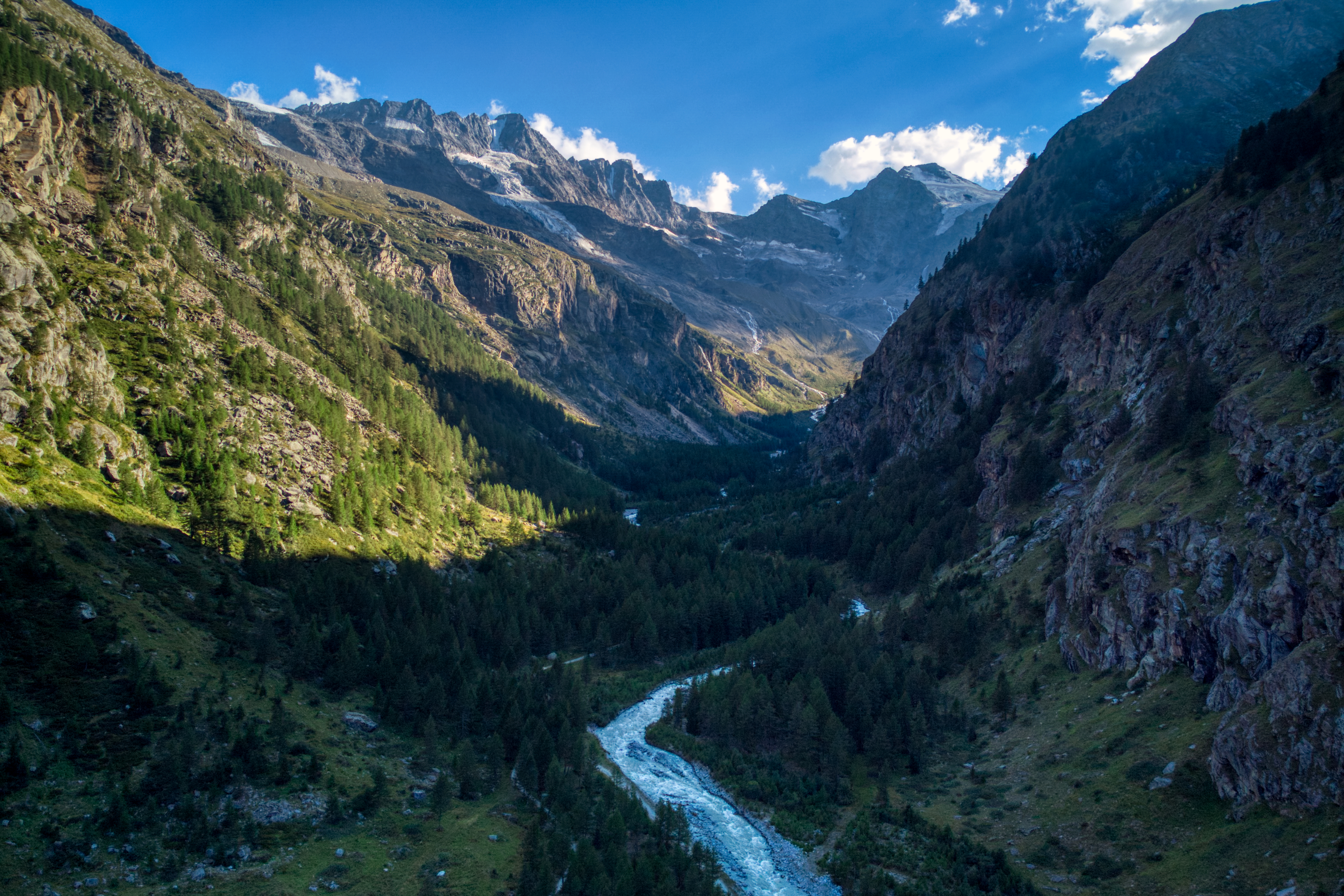
- Valnontey with the Gran Paradiso in the background
- Interactive map of Valnontey
- Country: Italy
- Region: Aosta Valley
- Province: none
- Commune: Cogne
- Elevation: 1,682 m (5,518 ft)
- Time zone: UTC+1 (CET)
  - Summer (DST): UTC+2 (CEST)

Valnontey is a small village of Cogne in Aosta Valley, the smallest region of Italy. It is completely within the Gran Paradiso National Park.
