= Pierre Chanoux =

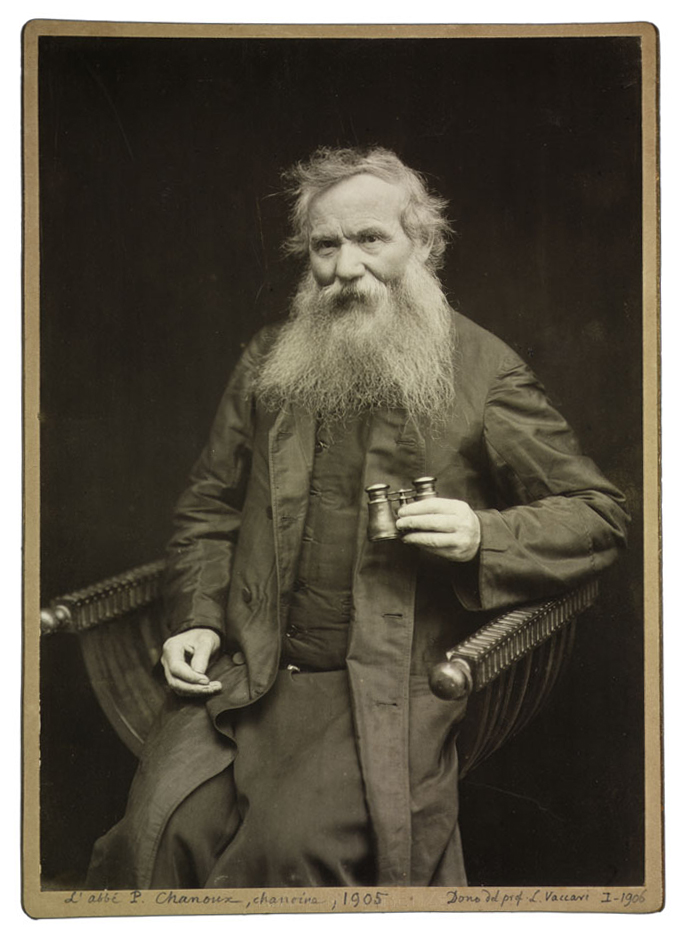
In 1905

Pierre Chanoux (1828 - 9 February 1909) was a Benedictine monk in charge of a mountain convent and hospice. He was an amateur botanist who started a garden of alpine plants, still maintained as the Chanousia Alpine Botanical Garden located at 2170 meters altitude near Mont Blanc, at the Little St Bernard Pass in France, but maintained by the frontier Italian commune of La Thuile (Aosta Valley).

== Biography ==
Pierre was born in Champorcher, in the Aosta Valley, to a poor family of shepherds. In 1845, he began studies in Aosta, soon joining the seminary and ordained in 1855. He entered the Order of Saints Maurice and Lazarus, which included a religious, previously militant, but later Benedictine order linked to the House of Savoy, and was initially assigned to Valgrisenche until 1859. By 1860 he was named rector of the hospice of Little St Bernard. There he would erect structures aimed at popularizing the zone and hospice. He made payment for stays voluntary. He added a small astronomic observatory, and collected archeologic and geologic items from the area. But his links to the botanist Lino Vaccari (1873 – 1951), aided his interest in botanical collection and cultivation, in part seeking to increase the ability of these regions to serve agriculture. He also had a Franciscan urging to protect local fauna. He received funds for his Chanousia Alpine Botanical Garden (founded in 1897) from his religious order and the Ministry of Agriculture. In the last years of his life, he was accused by authorities of fostering illegal smuggling across the frontier. After Chanoux's death, it was directed by Vaccari, who edited some of Chanoux's manuscripts. However, the wars of the twentieth century were not helpful for the garden or hospice.

== Hospice at Little Saint Bernard ==
A hospice on the Italian side of the border, located at 2200 meters above sea level, had been erected at this pass in the 11th century by Bernard of Menthon, later canonized. On the French side of the border are ruins of an Ancient Roman mansio or putative mansion are located just north of the border. South along D1090 is the botanical garden and a small funerary chapel and monument dedicated to Chanoux. The convent, based on the passage now known of Little St Bernard, included a hospice that ministered to pilgrims travelling mainly to Rome. Originally autonomous, the hospice was assigned to the order of the Chamoines (Abbey of Saint-Maurice d'Agaune) in 1466, and by the 19th century to the Order of Saints Maurice and Lazarus. During the Second World War, the hospice was partially destroyed, it was forced to close. It was restored in 1993 with funds and work from religious, community, and public groups from France and Italy. Since 2014, the building again began providing food and lodging, mostly to individuals trekking through the alps.
