= Mont Glacier =

Mountain in Italy

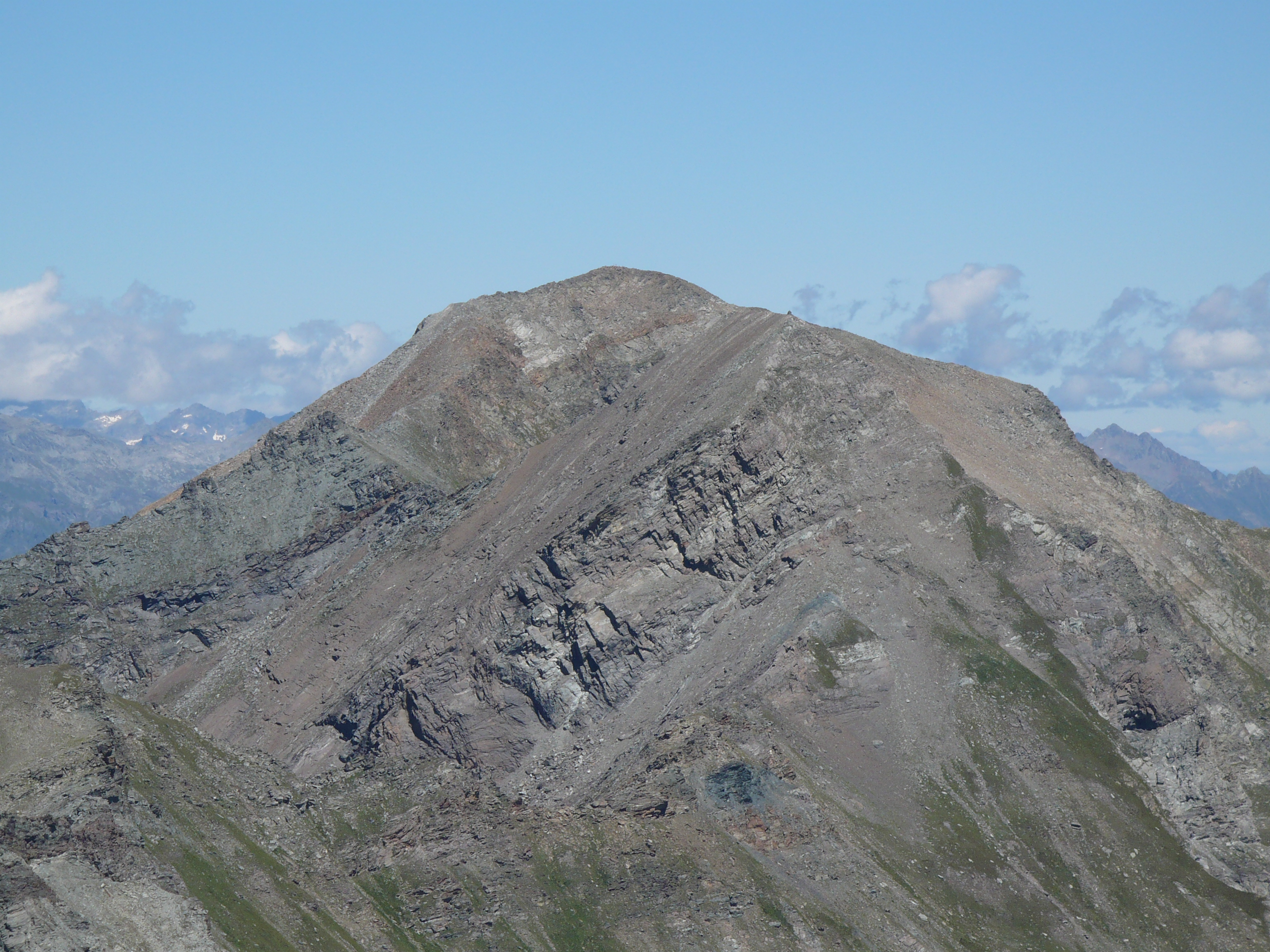
- Mont Glacier

Highest point
- Elevation: 3,185 m (10,449 ft)
- Listing: Alpine mountains above 3000 m
- Coordinates: 45°37′54″N 7°32′22″E

Geography
- Location within Alps
- Location: Aosta Valley, Italy
- Parent range: Graian Alps

Mont Glacier is a mountain in the Graian Alps, in the Aosta Valley, north-western Italy, approximately 30 km / 19 miles for the border with Switzerland. It has an elevation of 3,185 m.

Part of the Gran Paradiso Massif, it commands the Champorcher Valley and the Champdepraz Valley, representing their highest peak.
