= Refuge Dondénaz =

Refuge in the Alps in Aosta Valley, Italy

Coordinates: 45°36′43″N 7°33′06″E

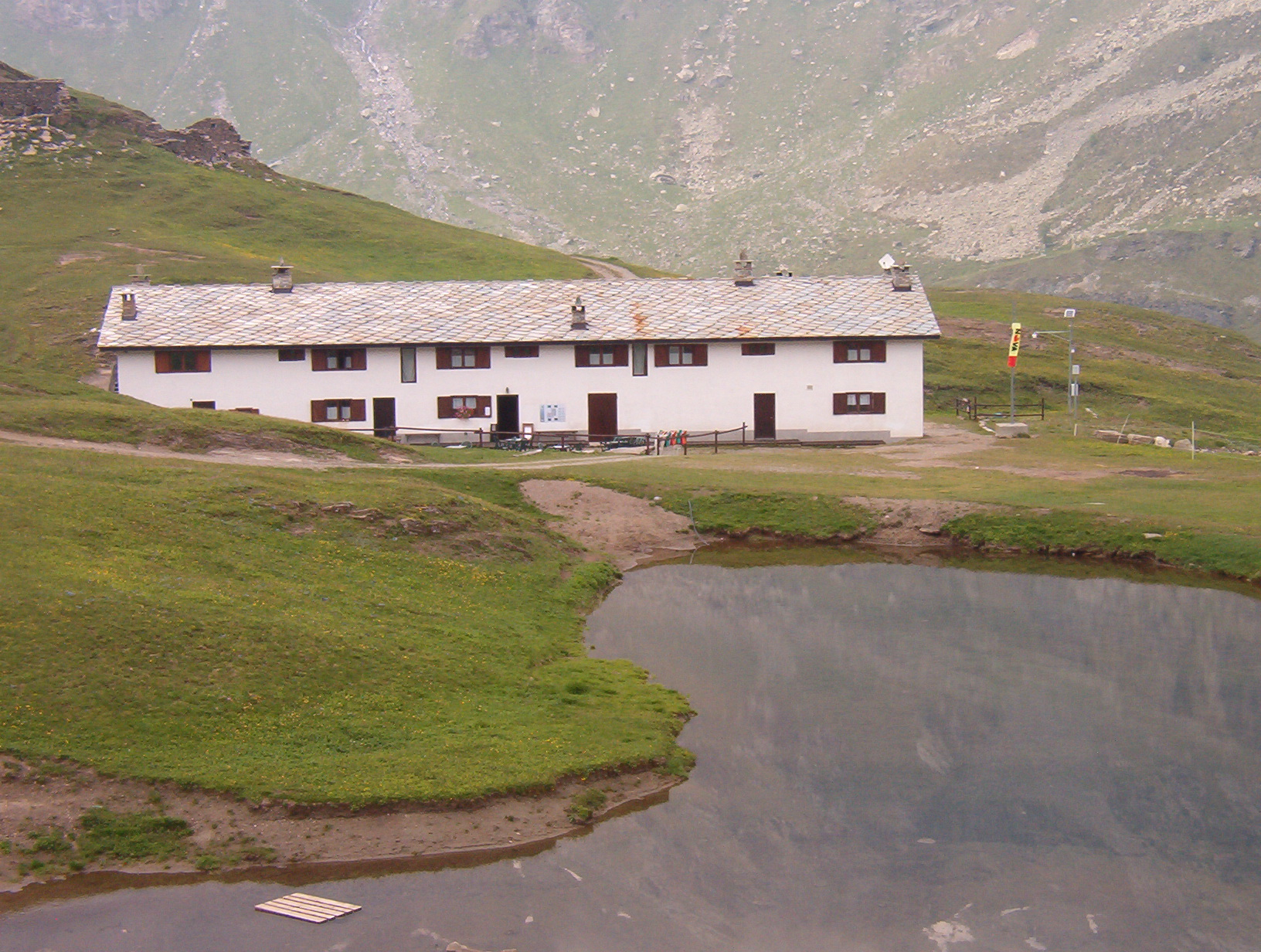
Refuge Dondénaz

Refuge Dondénaz is a refuge in the Alps in Aosta Valley, Italy.
