= Chanousia Alpine Botanical Garden =

Alpine botanical garden in La Thuile, Aosta Valley

Coordinates: 45.6803°N 6.8839°E

The Chanousia Alpine Botanical Garden (Italian: Giardino Botanico Alpino Chanousia, French: Jardin alpin botanique Chanousia) (about 10,000 m^{2}) is an alpine botanical garden located at 2170 meters altitude near Mont Blanc, at the Little St Bernard Pass. Though located in France, it belongs to the Italian commune of La Thuile (Aosta Valley). It was founded by Valdostan abbot and botanist Pierre Chanoux. It is open daily in the warmer months.

The garden was first established in 1897 by Abbot Pierre Chanoux, and in its best years contained about 2500 species of mountain plants from the Alps and around the world. It was badly damaged during World War II, and restored starting in 1978. Today the garden contains about 1200 species which flourish in a short growing spell (two months) between heavy winters with snowfall ranging from 4–8 meters.

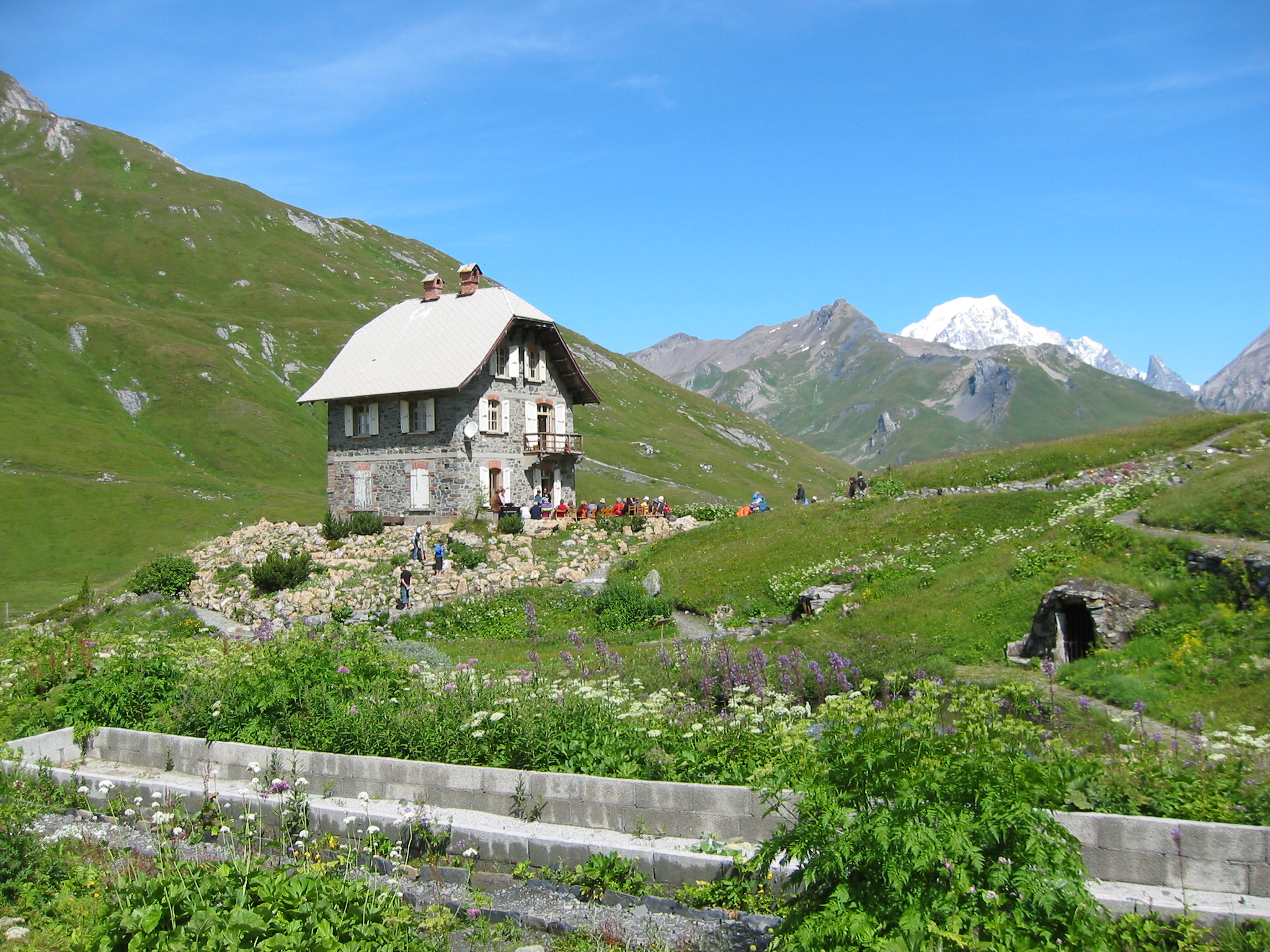
Chanousia Alpine Botanical Garden

== See also ==
- List of botanical gardens in Italy
