= Cogne =

Cogne Kunji (Walser)
- Comune
- Comune di Cogne; Commune de Cogne
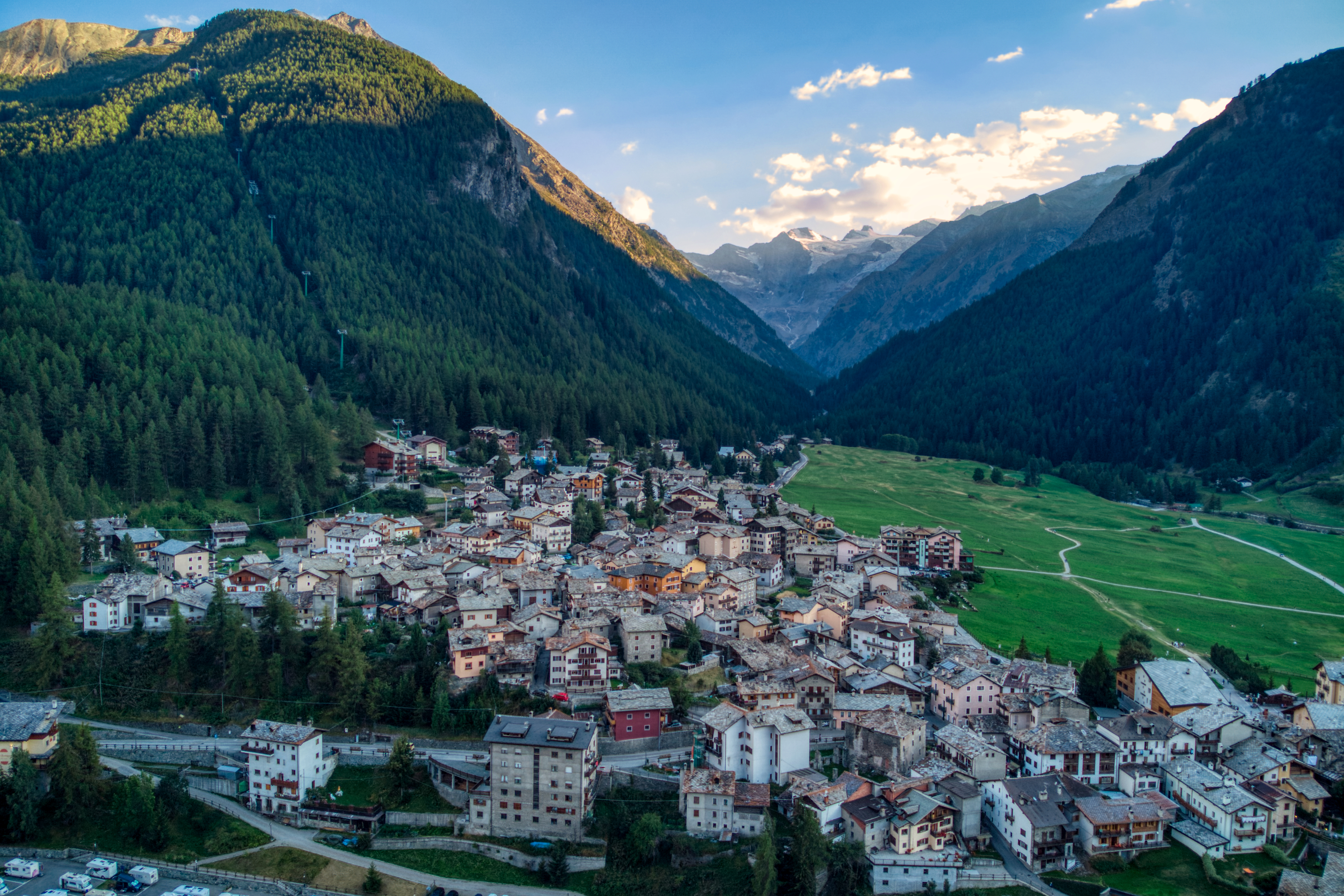

- Coat of arms

- Location within Italy Location within Aosta Valley
- Coordinates: 45°36′29″N 7°21′20″E
- Country: Italy
- Region: Aosta Valley
- Frazioni: Veulla, Boutillères, Champlong, Crétaz, Épinel, Gimillan, Moline, Montroz, Lillaz, Valnontey

Government
  - Mayor: Franco Allera

Area
  - Total: 212 km^{2} (82 sq mi)
- Elevation: 1,534 m (5,033 ft)

Population (31 December 2022)
  - Total: 1,320
  - Density: 6.23/km^{2} (16.1/sq mi)
- Demonym: Cogneins
- Time zone: UTC+1 (CET)
  - Summer (DST): UTC+2 (CEST)
- Postal code: 11012
- Dialing code: 0165
- Patron saint: Ursus of Aosta
- Saint day: 1 February
- Website: Official website

Cogne (French: [kɔɲ], Italian: [ˈkɔɲɲe]; Issime Walser: Kunji) is a town and comune (municipality) in Aosta Valley, northern Italy, with 1369 inhabitants, as of 2017.

== Geography ==
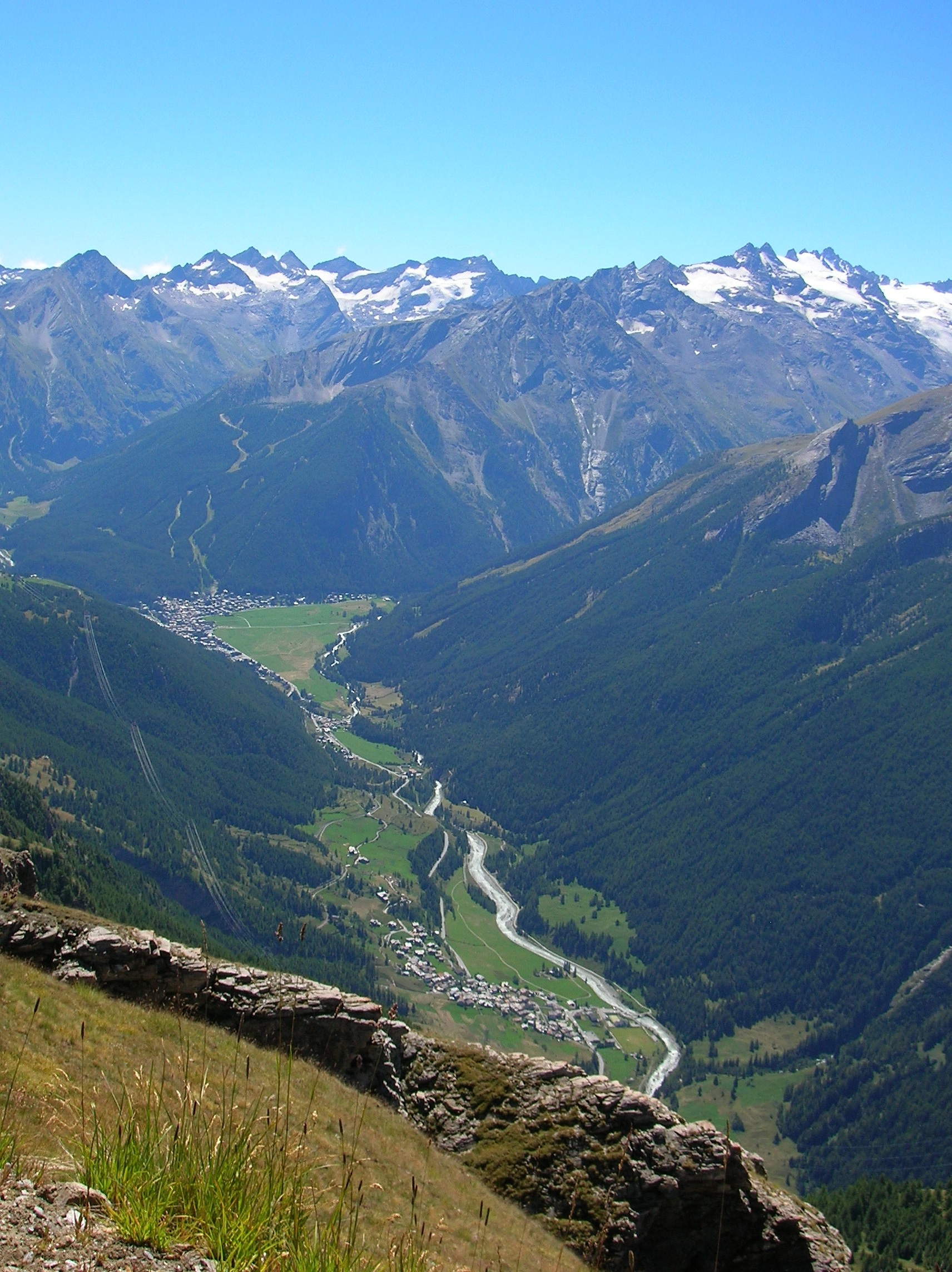
Panorama of the Cogne Valley in August 2015.

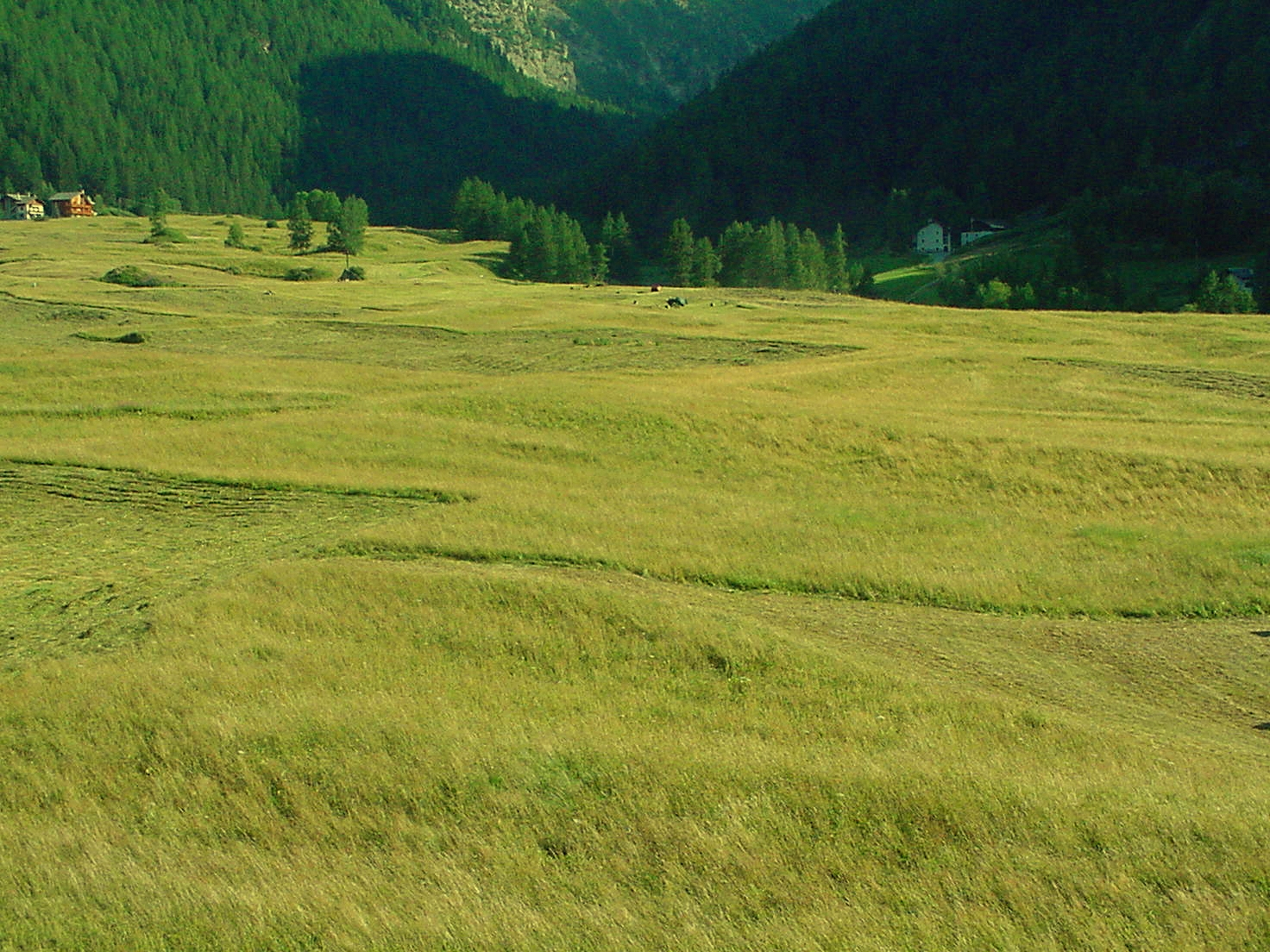
The St Ursus Meadow is still used to gather hay for livestock.

Cogne is located in the valley with the same name along a stream known as the Torrent Grand Eyvia. It is the largest municipality in the Aosta Valley. Cogne is 140 kilometres (87 mi) from Turin, 160 kilometres (99 mi) from Geneva and 26.5 kilometres (16.5 mi) from Aosta.

The town center of Cogne, called "Veulla" (meaning "town center" in the local Arpitan language), is surrounded by four valleys:

- South: the Valnontey valley, which leads to the slopes of Gran Paradiso;
- North: the Grauson valley;
- South-east, the Urtier valley and Valleille;
- East, the Gimillan valley.

A large meadow, known as the St Ursus Meadow (It. Prati di Sant'Orso; Fr. Prés de Saint-Ours), is located at the southern edge of the town center (webcam); the municipal statute forbids any construction works on this meadow, which has received recognition as a "Wonder of Italy".

== History ==
The population of Cogne originates from the Arpitane valleys of the Piedmont region. In the past, economic relations, and trade routes were directed to these valleys, using mule tracks and mountain passes, like the Rancio Pass or the Arietta Pass. The economic influence of the Aosta Valley is more recent.

Until the 1970s, Cogne was an important mining center for the extraction of iron ore. The main mineral veins were exploited in the mines of Colonne, Licony e Larsinaz. The ore (mainly magnetite) was transported for processing to the Cogne steel plant in Aosta using a narrow gauge railway. The mines were closed in 1979.

Recent natural disasters that have hit the region include the flood of 1993 and that of October 15, 2000, when more than 400 millimetres (16 in) of rain fell in two days, causing inundations and landslides.

== Sport ==
Cogne is an international center of cross country skiing and ice climbing, with 40 kilometres (25 mi) of trails and 150 ice falls. There are also 9 kilometres (6 mi) of downhill runs, many walks on the snow and more than 140 icefalls. During the summer, hiking and mountain biking are popular.

== Main sights ==
- Ibex, wild goat, marmots, royal eagles are easy to see. Many walks and hikes of different level, to lakes, waterfalls and other natural attraction.
- Paradisia Alpine Botanical Garden, an alpine botanical garden
- Pont d'Aël, a Roman aqueduct, now foot bridge nearby crossing the Cogne Valley more than 60 metres (200 ft) above the bottom

== Crime ==
Cogne was the seat of the Cogne Homicide.
