= Cogne Valley =

Valley in northern Italy

Coordinates: 45°37′30″N 7°19′30″E

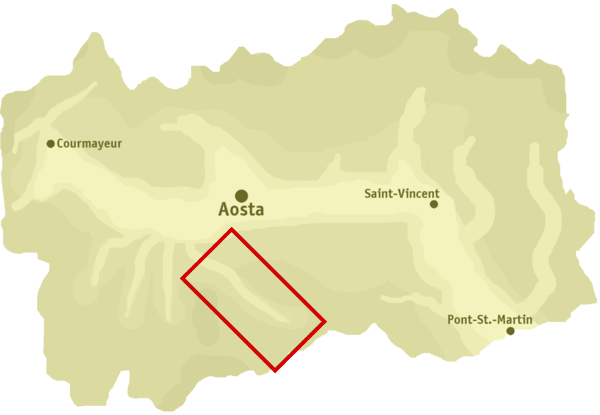
Position of the Cogne Valley within the Aosta Valley.

Val di Cogne (Italian) or Val de Cogne (French) - literally Cogne Valley - is a valley in the Aosta Valley, northern Italy.

== Toponym ==
The valley takes its name from Cogne, the municipality covering almost the entire part of it. Most of the valley is included in the Gran Paradiso National Park.

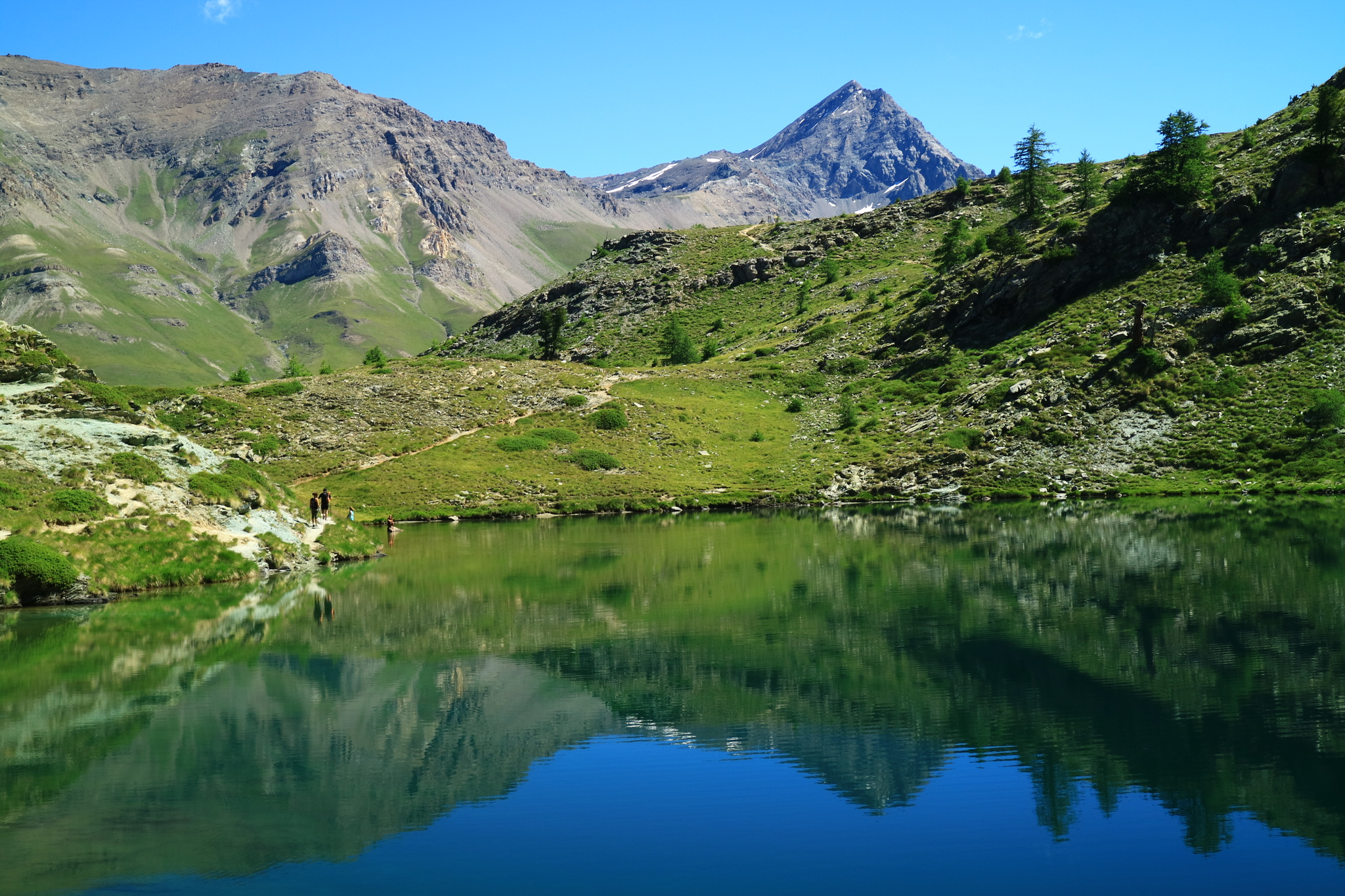
The Loye Lake in the upper Cogne Valley

== Geography ==
The valley is part of the hydrographic basin of the Dora Baltea, and has a U-Shape. Just before Cogne, four minor valleys gather to form the Cogne valley: the Valnontey, leading to the Gran Paradiso, the Grauson Valley, leading to the Grauson peak, and, eastwards, the Urtier Valley and the Valeille. All the streams from these valleys flow into the Grand Eyvia, which flows into the Dora Baltea near Aymavilles.
