= Champorcher =

Champorcher Tsamportsé (Arpitan)
- Comune
- Comune di Champorcher; Commune de Champorcher
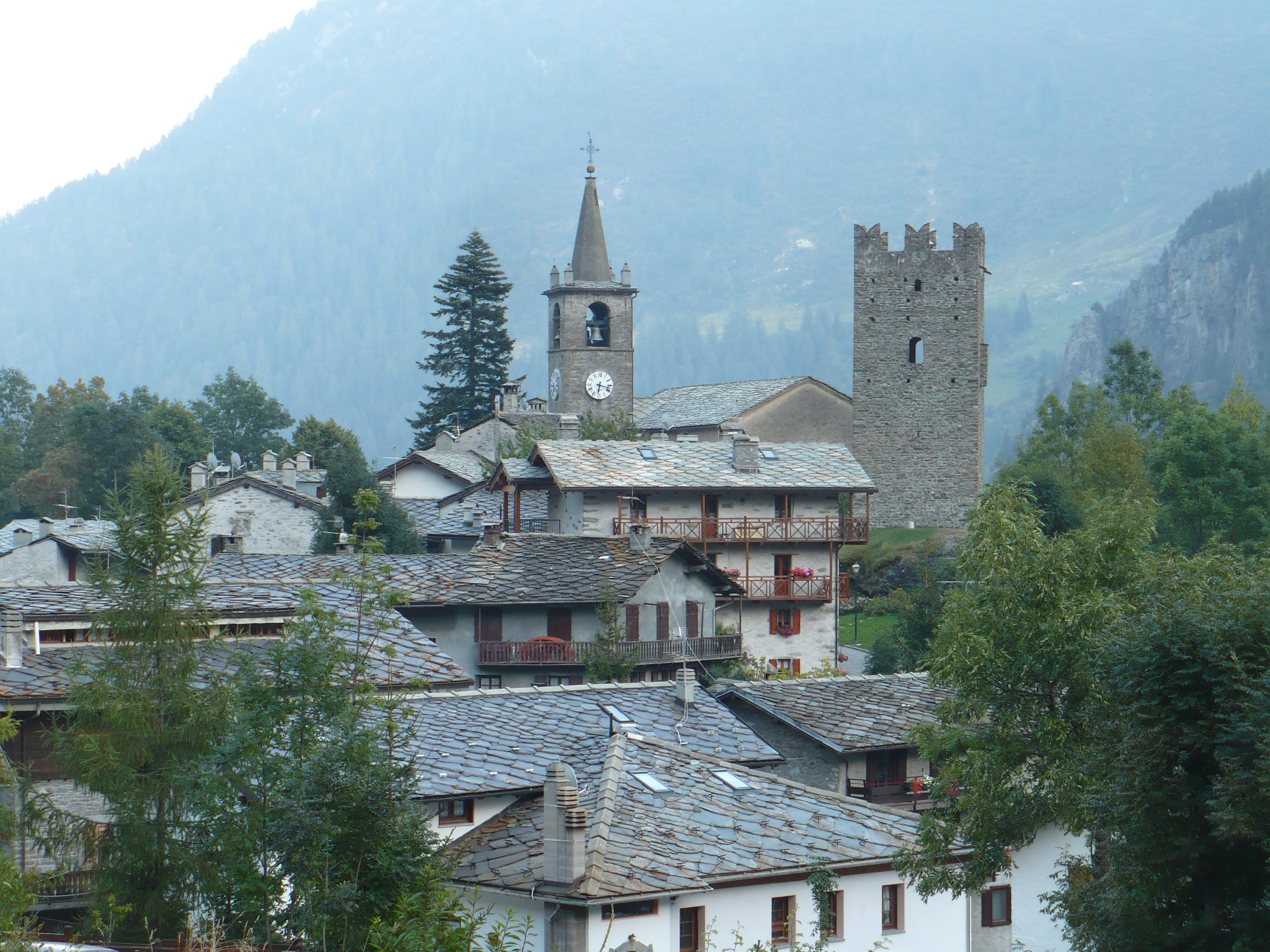

- Coat of arms

- Location within Italy Location within Aosta Valley
- Coordinates: 45°37′N 7°37′E
- Country: Italy
- Region: Aosta Valley
- Frazioni: Arbussey, Boussiney, Byron, Chardonney, Château, Collin, Coudreyt, Dogier, Dublanc, Échelly, Garavet, Gontier, Grand-Mont-Blanc, Grand-Rosier, L'Écreux, Loré, Mellier, Moulin, Outre-l'Ève, Parié, Perrier, Perruchon, Petit-Mont-Blanc, Petit-Rosier, Ronchas, Salleret, Sen-du-Gail, Vagly, Verannaz, Vignat, Vigneroise

Government
  - Mayor: Alice Chanoux

Area
  - Total: 68 km^{2} (26 sq mi)
- Elevation: 1,427 m (4,682 ft)

Population (31 December 2022)
  - Total: 362
  - Density: 5.3/km^{2} (14/sq mi)
- Demonym: Champorcherains
- Time zone: UTC+1 (CET)
  - Summer (DST): UTC+2 (CEST)
- Postal code: 11020
- Dialing code: 0125
- Patron saint: Saint Nicholas
- Saint day: 6 December

Champorcher (French: [ʃɑ̃pɔʁʃe]; Arpitan: Tsamportsé, lit. 'field of Porcius') is a comune in the Aosta Valley region of northwestern Italy, the main town in the Champorcher Valley.

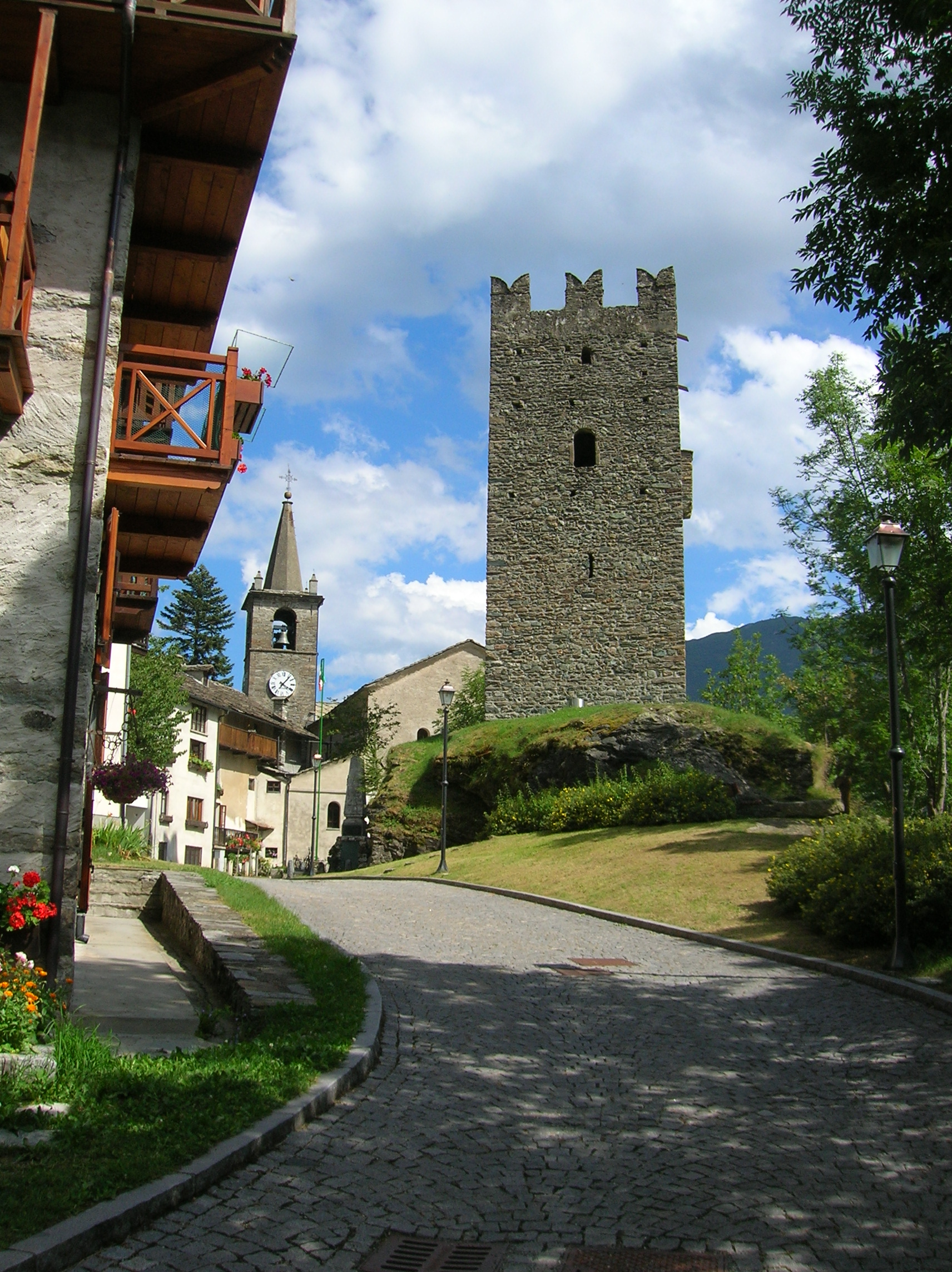
The Champorcher Castle

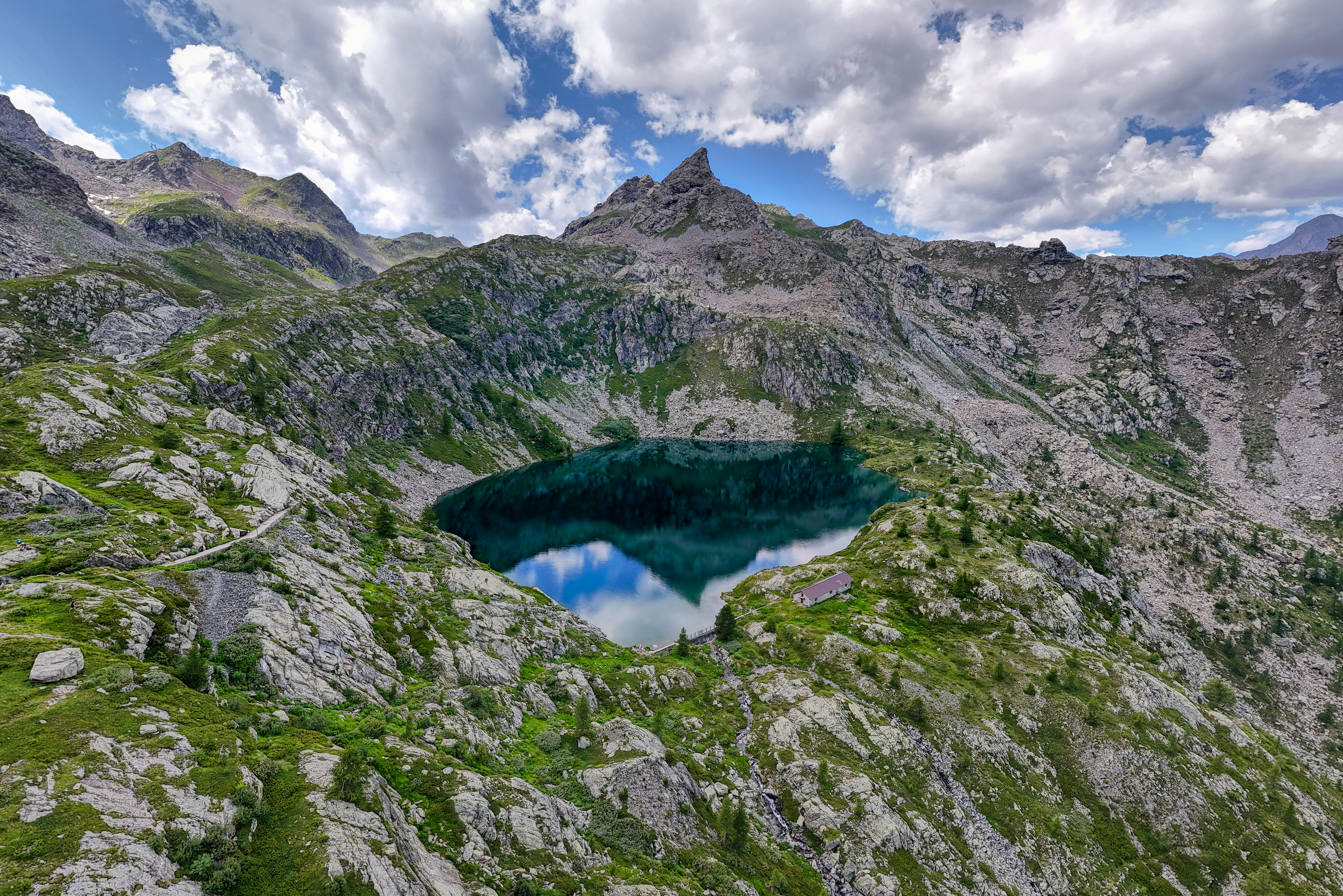
Vercoche lake, near Champorcher

== Notable people ==
- Pierre Chanoux

=== Sport ===
- Nicole Gontier (born 1991), biathlete
