= Mare (disambiguation) =

A mare is a female horse.

Mare is the Latin word for “sea”.

Mare may also refer to:

== People ==
Surname

- Mare (surname)
- Walter de la Mare (1873–1956), English poet and writer

Given name

- Mare Kandre (1962–2005), Swedish writer of Estonian origin
- Mare Mikoff (born 1941), Estonian sculptor
- Mare Tommingas (born 1959), Estonian ballet dancer and choreographer
- Mare Teichmann (born 1954), Estonian psychologist and academic
- Mare Vint (1942–2020), Estonian graphic artist
- Mare Winningham (born 1959), American actress and singer

== Places ==
- Maré, a commune in the Loyalty Islands of New Caledonia
- Maré Island, the second-largest of the Loyalty Islands
- Maire, Netherlands, also known as Mare, former village in Zeeland, Netherlands
- Märe, a mountain in the Bernese Alps in Switzerland
- Maré, Rio de Janeiro, a favela in Rio, Brazil
- Weston-super-Mare, a town in North Somerset, England
- Mare', a town in Syria

=== In Romania ===
- Baia Mare, a municipality in Romania
- Sânnicolau Mare, town in Timiș County, Romania
- Satu Mare County, is a county (judeţ) in Romania
- Vânju Mare, a town in Mehedinţi County, Romania
- Târnava Mare River, a river in Romania
- Someşul Mare River, a river in Romania

=== Geography ===
- Mare Nostrum, another name for the Mediterranean Sea
- Kraken Mare, a large body of liquid on Saturn's moon Titan
- Lunar mare, a basaltic plain on Earth's moon

== Music ==
- Mare (band), an experimental band on Hydra Head Records
- "Mare" (Diamá Song), 2014
- "Mare", a song by Black Eyed Peas from the album The E.N.D.

== Other uses ==
- Mare (folklore), a being in Germanic folklore
- Mare's Leg, or Mare's Laig, a pistol first used in the fictional television series Wanted: Dead or Alive
- Mare (TV series), Japanese television drama
- Museum of Recent Art (Romania), MARe - acronym for a contemporary art museum in Romania
- Mare Sheehan (Kate Winslet), fictional main character in HBO crime drama Mare of Easttown
- Mayor Mare (Cathy Weseluck), fictional character in the series My Little Pony: Friendship is Magic
- The Mare, a 2015 novel by American author Mary Gaitskill
- Mare, another name for Thalassa in classical mythology
- Mare Co., Ltd., Owner of the Japanese video game website Denfaminico Gamer

== See also ==
- Mares (disambiguation)
- Mare Island (disambiguation)
- Satu Mare (disambiguation)
- Valea Mare (disambiguation)
- Mayor, a head of a town, district, city, etc.
