= Mares (disambiguation) =

Mares are adult female horses or other equines.

Mares may also refer to:

- Mares (surname) (including a list of people with the name)
- Marès, a French surname (including a list of people with the name)
- Mareš, a Czech surname (including a list of people with the name)
- Saint Mari, also known as Mares, a 1st-century Christian saint
- Mares (scuba equipment), manufacturer of scuba equipment
- Mares (tribe), an ancient Colchian tribe
- Muscle Atrophy Research and Exercise System (MARES), a facility on the International Space Station
- Mares Peak, Italian mountain

== See also ==
- Mare (disambiguation)
- Maris (disambiguation)
