= Maris =

Maris may refer to:

== Personal names ==
- Māris (name), a Latvian masculine given name, including a list of people with the name
- Maris (given name), including a list of people and mythical or fictional characters
- Maris (surname), including a list of people and fictional characters
- Maris the Great, a promotional performance artist based in Denver, Colorado
- MARIS, an American singer-songwriter.

== Places ==
- al-Maris in medieval Nubia
- El Maris, Egypt
- Maris Nunatak, a small coastal nunatak in Antarctica
- Via Maris, a trade route dating from the early Bronze Age, linking Egypt with Iran, Iraq, Turkey and Syria
- Maris, the Latin name of the Mureș River, as mentioned by Herodotus in 484 BC

== Mythology ==
- Maris (mythology), an Etruscan god of agriculture

== Other uses ==
- the Mari people
- MARIS Maritime Archeological Research Institute at Södertörn University, Sweden
- the planet Mars

== See also ==
- Mares (disambiguation)
- Maris Otter, a variety of barley
- Maris Piper, Maris Peer and Maris Bard - varieties of potato
- Maris Wigeon, a variety of wheat
- Marris, a surname
