= Pratiglione =

- Comune
- Comune di Pratiglione
- Location within Italy Location within Piedmont
- Coordinates: 45°21′N 7°36′E
- Country: Italy
- Region: Piedmont
- Metropolitan city: Turin (TO)

Government
  - Mayor: Alessandro Giacomo Gaudio

Area
  - Total: 8.0 km^{2} (3.1 sq mi)
- Elevation: 611 m (2,005 ft)

Population (31 December 2010)
  - Total: 564
  - Density: 70/km^{2} (180/sq mi)
- Demonym: Pratiglionesi
- Time zone: UTC+1 (CET)
  - Summer (DST): UTC+2 (CEST)
- Postal code: 10080
- Dialing code: 0124

Pratiglione is a comune (municipality) in the Metropolitan City of Turin in the Italian region Piedmont. It is located about 45 kilometres (28 mi) north of Turin, in the Canavese geographical area.

Pratiglione borders the following municipalities: Sparone, Canischio, Canischio, Valperga, Prascorsano, Corio, Forno Canavese, and Rivara.
