= Prascorsano =

Prascorsano Prascorsan
- Comune
- Comune di Prascorsano
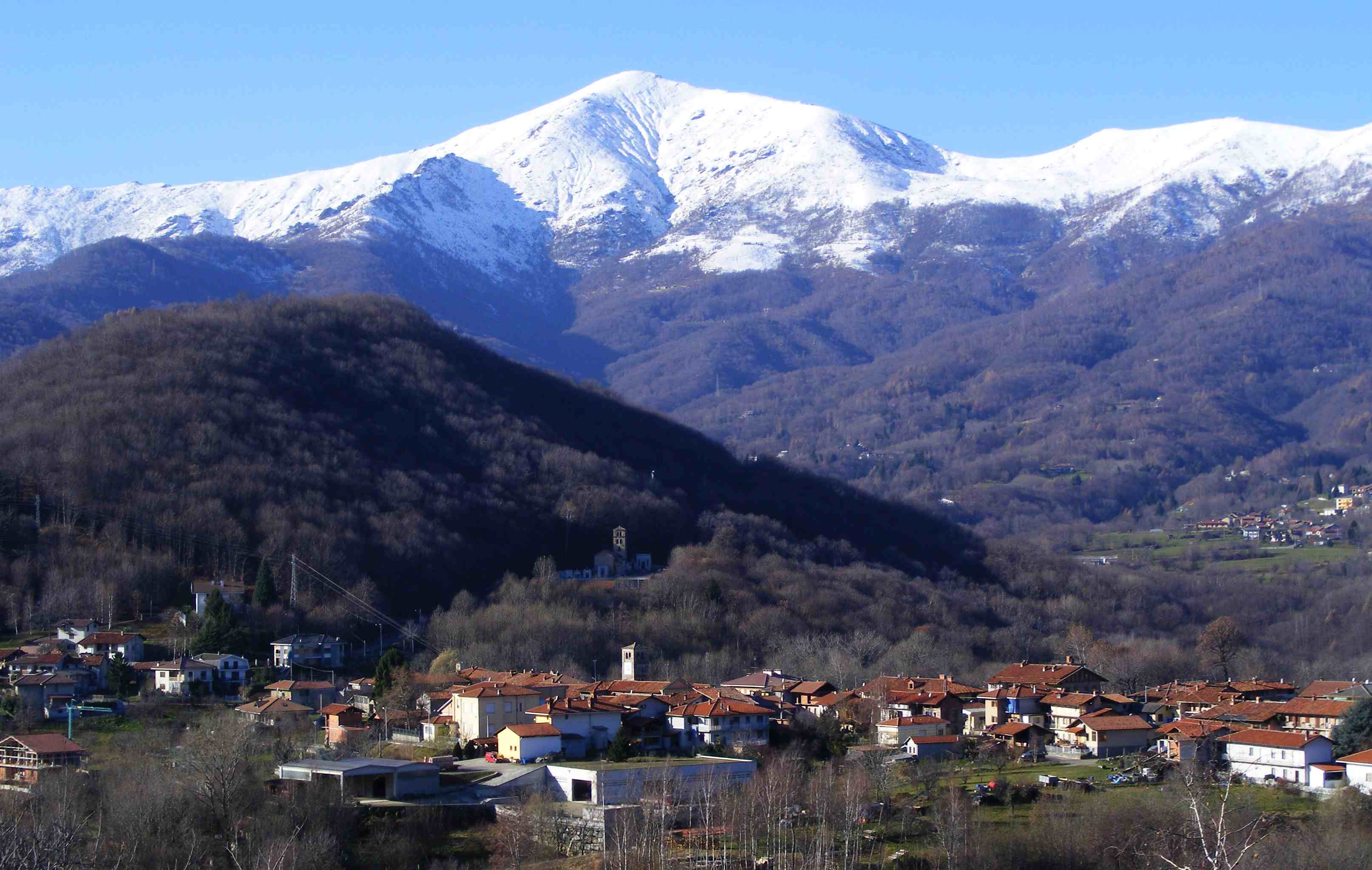

- Location within Italy Location within Piedmont
- Coordinates: 45°22′N 7°37′E
- Country: Italy
- Region: Piedmont
- Metropolitan city: Turin (TO)
- Frazioni: Cerialdo, Galassola, Pemonte, Prabasone, Tetti, Comunie

Government
  - Mayor: Piero Rolando Perino

Area
  - Total: 6.3 km^{2} (2.4 sq mi)
- Elevation: 590 m (1,940 ft)

Population (31 December 2010)
  - Total: 798
  - Density: 130/km^{2} (330/sq mi)
- Demonym: Prascorsanesi
- Time zone: UTC+1 (CET)
  - Summer (DST): UTC+2 (CEST)
- Postal code: 10080
- Dialing code: 0124
- Website: Official website

Prascorsano is a comune (municipality) in the Metropolitan City of Turin in the Italian region Piedmont, located about 35 kilometres (22 mi) north of Turin.

Prascorsano borders the following municipalities: Cuorgnè, San Colombano Belmonte, Canischio, Pratiglione, Valperga, Pertusio, and Rivara. Nearby sights include the Sacro Monte di Belmonte.
