= Mares Peak =

Italian mountain

Cima Mares
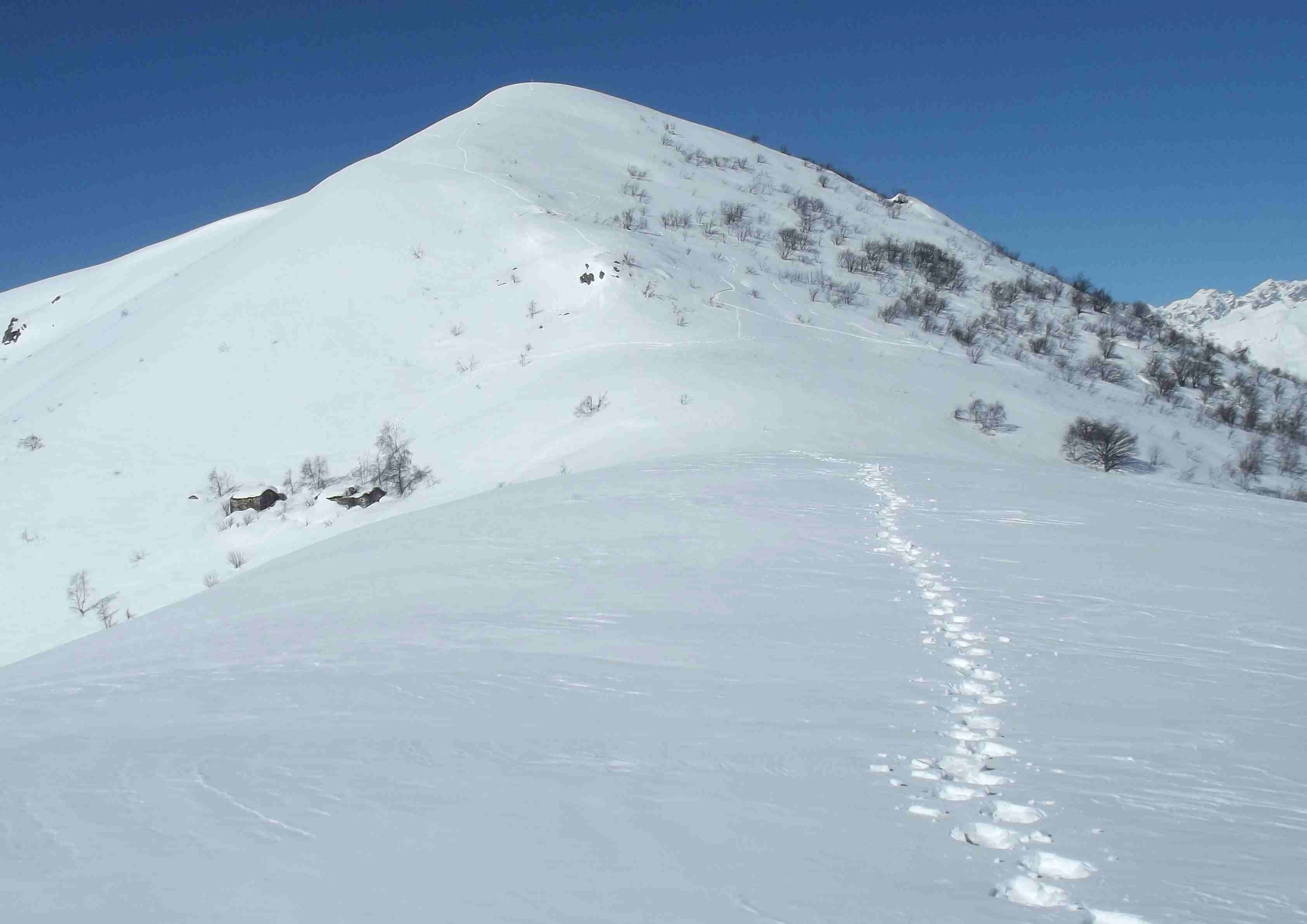
- Cima Mares from La Bassa

Highest point
- Elevation: 1,653.5 m (5,425 ft)
- Prominence: 108 m (354 ft)
- Isolation: 3.67 km (2.28 mi)
- Coordinates: 45.23°N 7.33°E

Geography
- Location: Province of Turin, Piedmont, Italy
- Region: Piedmont
- Province: Province of Turin
- Parent range: Graian Alps, Alps

Mares Peak (1,653.5 m MSL) is a mountain belonging to the Graian Alps (and, more specifically, to the Lanzo and High Moorish Alps). It is located in the province of Turin between the municipalities of Sparone, Alpette, and Canischio, whose territories converge on its summit.

== Description ==
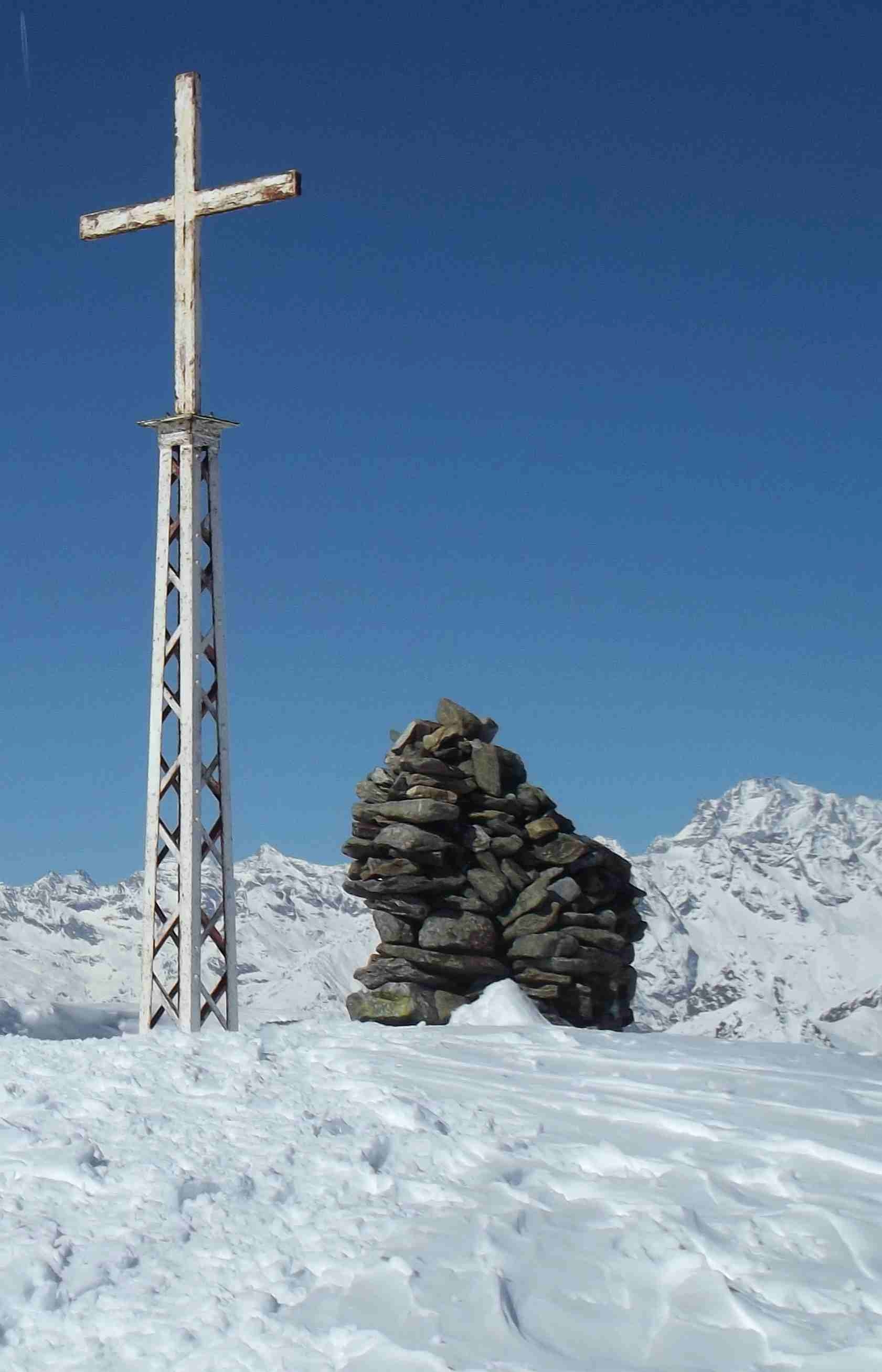
The summit with the Gran Paradiso in the background.

Cima Mares lies on the watershed separating the Orco Valley to the south from the Gallenca Valley. The ridge connecting it southwest to Monte Soglio dips to its lowest point at a saddle (1,546 m or 5,072 ft) near the San Bernardo di Mares chapel. In the opposite direction, the watershed descends to the La Bassa saddle (1,487 m or 4,879 ft), then ascends to the Rocche di San Martino elevations before terminating in the Po Valley near Cuorgnè.

The grassy summit dome features a metal summit cross and a large stone cairn. It also hosts a geodetic trigonometric point established by the Istituto Geografico Militare (IGM), coded as "Cima Mares" (042117). Due to its prominent position, Cima Mares is highly visible from the Canavese region below and offers panoramic views of the Gran Paradiso massif and the Ivrea morainic amphitheater.

== History ==
On December 8, 1943, a significant battle occurred between partisans and Nazi-fascist forces in the area encompassing Forno Canavese, Monte Soglio, and Cima Mares. The conflict resulted in 25 partisan deaths, with seven killed in combat and 18 executed by firing squad at the Casa del Fascio in Forno on December 9.

Historically, Cima Mares lay on the boundary between two now-defunct mountain communities: the Valli Orco e Soana and Alto Canavese.

== Access to the summit ==
=== Summer access ===
Cima Mares is a popular hiking destination due to its accessible trails and scenic views. Key routes include paths from Madonna della Neve or Sombeila in Canischio the Nero or Balmassa hamlets in Alpette, and Ronchi San Bernardo in Cuorgnè. These trails are generally rated as E (moderate) on the hiking difficulty scale. From the summit, hikers can continue along the Orco/Gallenca watershed ridge to reach Monte Soglio.

Mountain biking to the summit from the Gallenca Valley is considered extremely challenging up to the San Bernardo chapel, with the final ascent requiring cyclists to push their bikes.

=== Winter access ===
In winter, Cima Mares is a classic ski mountaineering destination, rated as MS (moderate skier) on the ski mountaineering difficulty scale. During snowy seasons, the ascent is also feasible with snowshoes.

== See also ==
- Graian Alps
- Canavese
- Italian resistance movement
