= Satu =

Satu may refer to:

== Geography ==
- Satu Mare, a town in northwest Romania
- SATU, a people mover in Portugal

== Other ==
- Satu (name), a popular female given name in Finland
  - Satu (Edward Vesala album), album by Finnish musician Edward Vesala 1976
- The number one (1) in the Indonesian and Malay languages
  - Satu (Iwan Fals album), 2015 album by Indonesian singer-songwriter Iwan Fals featuring bands Noah, Nidji, Geisha and d'Masiv
  - Satu (Siti Nurhaliza concert), concert by Siti Nurhaliza

== See also ==
- Satu Mare (disambiguation)
