= The Mare =

2015 novel by Mary Gaitskill

- Author: Mary Gaitskill
- Language: English
- Genre: Bildungsromans
- Publisher: Pantheon
- Publication date: November 3, 2015
- Publication place: United States
- Pages: 441 pages
- ISBN: 9780307379740
- OCLC: 903284253

The Mare is a 2015 novel by American author Mary Gaitskill. The story focuses on a young Dominican girl, Velvet Vargas, who moves to upstate New York to live with a white couple for a few weeks and her encounters with a horse, Fugly Girl, at a neighboring stable. The novel was partially inspired by Gaitskill's own experience hosting a child with the charity Fresh Air Fund and Enid Bagnold's 1935 novel National Velvet. The novel received primarily positive reviews.

== Plot ==
Ginger is a forty-year-old former artist and recovering alcoholic who met her husband, Paul, at an Alcoholics Anonymous meeting. The childless couple decides to host an eleven-year-old Dominican girl from Crown Heights, Brooklyn, Velveteen "Velvet" Vargas. Velvet moves to Rhinebeck, New York, to live with the family as part of a temporary fostering program. While staying with the couple, she befriends a former racehorse Fugly Girl, whom she renames Fiery Girl, at the neighboring stable and Ginger pays for Velvet to take riding lessons.

== Background and publication ==
Gaitskill wrote in a 2009 essay titled "Lost Cat" about her experience with the charity Fresh Air Fund, whereby Caesar, a six-year-old boy from the Dominican Republic, came to live with her and her then-husband Peter Trachtenberg in upstate New York. The essay, published in Granta, discusses her experience with Caesar, his sister Natalia, and her emotions about the disappearance of her cat and the death of her father. This encounter inspired The Mare, which was originally published as a 2013 short story in Vice. The Mare is Gaitskill's third novel and her first since she published Veronica in 2005, which was a finalist for the National Book Award. The title is a nod to the French word mère or mother.

The Mare was published by Pantheon on November 3, 2015, and by Serpent's Tail in the United Kingdom. The novel's epigraph comes Enid Bagnold's 1935 novel National Velvet, where a young girl dresses up as a boy in order to successfully compete in the Grand National, which inspired the name of Velvet.

== Reception ==
The novel received generally positive reviews, with comments from some reviewers about the divergence from some of the usual topics present in Gaitskill's fiction. In a review by The New Yorker, Alexandra Schwartz describes Gaitskill as a writer "actively engaged in deep, witchy communion with the perverse", but the novel is ultimately optimistic. It is written in first person, alternating between the voices of Velvet and Ginger, with Paul and Mrs. Vargas narrating short chapters. The writing style is compared to that of Anne Tyler and the use of internal monologue has been contrasted to William Faulkner's As I Lay Dying. Amy Gentry in the Chicago Tribune describes Gaitskill's writing style as "both primal and electric, something like a latter-day D. H. Lawrence". She is noted for her empathy by The Washington Post, although a review in Publishers Weekly emphasizes that there is a tendency towards stereotype.

Elliott Holt in Slate notes that there is a focus on Velvet and Ginger being ostracized by their peers but that Ginger is able to connect with her husband's ex-wife and her step-daughter once Velvet is in her life. However they also downplay her relationship with Velvet, describing it as "an easy way to play at being a parent", and Paul refers to Ginger as a white savior. A review in the Huffington Post notes that Ginger views Velvet as replacing her mother and sister, who have recently died. The relationships between women – Ginger and Paul's ex-wife, Velvet and her classmates, Ginger and Velvet's mother – drive the novel. Joanna Walsh in the Los Angeles Review of Books focuses on the use of words and names in the novel and the parallels drawn between women and horses. The characters often are not able to communicate with each other through words but the novel is noted in The New York Times for its hopefulness. There are references throughout the novel to other children's books, including The Velveteen Rabbit, The Lion, the Witch and the Wardrobe and The Princess Diaries.

The novel was longlisted for the 2017 Women's Prize for Fiction.
