= Diamá discography =

- Studio albums: 1
- Extended plays: 1
- Singles: 3

Diamá's (a.k.a. Claudia D'Addio) discography starts 2006 with an unofficial Single "You can't stop me/Identità", recorded when she was part of the Eurovision Song Contest 2006 entry for Switzerland Six4One. Both songs were never part of an album but became part of the Six4One album. The single was physically released in Switzerland only through Phonag. Digitally it was released worldwide by Chips Records (Germany). At the time she was signed with Jupiter Records, record label of notorious German composer and producer Ralph Siegel. Due to different views about her career both sides did not dispose picking up the option for an album. Everything was resolved in collegial manners.

After this experience she and her songwriter and longtime friend Jiameé started working on new material, but Diamá felt not ready to start an own career and wanted to discover what kind of artist she is on her own. 2007 she collaborated on many projects with DJs and worked on improving her vocal skills. 2008 she started discovering the music set in her Italian roots. Infatuated by Mediterranean sounds and instruments, today's heavy hip-hop beats or electronic elements and inspired by Italian divas such as Sophia Loren, Anna Magnani, Gina Lollobrigida or Giulietta Masina she started understanding what moves her as an artist. Her Italian hometown Caserta and her favorite city Naples both located in the Campania region of Italy furnished most of the inspiration for her debut album set to be released in 2014. Powerful images of strong Italian women inspired the look of her first album. Two young and talented photographers based in Switzerland Shpend Salihu and Basil Stücheli translated her vision into art. The album has a sad undertone due to the fact that she lost her childhood friend in a tragic accident in 2009. Her whole album is dedicated first of all to his memory.

== Discography ==
=== Discography as Diamá ===
Year	Song	Album
2014	Would you be mine?	We're not done
2014	Mare	We're not done
2013	La Mossa (The Brush-Off)	We're not done

=== Discography of collaborations as Diamá ===
Year	Song	Artist	Album	As
2009	8PM (8 Pick-up Moves)	Glitzerhaus feat. Diamá & Stella Dinive	TBA	Featured Artist
2010	White or Purple	Pat & Jiam feat. Diamá	DJ Sam - White or Purple (Compilation)	Featured Artist
2010	I feel it all	Glitzerhaus & Franca Morgano	TBA	Co-Writer

=== Discography as Claudia D'Addio ===
Year	Song	Artist	Album	As
2006	U Can't Stop me	Claudia D'Addio	If we all give a little - The Album	Herself
2006	Identità	Claudia D'Addio	If we all give a little - The Album	Herself
2006	If we all give a little	Six4One	If we all give a little - The Album	Part of the group Six4One
2006	We are tomorrow	Six4One	If we all give a little - The Album	Part of the group Six4One
2006	Never give up your dreams	Six4One	If we all give a little - The Album	Part of the group Six4One
2006	Friends Are Friends	Six4One	If we all give a little - The Album	Part of the group Six4One
2006	U can't stop me / Identità	Claudia D'Addio	U can't stop me / Identità (Unofficial Single)	Herself
2006	Girls Gone Wild	DJ Scaloni	Girls Gone Wild (Compilation)	Featured Artist
2006	Saltwater (Chicane Cover)	Tatana	A tribute to trance	Vocals by
2007	Runnin'	Sinhead	Runnin' (Single)	Additional Vocals
2007	Fruit Addict	Fruit Addict	Fruit Addict (Single)	Vocals By
2007	Fruit Addict (Tatana remix)	Fruit Addict	Fruit Addict (Single)	Vocals By
2007	U can't keep it on	Mr. Fiction (feat. Jiameé)	Sony Ibiza Session 2007 (Compilation)	Co-Writer & Additional Vocals
2007	Wet	Tanja La Croix	A trip to Bikini Island	Featured Artist
2007	D.N.A (Don't need anything)	Tanja La Croix	A trip to Bikini Island	Featured Artist
2007	Save me (feat. Jiameé)	Tanja La Croix	A trip to Bikini Island	Co-Writer
2007	Catwalk (feat. Sophie Kalt)	Tanja La Croix	A trip to Bikini Island	Co-Writer
2007	Horny as me	Tanja La Croix	A trip to Bikini Island	Additional Vocals
2008	Kick it!	Claudia D'Addio & Antonino Spadaccino	Die Besten Fansongs (Blick & SFV Compilation)	Herself
2008	Pink Riot! Official Christopher Street Day Zurich Hymn 2008	Tanja La Croix feat. Claudia D'Addio & Donna Tella	Destination Summer (Compilation)	Featured Artist
2008	Time	Rovnug	Download Exclusive	Additional Vocals
2009	Come into my life	The Problemkidz	Download Exclusive	Additional Vocals
2010	Gente (Te facc'vede)	Tanja La Croix	Download Exclusive	Main Vocals (Credited as Concetta F.)
