= Lost Cat =

Lost Cat may refer to:

- "Lost Cat" (song), a 1996 song by the Welsh band Catatonia
- Lost Cat (memoir), a 2020 memoir by Mary Gaitskill.
- Lost Cat, a television program that was not picked for series production on the Cartoon Network

== See also ==
- Animal loss
