= Mary Gaitskill =

American writer (born 1954)

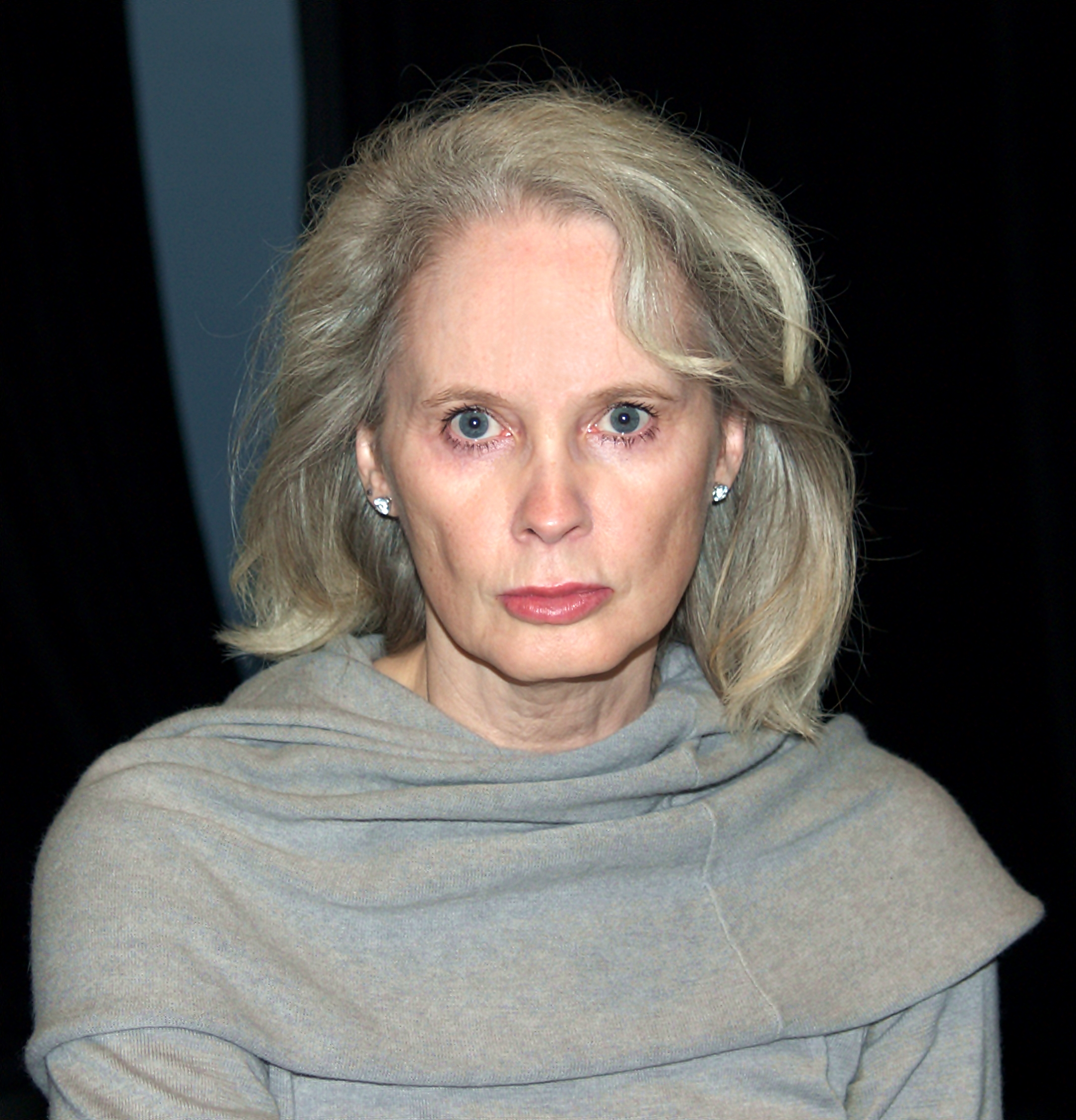
- Gaitskill at the 2010 Brooklyn Book Festival
- Born: November 11, 1954 (age 71); Lexington, Kentucky, U.S.
- Education: University of Michigan (BA)
- Occupation: Writer
- Spouse: Peter Trachtenberg (m. 2001; div. 2010)
- Writing career
- Period: 1980s–present
- Genres: literary short story, novel, essay, Transgressive Fiction

Mary Gaitskill (born November 11, 1954) is an American novelist, essayist, and short story writer. Her work has appeared in The New Yorker, Harper's Magazine, Esquire, The Best American Short Stories (1993, 2006, 2012, 2020), and The O. Henry Prize Stories (1998, 2008). Her books include the short story collection Bad Behavior (1988) and Veronica (2005), which was nominated for both the National Book Award for Fiction and the National Book Critics Circle Award for Fiction.

== Life ==
Gaitskill was born in Lexington, Kentucky. She has lived in New York City, Toronto, San Francisco, Marin County and Pennsylvania, and attended the University of Michigan, where she earned her B.A. in 1981 and won a Hopwood Award. She sold flowers in San Francisco as a teenage runaway. In a conversation with novelist and short-story writer Matthew Sharpe for BOMB Magazine, Gaitskill said she chose to become a writer at age 18 because she was "indignant about things—it was the typical teenage sense of 'things are wrong in the world and I must say something.'" Gaitskill has also recounted (in her essay "Revelation") becoming a born-again Christian at age 21 but lapsing after six months.

She married writer Peter Trachtenberg in 2001; they divorced in 2010.

Gaitskill has taught at UC Berkeley, the University of Houston, New York University, The New School, Brown University, Syracuse University, and in the MFA program at Temple University. She has previously been a Writer-In-Residence at Hobart and William Smith Colleges and Baruch College. As of 2020, Gaitskill is a visiting professor of literature at Claremont McKenna College.

== Works ==
Gaitskill attempted to find a publisher for four years before her first book, the short story collection Bad Behavior, was published in 1988. The first four stories are written in the third person point of view primarily from the perspectives of male characters (the second story "A Romantic Weekend," is split between one male and one female character's point of view). The remaining five stories are written from the perspectives of female characters. 'Secretary' is the only story in the book written in the first-person point of view. Several of the stories have themes of sexuality, romance, love, sex work, sadomasochism, drug addiction, being a writer in New York City, and living in New York City. 'A Romantic Weekend' and 'Secretary' both explore themes of BDSM and psychological aspects of dominance and submission in sexual relationships. The story 'Connection' is about the growth and breakdown of a female friendship.

Gaitskill's fiction is typically about female characters dealing with their own inner conflicts, and her subject matter matter-of-factly includes many "taboo" subjects such as prostitution, addiction, and sado-masochism. Gaitskill says that she had worked as a stripper and call girl. She showed similar candor in an essay about being raped, "On Not Being a Victim", for Harper's Magazine.

Gaitskill's 1994 essay in Harper's Magazine also addresses feminist debates about date rape, victimization, and responsibility. She describes ways that individual subjectivity influences all experiences, making it impossible to come to "universally agreed-upon conclusions."

The film Secretary (2002) is based on the short story of the same name in Bad Behavior, although the two have little in common. She characterized the film as "the Pretty Woman version, heavy on the charm (and a little too nice)," but observed that the "bottom line is that if [a film adaptation is] made you get some money and exposure, and people can make up their minds from there."

The novel Two Girls, Fat and Thin follows the childhood and adult lives of Justine Shade (thin) and Dorothy Never (fat). Justine works through her sadomasochistic issues while Dorothy works through her up-and-down commitment to the philosophy of "Definitism" and its founder "Anna Granite" (thinly veiled satires of Objectivism and Ayn Rand). When journalist Justine interviews Dorothy for an exposé of Definitism, an unusual relationship begins between the two women. In an interview, Gaitskill discussed what she was trying to convey about Justine via her sadomasochistic impulses:

It's a kind of inward aggression. It seems like self-contempt, but it's really an inverted contempt for everything. That's what I was trying to describe in her. I would say it had to do with her childhood, not because she was sexually abused, but because the world that she was presented with was so inadequate in terms of giving her a full-spirited sense of herself. That inadequacy can make you implode with a lot of disgust. It can become the gestalt of who you are. So the masochism is like "I'm going to make myself into a debased object because that is what I think of you. This is what I think of your love. I don't want your love. Your love is shit. Your love is nothing.

Gaitskill revisited her short story Secretary in 2023, not as a sequel, but as a retelling. Published in The New Yorker magazine on March 27, 2023, the second version continues with the main character revisiting her employer after several decades. In an interview with Deborah Treisman in The New Yorker, she explained what the main character Debbie feels:

The MeToo movement, though it's not explicitly named, has caused her to look back and think about her experience differently... in a perverse way, what the lawyer did awakened her and made her feel more alive than before or since. But that aliveness came at a heavy price.

The novel The Mare, published in 2015, is written from the perspectives of several different characters. The primary characters are named Ginger and Velvet (short for Velveteen). Ginger is a middle-aged woman who meets Velvet, a young adolescent, through The Fresh Air Fund. Other characters whose perspectives are featured include Paul (Ginger's husband), Silvia (Velvet's mother), Dante (Velvet's younger brother), and Beverly (a horse trainer).

Gaitskill received the Arts and Letters Award in Literature from The American Academy of Arts and Letters in 2018. Gaitskill's other honors include a Guggenheim Fellowship in 2002 and a PEN/Faulkner Award nomination for Because They Wanted To in 1998. Veronica (2005) was a National Book Award nominee, as well as a National Book Critics Circle finalist for that year. The book is centered on the narrator, a former fashion model and her friend Veronica who contracts AIDS. Gaitskill mentioned working on the novel in a 1994 interview, but that same year she put it aside until 2001. Writing of Veronica and Gaitskill's career in Harper's Magazine in March 2006, Wyatt Mason said:

Through four books over eighteen years, Mary Gaitskill has been formulating her fiction around the immutable question of how we manage to live in a seemingly inscrutable world. In the past, she has described, with clarity and vision, the places in life where we sometimes get painfully caught. Until Veronica, however, she had never ventured to show fully how life could also be made a place where, despite all, we find meaningful release.

Gaitskill's favorite writers have changed over time, as she noted in a 2005 interview, but one constant is the author Vladimir Nabokov, whose Lolita "will be on my ten favorites list until the end of my life." Another consistently named influence is Flannery O'Connor. Despite her well-known S/M themes, Gaitskill does not appear to consider the Marquis de Sade himself an influence, or at least not a literary one: "I don't think much of Sade as a writer, although I enjoyed beating off to him as a child."

== Bibliography ==
- Bad Behavior (1988) (stories) ISBN 0-671-65871-9
- Two Girls, Fat and Thin (1991) (novel) ISBN 0-671-68540-6
- Because They Wanted To (1997) (stories) ISBN 0-684-80856-0
- Veronica (2005) (novel, National Book Award Finalist) ISBN 0-375-42145-9
- Don't Cry (2009) (stories) ISBN 0-375-42419-9
- The Mare (2015) (novel) ISBN 978-0307379740
- Somebody with a Little Hammer (2017) (essays) ISBN 0-307-37822-5
- This Is Pleasure (2019) (novella) ISBN 978-1524749132
- Lost Cat (2020, originally published in Granta in 2009) (memoir) ISBN 978-1911547808
- The Devil's Treasure: A Book of Stories and Dreams (2021) ISBN 978-1733540155
- 'Minority Report' (2023) (story, published in New Yorker, March 20, 2023)
- Oppositions (2023) (essays) ISBN 978-1788168168

== Awards ==
- Arts and Letters Award in Literature, The American Academy of Arts and Letters (2018).
- Cullman Research Fellowship at the New York Public Library (2010)
- Guggenheim Fellowship for fiction (2002)
- Hopwood Award
- Royal Society of Literature International Writer (2022)
