= Cuorgnè =

- Comune
- Comune di Cuorgnè
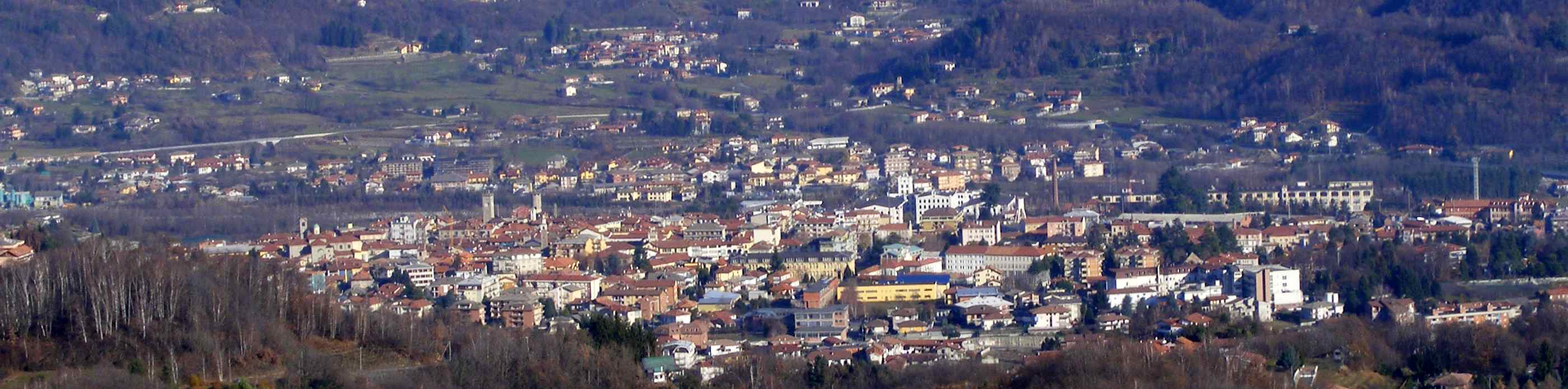
- Panorama from Belmonte sanctuary

- Coat of arms

- Location within Italy Location within Piedmont
- Coordinates: 45°23′N 7°39′E
- Country: Italy
- Region: Piedmont
- Metropolitan city: Turin (TO)
- Frazioni: Priacco, Ronchi Maddalena, Ronchi San Bernardo, Salto, Sant'Anna di Campore

Government
  - Mayor: Giovanna Cresto

Area
  - Total: 19.31 km^{2} (7.46 sq mi)
- Elevation: 414 m (1,358 ft)

Population (31 August 2021)
  - Total: 9,438
  - Density: 488.8/km^{2} (1,266/sq mi)
- Demonym: Cuorgnatesi
- Time zone: UTC+1 (CET)
  - Summer (DST): UTC+2 (CEST)
- Postal code: 10082
- Dialing code: 0124
- Patron saint: Madonna della Rivassola
- Website: Official website

Cuorgnè (Italian pronunciation: [kworˈɲɛ]; Piedmontese: Corgnè [kʊrˈɲɛ] or Coergnè [kwərˈɲɛ]) is a comune (municipality) in the Metropolitan City of Turin in the Italian region Piedmont, located about 35 kilometres (22 mi) north of Turin.

Cuorgnè is located at the mouth of the Orco Valley, and borders the following municipalities: Castellamonte, Pont Canavese, Borgiallo, Chiesanuova, Alpette, San Colombano Belmonte, Canischio, Valperga, and Prascorsano.

Curgné originated in the Middle Ages after the ancient town of Canava was destroyed by a flood of the Orco River (1030). Later it was held by Arduin of Ivrea's descendants, and, later, by the House of Savoy. It received the status of city in 1932. Sights include the Archaeological Museum of Canavese (with findings from the nearby area, in particular from the Neolithic Age) and the Sacro Monte di Belmonte, located in Valperga, a few kilometers outside the town.
