= Valperga Castle =

Italian castle

- Castello di Valperga
- Valperga, Piedmont, Italy
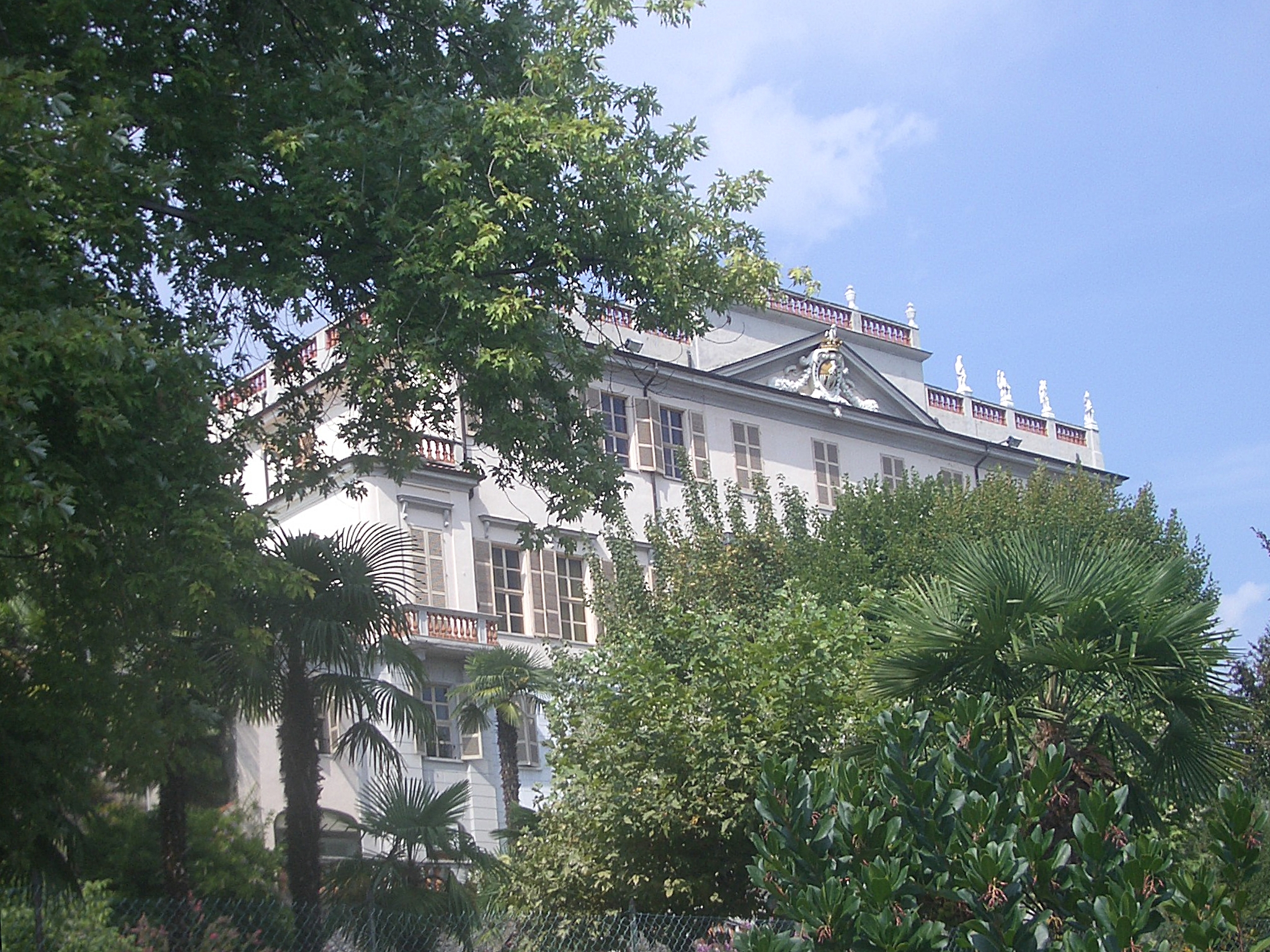
- Valperga Castle in 2009

Site information
- Type: Castle

Location
- Location in Italy
- Coordinates: 45°22′18.51″N 7°39′17.46″E

Valperga Castle (Italian: Castello di Valperga) is a castle located in Valperga, Piedmont, Italy.

== History ==
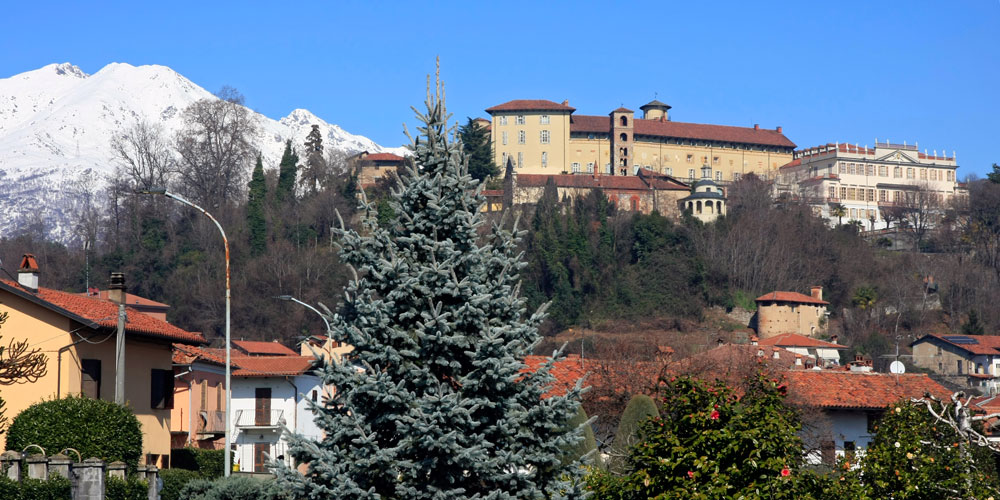
The castle as seen from the surrounding plain

The castle was established as a fortified structure in the late 11th century by the then local lords, the Silvesco and Droengo families. By the early 12th century, it came under the ownership of the De Canavise family, later known as the Counts of Valperga, whose history strongly shaped the development of the castle in the following centuries.

The oldest section of the castle is its northern one, which originally comprised a defensive enclosure equipped with several towers, surrounded by a ditch. The defensive walls were severely damaged during the Canavese wars of the 14th century.

In the 15th century, major reconstructions were undertaken, including the rebuilding of towers and fortifications as well as the addition of residential buildings, shaping the central part of the castle. This period also saw the introduction of late Gothic brick decorations, stylistically akin to those found in the neighbouring Church of San Giorgio.

In the 17th century, the castle started transitioning into a noble residence. The towers and walls were incorporated into a massive residential structure which expanded across the southern slope of the hill, which was completed in the 19th century with a Neoclassical style addition.
