= San Colombano Belmonte =

- Comune
- Comune di San Colombano Belmonte
- Coat of arms

- Location within Italy Location within Piedmont
- Coordinates: 45°23′N 7°37′E
- Country: Italy
- Region: Piedmont
- Metropolitan city: Turin (TO)

Government
  - Mayor: Bruno Biondi

Area
  - Total: 3.4 km^{2} (1.3 sq mi)
- Elevation: 550 m (1,800 ft)

Population (31 December 2010)
  - Total: 375
  - Density: 110/km^{2} (290/sq mi)
- Demonym: Sancolombanesi
- Time zone: UTC+1 (CET)
  - Summer (DST): UTC+2 (CEST)
- Postal code: 10080
- Dialing code: 0124
- Website: Official website

San Colombano Belmonte is a comune (municipality) in the Metropolitan City of Turin in the Italian region Piedmont, located about 35 kilometres (22 mi) north of Turin.

San Colombano Belmonte borders the following municipalities: Cuorgnè, Canischio, and Prascorsano.
