= Canischio =

- Comune
- Comune di Canischio
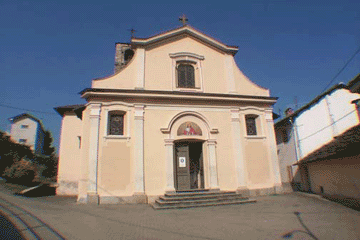

- Location within Italy Location within Piedmont
- Coordinates: 45°22′N 7°36′E
- Country: Italy
- Region: Piedmont
- Metropolitan city: Turin (TO)

Government
  - Mayor: Riccardo Giuseppe Rosa Cardinal

Area
  - Total: 11.95 km^{2} (4.61 sq mi)
- Elevation: 659 m (2,162 ft)

Population (30 November 2017)
  - Total: 272
  - Density: 22.8/km^{2} (59.0/sq mi)
- Demonym: Canischiesi
- Time zone: UTC+1 (CET)
  - Summer (DST): UTC+2 (CEST)
- Postal code: 10080
- Dialing code: 0124
- Website: Official website

Canischio is a comune (municipality) in the Metropolitan City of Turin in the Italian region Piedmont, located about 35 kilometres (22 mi) north of Turin.

Canischio borders the following municipalities: Sparone, Cuorgnè, Alpette, San Colombano Belmonte, Pratiglione, and Prascorsano. It is located in the Gallenca river valley.
