= Marès =

Marès is a French surname. Notable people with the surname include:

- Camille Babut du Marès (fl. 2001), Belgian musician
- Henri Marès (1820–1901), French agronomist

== See also ==
- Mares (surname)
