= Alpette =

Alpette J'Alpëtte (Piedmontese) La Alpete (Arpitan)
- Comune
- Comune di Alpette
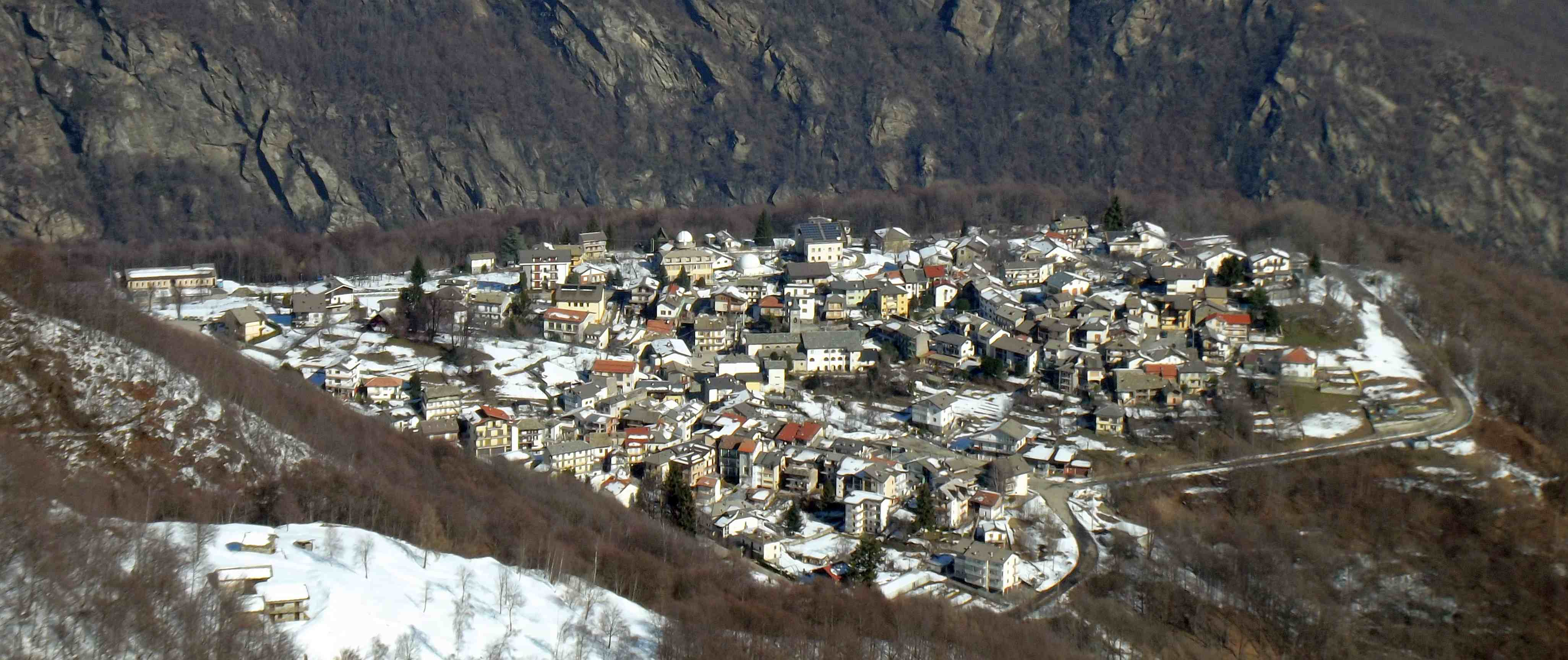

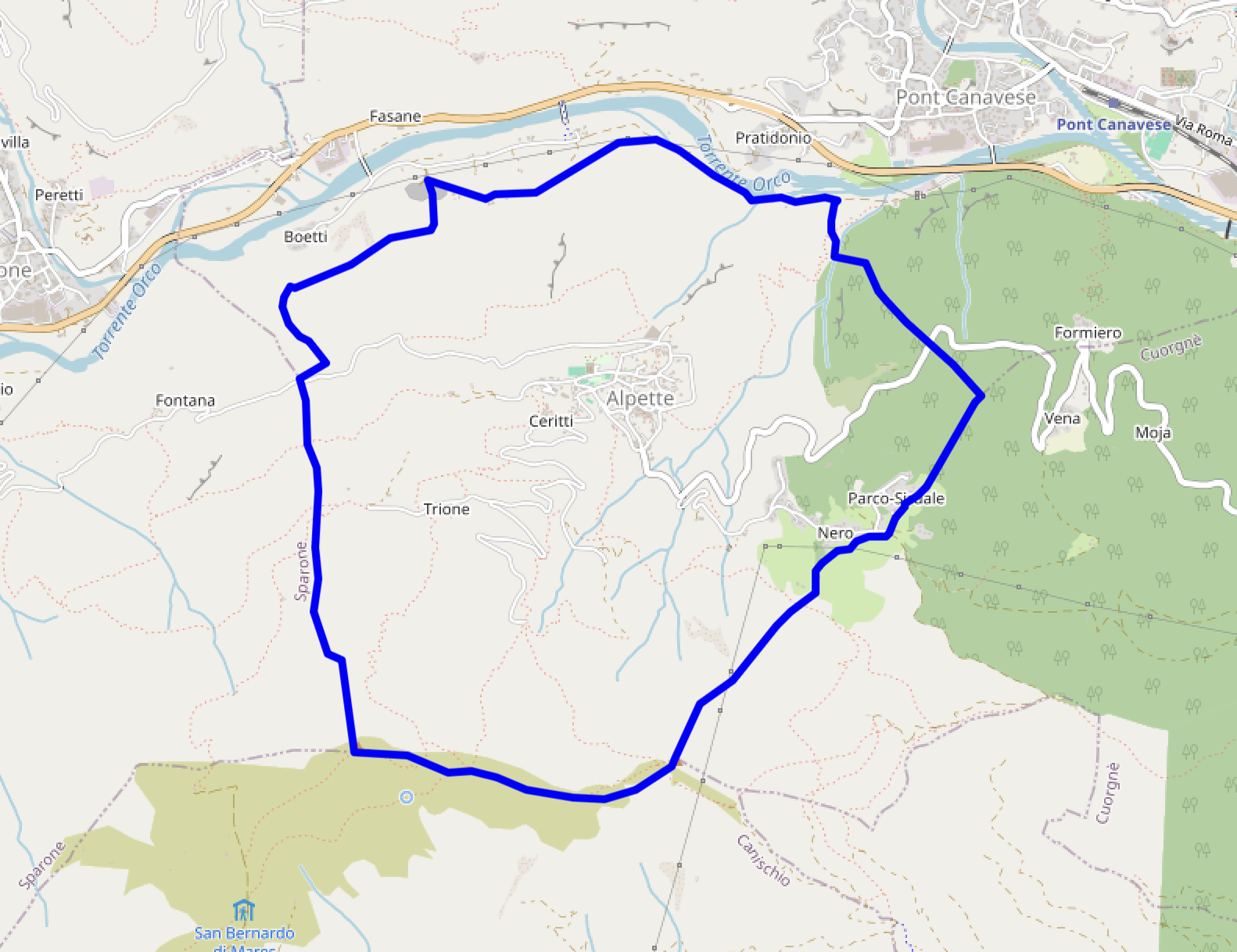

- Location within Italy Location within Piedmont
- Coordinates: 45°25′N 7°35′E
- Country: Italy
- Region: Piedmont
- Metropolitan city: Turin (TO)

Government
  - Mayor: Silvio Varetto

Area
  - Total: 5.63 km^{2} (2.17 sq mi)
- Elevation: 957 m (3,140 ft)

Population (1-1-2017)
  - Total: 255
  - Density: 45.3/km^{2} (117/sq mi)
- Demonym: Alpettese(i)
- Time zone: UTC+1 (CET)
  - Summer (DST): UTC+2 (CEST)
- Postal code: 10080
- Dialing code: 0124
- Website: Official website

Alpette (Piedmontese: J'Alpëtte, Franco-Provençal: La Alpete) is a comune (municipality) in the Metropolitan City of Turin in the Italian region Piedmont, located about 40 kilometres (25 mi) north of Turin.

Alpette borders the following municipalities: Pont Canavese, Sparone, Cuorgnè, and Canischio.
