= Diamá =

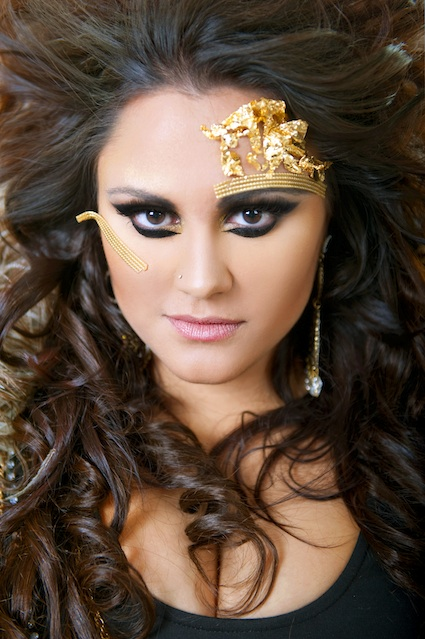

Background information
- Born: Claudia D'Addio; April 8, 1980 (age 46); Schlieren, Zurich, Switzerland
- Origin: Caserta, IT
- Genres: R&B, Urban, Pop, House
- Occupation: Singer
- Years active: 2004–present
- Label: Magnifique Music & Entertainment GmbH

Diamá (aka Claudia D'Addio) (born April 8, 1980) is a Swiss singer. She was born in Schlieren, a suburb of Zürich. Her both parents are Italian immigrants. She grew up in Dietikon, which is close to her place of birth. At the age of seven, she began singing in her hometown church choir "Voci Bianche" (White Voices), which she was part of until her teenage days. At home she would listen to soul and R&B tunes, and while singing along she discovered the strength of her own voice. She found inspiration in soul legends such as Mary J. Blige, Stevie Wonder, Brandy Norwood, and her greatest idol, Italian R&B diva Giorgia. Later, she started to attend karaoke competitions, most of which she was able to win effortlessly.

== Music Star ==
In 2004 her best friend filled out an application form for her, to audition for the second season of Music Star, the Swiss version of American Idol. Claudia attended the first auditions and impressed the jury and got accepted as a contestant. While taking part in the show Claudia deservedly received the nickname "The Voice", an indication as to why she ended up among the top three. After the show, she went on tour with her fellow contestants. Three singles were produced, all of them featured Claudia among the Music Star contestants and all became No.1 records in Switzerland.

When to tour was over, she performed at open-air festivals such as the "Fashion Club Tour 2005". For the Subex gala in Egypt, Claudia was invited to Al-Qusayr and only a few weeks later she was the main act for the Swiss stage at the Olympic Winter Games 2006 in Turin (Italy).

== Eurovision Song Contest 2006 ==
In 2006, renowned German songwriter and composer Ralph Siegel asked her to be part of his2006 Eurovision Song Contest project. She represented Switzerland together with 5 other international artists: Andreas Lundstedt from the Swedish dance formation Alcazar; Marco Matias, an up-and-coming German artist; Tinka Milinović, a Bosnian superstar; Keith Camilleri from Malta; and Liel from Israel. The group was called Six4One, as in six singers for one country. The contest took place in Athens, Greece. After performing first in the final the group slumped to 17th place, receiving only 30 points in total.

Meanwhile, she recorded two songs for the Six4One Album" Six4One – The Album". Both songs "U can't stop me" & "Identità" were released as an unofficial single.

In late November 2006, Claudia was a special guest at the Pirelli Calendar & Film Release Gala in Zurich.

== Activist for the LGBT Community ==
Diamá has always supported the LGBT community and has participated on many important events to support their rights.

=== Christopher Street Day Zurich 2006 & 2008 ===
Right after her Eurovision experience, she performed at the 2006 Christopher Street Day Zurich Festival. She performed her two unofficial songs "U can't stop me" & "Identitá".

In 2008, Zurich's Christopher Street Day Committee asked Claudia's songwriter Jiameé if he was interested in writing something for the event. He started a project and included Claudia, Tanja La Croix and Donna Tella (a well-known Swiss Drag Queen) The project obtained the title "Pink Riot" and became the official Christopher Street Day Zurich Hymn 2008. The Song was performed by all tree artist on the 2008 Christopher Street Day Zurich concert stage as opening act for Ultra Naté, Colton Ford and Ari Gold feat. Kelly King.

=== Mr. Gay Switzerland 2008/2009 ===
November 2008 she was the main act at the 2008/2009 Mr. Gay Switzerland Finale. The event had not been held for four years. Ricco Rimus Müller won the title. He is also the first hearing-impaired Mr. Gay Switzerland.

=== Europride 2009 ===
June 2009, Claudia performed at the Europride 2009 Main-Stage and is, therefore, one of the only Swiss singers to ever perform at a Europride Event. She performed on both nights and announced her new artist name “Diamá”; Friday June 5, 2009 she performed as part of the Glitzerhaus DJ-set, since she is lead singer of their new single "8 PM" (8 Pick-up Moves) together with Swiss DragQueen-Star Stella Divine and Lady Mata Hari (1/3 of the DJ-Combo Glitzerhaus). On Saturday, June 6, 2009 she performed as Main act followed by artists such as LA Superstar "Guy B.", David Guetta’s main voice Chris Willis, singer & DJ-ane Billie Ray Martin and Italian Superstar Tommy Vee. In her set, she performed two songs ("La Mossa" & "Mare") off her yet-untitled debut-album. As a surprise during her set, New York power-voice-diva "Kelly King" entered the stage singing the first notes of Gloria Gaynor's "I will survive" turning into a duet of "Pink Riot!", that was Tanja La Croix’s, Claudia D'Addio’s and Donna Tella’s, official Christopher Street Day Hymn 2008. Other artists who performed at Europride 2009 Mainstage were; Swiss DJ-ane/model Tanja La Croix feat. MC Wreckid, Swiss-ex-porn-star Paula Styles & K-Skill, New York’s 7 octaves wonder "Kelly King", “Deutschland sucht den Superstar” 2004 winner “Elli”, electro-pop pioneers "I like it Electric" & “Swiss DJ-legend “Leon Klein”.

=== Zurich Pride Festival 2010, 2011 & 2012 ===
2010 she again performs for the community at the first Zurich Pride Festival. Two performances set her unique note; one with shooting star Adam Joseph, who recently worked with Bob Sinclar. Adam and Diamá duet the one song that defined House-Music forever; "Robin S. - Show me luv". At the big finale she performed her collaboration track "Glitzerhaus feat. Diamá & Stella Divine - 8 PM (8 Pick-up moves) during the Glitzerhaus grand finale.

Only one year later she presents her first official single "Drivin' Tru" at the 2011 Zurich Pride Festival. In addition she makes a surprise appearance during the performance of house legend Robin S. Together they sang "You know how to love me".

In 2012 she participated in a special musical segment at the Zurich Pride Festival called "Zurich Pride pays tribute to...". The segment was kept a secret until the live performance. Diamá together with Guillermo Sorya & Max Urban two other Swiss new generation artists paid tribute to three of the biggest artists in music history. Max Urban paid tribute to Michael Jackson, Guillermo Sorya paid tribute to Amy Winehouse and Diamá paid tribute to Whitney Houston. At the end of the segment the three singers came together to perform Emeli Sandé's song "Breaking the law" dedicated to the LGBTQIA+ community and the organizations It gets better project and its Swiss sister organization Es wird besser that announced their collaboration at the event.

=== Artist Charity Night 2011 ===
June 2011 she performed at the third Artist Charity Night to raise awareness on HIV.

== Collaborations ==
Claudia then decided to take a break to regenerate, to improve her vocal range and to work on different projects. She recorded "Girls gone wild" for DJ Scaloni. The track was then signed by Universal Switzerland. Then worked with Tatana for her tribute album "A Tribute to Trance", where she recorded the Tribute to Chicane's "Saltwater", originally sung by Máire Brennan. Claudia also lend her vocals for a wellness product. Later the tune was remixed by Tatana herself and became the hymn of a whole club tour.

Tanja La Croix, also known as Tanja Wettach, is a famous Swiss Model/DJ-ane. Together with her songwriter, Claudia co-wrote four songs for Tanja's first artist album, A trip to Bikini Island: Catwalk, Save me (Radio Edit), Wet & DNA (Don't need anything). She is also featuring artist on "Wet" and "DNA".

== Claudia D'Addio becomes Diamá ==
Since, more than once, presenters introduced her as Claudio D'Addio, which is the male form of Claudia and since many others mispronounced her name, she and her management decided to use an artist name for her debut album. Diamá was chosen because it contains the last three letters of her own name Clau(dia) and the first two letter of (Ma)urizio, an homage to her best friend, who died in a tragic accident in September 2009.

== Discography ==
Studio albums

- We're not done (2015)
