= Tanja La Croix =

Swiss DJ

Tanja La Croix is a House DJ and Producer from Switzerland.

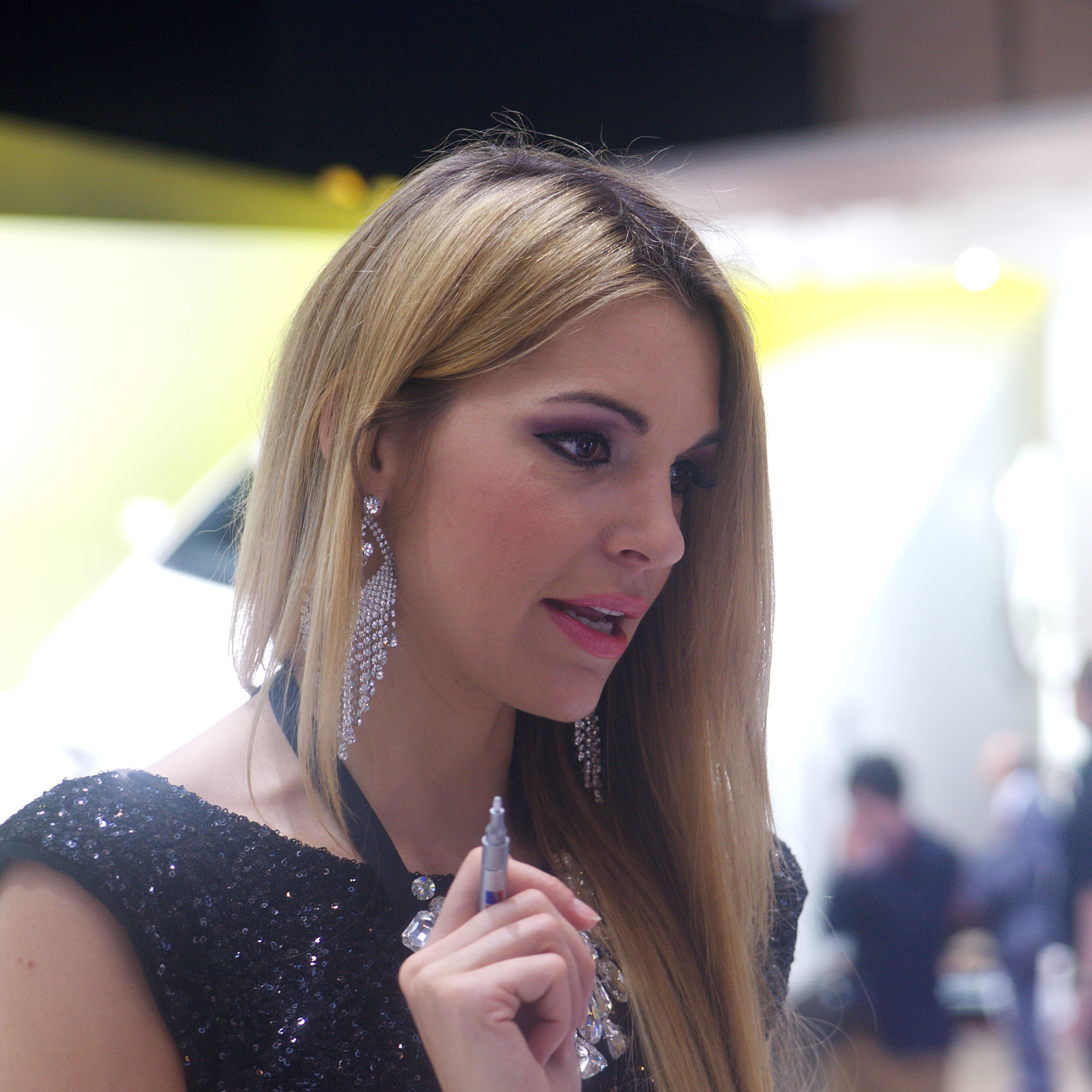
Tanja La Croix during the Geneva Motorshow 2013

== Biography ==
=== Early life ===
Tanja La Croix was born and grew up in St. Gallen, Switzerland. In 1998 Tanja Wettach started her modelling career with her victory at the Miss Bodensee, in 2000 she reached the third place in the Miss Model of the World Contest in Istanbul, and in 2001 she was in the bottom two at the Miss Switzerland election. She continued her international model career and walked on runways for international fashion labels.

=== Music career ===
In 2006 she launched her music career with the release of her Compilation «Lautundspitz» for the online party portal called Lautundspitz. In 2007 DJ Tanja La Croix gave her debut as a producer with her compilation «Trip to Bikini Island», on which she presented for the first time own tracks like «DNA» and «Wet». This compilation reached number 49 of the official Swiss Album Charts. In 2008 she picked up the thread of the success of her former compilation and produced a new one called «Destination Summer», which entered at number 60 on the official Swiss Album Charts
In 2009 she continued her music career with the release of her EP «Gente» under the record label Diamondhouse Records. The track, of the same name as the title «Gente», reached number 1 on the Radio Ibiza Dance Charts in Italy
In March 2010 her new single «In the Club» was released by the record label UNreleased Digital. Only one month later she produced the track «Need More» (including D.O.N.S - Remix) by Diamondhouse Records In the summer of 2010 DJ Tanja La Croix became the musical ambassador of the Street Parade in Zurich; Switzerland's biggest techno festival. As the music ambassador, she was mixing the official Street Parade compilation, which reached number 2 of the Swiss Compilation Charts and she performed on her own Love Mobile.

In 2011 Tanja La Croix first launched her new single «Hard to Handle» feat. Andy P. and the remix by Nicky Romero. In April the same year, she released her fourth compilation «House Kiss», which entered immediately at number 11 on the Swiss Compilation Charts. Beginning of 2011, she became testimonial of the luxury car brand Mercedes Benz Switzerland and produced the soundtrack of the new Mercedes campaign called «Star». At the moment many other brands like Eyezone, G-Shock and Hairstylist Carlo are sponsoring her. This year she received the Swiss Nightlife Award in the category "DJ Publikumspreis".

Her recent most important performances include the collaboration with the Haut-Couture-Channel Fashion TV as well as DJ-Sets at BMC Club (Mallorca), Space (Mykonos), We are Family (Moskau), C-Bar (Dubai), Jimmy’z (Monaco), Club Take Five at the FIS ski race (Kitzbühl), Mercedes-Benz CSI (Zurich), White Club (Beirut), Sottovento Club (Porto Cervo), Nikki Beach (Marbella), Pura Vida (Ibiza) or at the official Red Bull Formula 1 After party in Valencia.

== Discography ==
=== Compilations ===
- 2006 - Lautundspitz
- 2007 - A Trip to Bikini Island
- 2008 - Destination Summer
- 2010 - Streetparade mixed by Tanja La Croix Official Compilation
- 2011 - House Kiss

=== EP ===
- 2009 - Gente

=== Singles ===
- 2009 - Gente
- 2009 - In the Club feat. Kate Matlova
- 2010 - Need More single incl. D.O.N.S Remix released by Diamondhouse Records
- 2011 - Strobo Tanja La Croix Upside down - Bootleg
- 2011 - Hard To Handle feat. Andy P EP Original Mix und Nicky Romero
- 2016 - We Turn The World Around
