= Satu (name) =

Satu is a female given name in Finland, meaning fairytale. Its nameday is celebrated on 18 October. As of 2012, more than 26500 people in Finland had this name. The name peaked in popularity in the 1960s and the 1970s.

== Notable people ==
- Satu Hassi, a Finnish politician
- Satu Huotari, a Finnish ice hockey player
- Satu Levelä, a Finnish long-distance runner
- Satu Mäkelä-Nummela, a Finnish sports shooter
- Satu Paavola, a Finnish actress
- Satu Pauri, a Finnish former heptathlete
- Satu Salonen, a Finnish former cross country skier
- Satu Vänskä, a Finnish violinist
