= Lost Cat (memoir) =

2020 memoir

Lost Cat is a 2020 memoir by Mary Gaitskill. The memoir follows Gaitskill's search for her lost cat and contains descriptions on the death of her father and fostering children. Lost Cat was originally published in 2009 as an essay on Granta. It was later published as a memoir by Daunt Books.

== Background ==
Gaitskill adopted Gattino (Italian for kitten) during a writing retreat in Italy. In Fall 2007, Two and a half months after returning from the retreat, the cat disappears. Gaitskill associated the cat with her late father, who liked Italy and spoke Italian. The writing retreat was Gaitskill's first time in Italy. In 2008, Gaitskill wrote a short essay for The Oprah Magazine about the lost cat. In 2009, a much longer essay was published in the summer issue of Granta.

The memoir is more personal and sentimental than previous works by Gaitskill.
