= Veronica (novel) =

2005 novel by author Mary Gaitskill

- Author: Mary Gaitskill
- Language: English
- Genre: Psychological fiction
- Publisher: Pantheon Books
- Publication date: 2005
- Publication place: United States
- Media type: Print (hardcover and paperback)
- Pages: 227
- ISBN: 978-0-375-42145-7

Veronica is a 2005 psychological fiction novel by American author Mary Gaitskill.
