= Peter Trachtenberg =

American writer

- Born: 1953 (age 72–73)
- Education: Sarah Lawrence College; City College of New York (MA)
- Occupation: Writer
- Spouse: Mary Gaitskill (m. 2001; div. 2010)
- Writing career
- Genres: Fiction; non-fiction
- Notable awards: Whiting Award (2007); Ralph Waldo Emerson Award (2009)

Peter Trachtenberg (born 1953) is an American writer of fiction, nonfiction, and memoir.

== Life ==
He graduated from Sarah Lawrence College, and from City College of New York with an MA. He is an associate professor of creative writing in the Department of English at the University of Pittsburgh. and a member of the core faculty of the Bennington Writing Seminars.

His work has appeared in The New Yorker, Harper's, BOMB, TriQuarterly, O, The New York Times Travel Magazine, and A Public Space.

In 2001, he married writer Mary Gaitskill. They divorced in 2010.

== Awards ==
- 2010 Guggenheim Fellowship
- 2009 Ralph Waldo Emerson Award
- 2007 Whiting Award
- 1984 Nelson Algren Award

== Works ==
=== Books ===
- Torches: A Novel. City College of New York. 1979.
- The Casanova Complex: Compulsive Lovers and Their Women. Poseiden Press. 1988. ISBN 978-0-671-62048-6.
- 7 Tattoos: A Memoir in the Flesh. Crown. 1997. ISBN 978-0-517-70172-0.
- The Book of Calamities: Five Questions About Suffering and its Meaning. Little, Brown. 2008. ISBN 978-0-316-15879-4.
- Another Insane Devotion: On the Love of Cats and Persons. Da Capo Press. 2012. ISBN 978-0-73821-526-6.

=== Anthologies ===
- Laurie Stone, ed. (1998). "I Kiss Her Goodbye". Close to the Bone: Memoirs of Hurt, Rage, and Desire. Grove Press. p. 118. ISBN 978-0-8021-3582-7. "Peter Trachtenberg."

=== Stories and articles ===
- "You're Fired: Cloudburst", The New Yorker, April 21, 2003.
- "The Chattering Masses", The New Yorker, May 15, 2005.
- "Why Obama?", Largehearted Boy, October 2, 2008
- "Dan P. Lee and Travis the killer chimp", Nieman Storyboard, December 4, 2012
- "Tomorrow and Tomorrow", Kenyon Review Online, Summer 2013
- "Madame Bovary: Before Country Was Cool", Modern Farmer, October 9, 2014
- "Inside the Tiger Factory", Virginia Quarterly Review, Summer 2015
