= Mare (Diamá song) =

Single by Diamá

from the album We're not done
- Released: February 14, 2014
- Recorded: 2012
- Genre: Pop; Italian Ballad
- Length: 3:36
- Label: Magnifique Music & Entertainment
- Songwriters: Jiameé, Diamá
- Producer: Pele Loriano,

Diamá singles chronology
"La Mossa (The Brush-Off)" (2014)	"Mare" (2014)	"Would you be mine?" (2014)

Mare is an Italian pop ballad by Italian/Swiss singer-songwriter Diamá, it was released Valentine's Day 2014 (February 14, 2014) as her second single from her upcoming debut album We're not done exclusively on iTunes 2014 (Mastered for iTunes). The single was released two weeks later in all other digital music stores worldwide.

== Background and composition ==
"Mare" is an Italian Pop ballad produced and composed by Pele Loriano and co-written by Jiameé and Diamá. In the song Diamá tells the lovestory between her husband and her. She dedicated the song to him.

== Release and critical reception ==
"Mare" premiered on February 7, 2014, on ESCRadio official Eurovision Song Contest Radio.

== Music video ==
The song's official music video, directed by Serge Wohlgensinger, was shot on August 13, 2012. The music video features Miss Earth Switzerland 2012 Lea Sara Bucher-Wittwer and Swiss soccer player Elias Aguidi. The video premiered on the Swiss Channel SF2 (Swiss Television) during the music-clip show Roboclip and was kept on rotation.

== Release history ==
Country	Store	Date	Format	Label
Worldwide	iTunes	February 14, 2014	Digital download	Magnifique Music & Entertainment
