= Maris (surname) =

Maris is a surname with many origins. In Britain, the name (including De Maris) may be of Old French origin (see Marais (surname)) Both the Greek and Dutch surnames can be matronymics from "Maria". The name can also represent respellings: the American baseball player Roger Maris was born with the Croatian name Maras, while the Dutch painting brothers Jacob, Matthijs and Willem Maris were grandchildren of Wenzel Maresch of Bohemia. People with the surname Maris include:

- Ada Maris (born 1957), Mexican-American actress
- Albert Branson Maris (1893–1989), United States federal judge
- Bart Maris (born 1965), Belgian trumpet player
- Bernard Maris (1946–2015), French economist, writer and journalist
- Bill Maris, American entrepreneur
- Demetris Maris (born 1979), Greek footballer
- Ellen van Maris (born 1958), Dutch bodybuilder
- Erik Maris (born 1964), French racing driver
- George Maris (born 1996), English football midfielder
- Georgios Maris (1882–1949), Greek politician, minister of the interior 1923/1933
- Humphrey Maris (1939–2025), British physicist
- Hyllus Maris (1933–1986), Aboriginal Australian activist, poet and educator
- Jacob Maris (1837–1899), Dutch painter, brother of Willem and Matthijs
- Matthijs Maris (1839–1917), Dutch painter, etcher and lithographer, brother of Willem and Jacob
- Merrill De Maris (1898–1948), American writer who worked on Disney Comic Strips
- Mona Maris (1903–1991), Argentine film actress
- Peter Maris (born 1950s), Greek-born American film director and producer
- Roger Maris (1934–1985), American baseball player
- Simon Maris (1873–1935), Dutch painter and art dealer, son of Willem
- Willem Maris (1844–1910), Dutch landscape painter of the Hague School, brother of Matthijs and Jacob

In legend and fiction:

- Hector de Maris, Knight of the Round Table in Arthurian legend
- Nicole Maris, a major character in the 1999 film Drive Me Crazy
