= Mare (surname) =

Mare is a surname. Notable people with the surname include:

- Aline Mare (born 1961), American artist and filmmaker
- André Mare (1885–1932), French painter and designer
- Juan Ignacio Mare (born 1995), Argentine footballer
- Olindo Mare (born 1973), American football placekicker
- Santiago Mare (born 1996), Argentine rugby player

== See also ==
- Maren (name)
