= El Maris =

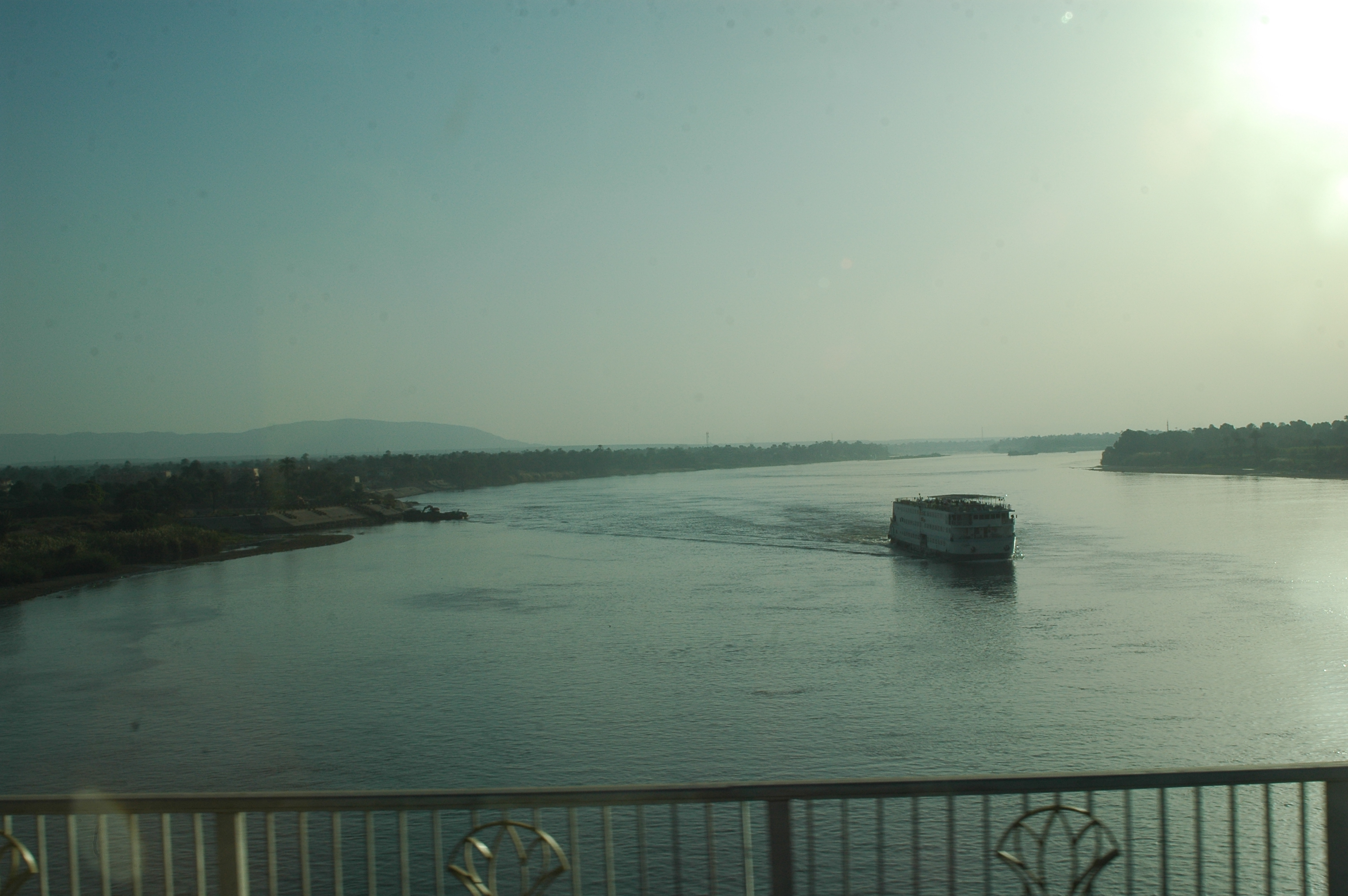
- The Nile at El Maris

- Location in Egypt
- Coordinates: 25°37′N 32°34′E
- Country: Egypt
- Governorate: Luxor Governorate
- Time zone: UTC+2 (EST)
  - Summer (DST): +3

El Maris (Arabic: المريس) is a suburb of al Uqsur, in Egypt. It is part of the Luxor Governorate.
