= Mare Island (disambiguation) =

Mare Island is a peninsula in the city of Vallejo, California.

Mare Island may also refer to:

- Mare Island Naval Shipyard, a former naval base on California's Mare island
- Mare Island (Indonesia), a volcano
- Maré Island, an atoll in the Loyalty Islands
