= Mares (surname) =

Mares is a surname. Notable people with the surname include:

- Abner Mares (born 1985), Mexican boxer
- Harry Mares (1938–2018), American educator and politician
- Osmar Mares (born 1987), Mexican footballer
- Paul Mares (1900–1949), American musician
- Peter Mares (born 1962), Australian journalist and writer
