= Satu Mare (disambiguation) =

Satu Mare is a city in northwest Romania.

Satu Mare may also refer to:

- Satu Mare, Harghita, a commune in Harghita County, Romania
- Satu Mare, Suceava, a commune in Suceava County, Romania
- Satu Mare, a village in Secusigiu Commune, Arad County, Romania
- Satu Mare, a village in Stângăceaua Commune, Mehedinţi County, Romania
- Satu Mare, a village in Crucea Commune, Suceava County, Romania
- Satul Mare, a Romanian name for Velykosillia village, Lunka Commune, Hertsa Raion, Ukraine

== See also ==
- Satu Mare County, Romania
