= The Fresh Air Fund =

New York charity offering sleep-away camps for children

- Founded: 1877; 149 years ago
- Founder: Reverend Willard Parsons
- Tax ID no.: 13-1656653
- Legal status: 501(c)(3)
- Purpose: Charity
- Location: United States
- CEO: Lisa Gitelson
- Revenue: $15,841,861 (2018)
- Expenses: $18,977,003 (2018)
- Employees: 727 (2018)
- Volunteers: 3,500 (2018)
- Website: www.freshair.org

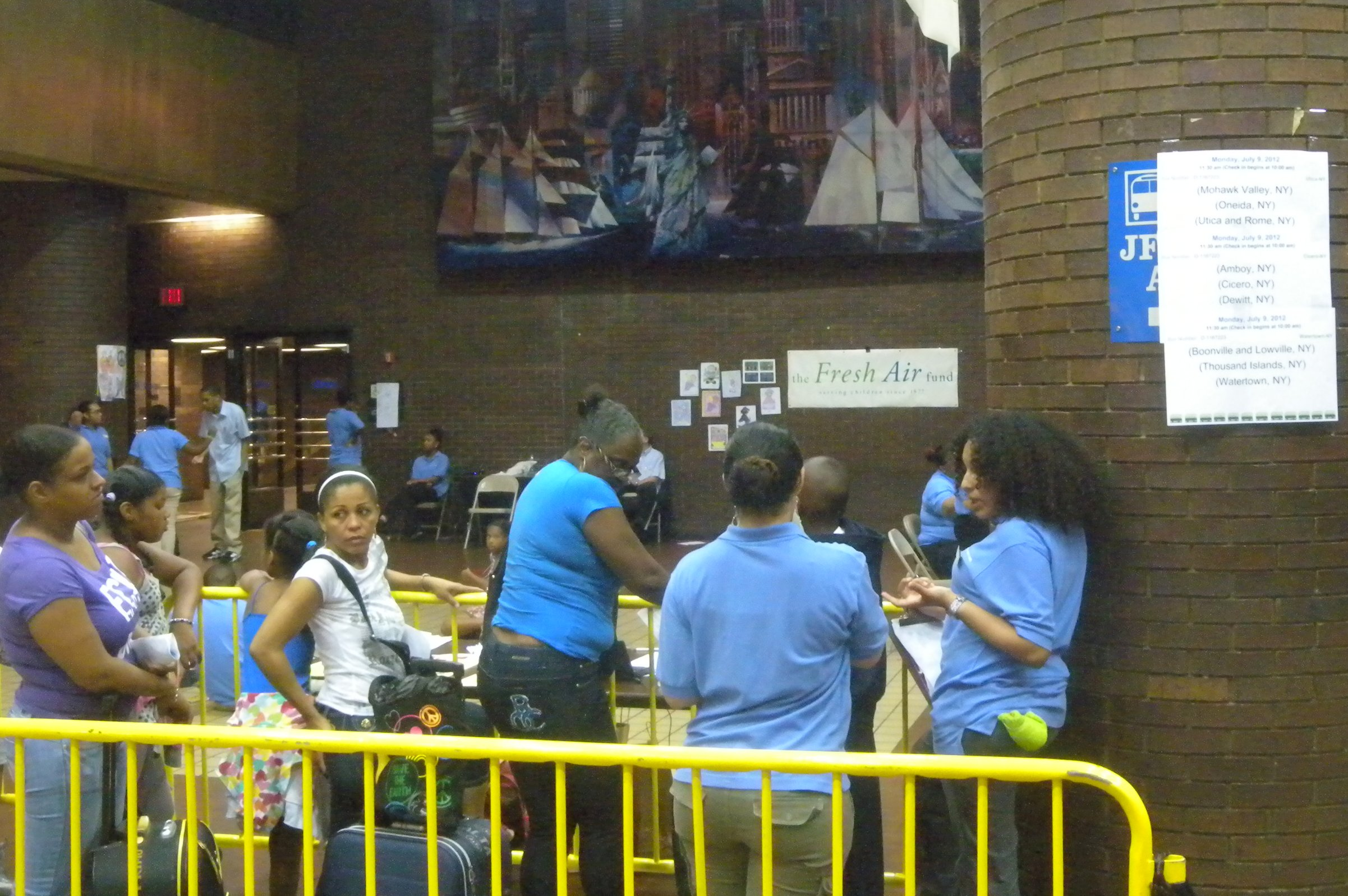
Gathering to board buses

The Fresh Air Fund is a 501(c)(3) not-for-profit agency founded in 1877. The Fund operates six sleep-away camps in New York’s Mid-Hudson Valley, places children with volunteer host families along the East Coast, and runs year-round leadership, career exploration and educational programs. The Fresh Air Fund has served more than 1.8 million children since its founding, with a goal of helping children "have new experiences, learn new skills and gain new perspectives."

== History ==
In 1877, The Fresh Air Fund was created to allow children living in underserved communities the chance to enjoy free summer experiences in the country. Reverend Willard Parsons, a minister who had just moved from New York City to a small, rural parish in Sherman, Pennsylvania, asked members of his congregation to provide country vacations as volunteer host families for New York City’s neediest children. This was the beginning of The Fresh Air Fund. By 1881, the agency's work was expanding so rapidly that Reverend Parsons asked for and secured support from The New York Tribune. By 1888, the agency was incorporated as The Tribune Fresh Air Fund Aid Society. Today, Fresh Air continues to depend on favorable publicity from the media with assistance from The New York Times.

== Volunteer host family program, "Friendly Towns" ==
Fresh Air children ages 8 to 14 years old are given the opportunity to visit with host families to experience the joys of summer in the country. Fresh Air children are registered by more than 90 participating social services and community organizations located in disadvantaged neighborhoods in the five boroughs of New York City. First-time visitors, eight to 14 years old, spend one or two weeks with their host family. Youth who are re-invited by the same family may continue with The Fund through age 18 and may enjoy longer summertime visits year after year.

Friendly Towns host families are volunteers who live in the suburbs or small town communities. Host families range in size and background, and believe the Fresh Air experience is enriching for their own families as well as for the children. There are no financial requirements for hosting a child.

The majority of Fresh Air children are from underserved communities, often without the resources to send their children on summer experiences. Children create lifelong memories of riding bikes, swimming at the beach, visiting local attractions and making new friends.

In every Friendly Town, there is a volunteer committee and Chairperson responsible for the program. The committee publicizes the program, screens applications, checks references, interviews families in their homes and approves new hosts. The committee members also make follow-up visits to all participating host families every three years. The Friendly Town committee assists hosts while Fresh Air children are visiting and often plans group activities during the trips. The Fresh Air Fund provides support to Fund Representatives, Chairpeople and host families 24 hours a day, when Fresh Air children are visiting their towns.

== Summer camping for New York City children ==
The Fresh Air Fund owns and operates five camps located on The Fund’s Sharpe Reservation in Fishkill, New York, 65 miles north of New York City. Sharpe Reservation has 2,300 acres of land with lakes, ponds, streams and hiking trails through the woods. The Fund's sixth camp, Camp Junior, is located in Harriman State Park.

Camp Tommy is The Fund's camp for boys, ages 12 to 15. Camp Tommy offers hiking, nature and other outdoor programs designed to develop cooperation and encourage team building. Major improvements and recently constructed facilities have created opportunities for significant educational programs, such as literacy and career skills development, computer workshops, photography and music. Originally Camp Pioneer from 1948–1998, Camp Tommy's inaugural year was 1999. Camp Tommy is named after Tommy Hilfiger, a supporter of The Fresh Air Fund.

Camp Hayden-Marks Memorial serves boys each session, age nine to 12. Campers take part in outdoor activities including sports, cooperative games, boating, arts and crafts, drama, science and hiking. Boys at Hayden-Marks Memorial also benefit from educational activities, including computers, video, music and art.

At Camp ABC, girls ages 9–15 live in small groups where they learn to develop self-confidence, independence and teamwork skills. Educational programs promote environmental awareness, cultural arts and physical fitness in a fun, safe, supportive environment. Camp ABC has a Leaders-in-Training program for 13 – 15 year olds, which focuses on personal growth, aiming for developing self-confidence and leadership skills.

Camp Hidden Valley serves 130 girls and boys, some with special needs, ages eight to 12. At this camp, children with and without disabilities live and play together. Camp activities include art, hiking, nature and creative writing. The specially designed pool complex is utilized by all campers, including children who use wheelchairs, braces or other forms of assistance.

Camp Mariah, The Fund's Career Awareness Camp, provides the opportunity for adolescents to explore educational paths and career options, while enjoying camp adventures. Camp Mariah offers a unique setting to engage boys and girls in an educational curriculum and prepare them for the world of work. Intensive three-and-a-half-week summer sessions and weekend camping trips are complemented by year-round activities in New York City. Children must be in the sixth grade to apply for the Career Awareness Program. Camp Mariah is named after Board member Mariah Carey.

Camp Junior, in memory of Lesandro “Junior” Guzman-Feliz, a 15 year-old victim of gang violence, is operated by The Fresh Air Fund in partnership with New York State Parks, Recreation and Historic Preservation, Assembly Speaker Carl E. Heastie, Bronx Borough President Vanessa L. Gibson and the Palisades Interstate Park Commission. The camp is for boys and girls, ages 8-15, all from the Bronx.

== Year-round programs and off-season camping ==
The Fund has expanded its initiative recently to intensify its relationship with young campers. Boys and girls from Camps Hayden-Marks Memorial, Hidden Valley and Anita Bliss Coler (ABC) participate in weekend camping programs in the fall, winter and spring. Activities included hiking, cooking, arts and crafts and cooperative games.

The Counselor-In-Training (CIT) program at Camps Anita Bliss Coler (ABC) and Hayden-Marks Memorial has expanded. The majority of CITs are former campers, and all participants must be 16 or 17 years old by the start of the summer. Through this year-round program, which includes summer and weekend camp sessions, participants develop develop leadership, team-building, and communication skills to prepare for future roles as camp counselors.

== Career Awareness Programs ==
The Career Awareness Program focuses on expanding the education and career options of New York City adolescents. Boys and girls, ages 12 to 14, make a commitment for three years in order to participate in specially designed educational, recreational and camping experiences in New York City and at Camp Mariah. All students register in the spring of 6th grade. After completion of the 6th grade school year, they begin the program in the summer.
