= Sacro Monte di Belmonte =

Coordinates: 45°22′00″N 7°37′53″E

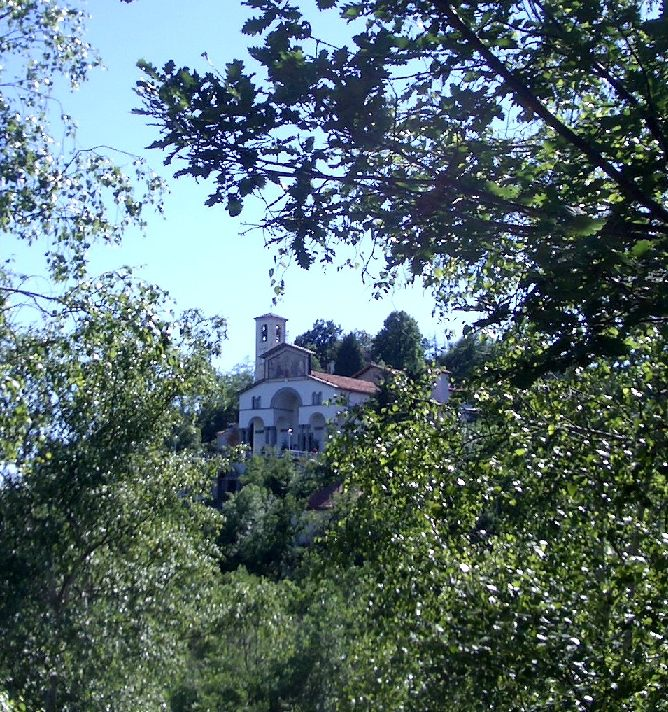
View of the sanctuary.

The Sacred Mountain of Belmonte (Italian: Sacro Monte di Belmonte) is a Roman Catholic devotional complex in the comune of Valperga, in the Metropolitan City of Turin (Piedmont, northern Italy). It is one of the nine Sacri Monti of Piedmont and Lombardy, included in UNESCO World Heritage list.

== Description ==
It was built in 1712 at the initiative of the Friar Minor Michelangelo da Montiglio. After interruptions, building work on the chapel was resumed in 1759 and in 1825.

The complex is located in Canavese and is dedicated to the Mysteries of the Rosary; it comprises a church (Sanctuary) and several chapels. The chapels are built at set intervals: the details of their construction, the shapes and the embellishment used are often identical, which suggest that they are the work of a single anonymous architect.
