= Valperga =

- Comune
- Comune di Valperga
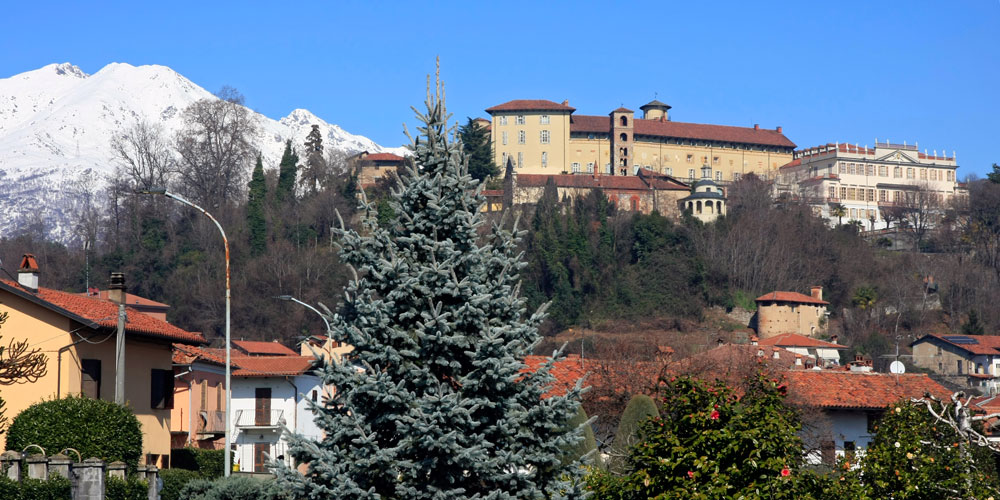

- Coat of arms

- Location within Italy Location within Piedmont
- Coordinates: 45°22′N 7°39′E
- Country: Italy
- Region: Piedmont
- Metropolitan city: Turin (TO)

Government
  - Mayor: Gabriele Francisca

Area
  - Total: 11.8 km^{2} (4.6 sq mi)

Population (31 December 2014)
  - Total: 3,180
  - Density: 269/km^{2} (698/sq mi)
- Demonym: Valperghesi
- Time zone: UTC+1 (CET)
  - Summer (DST): UTC+2 (CEST)
- Postal code: 10087
- Dialing code: 0124
- Website: Official website

Valperga is a comune (municipality) in the Metropolitan City of Turin in the Italian region Piedmont, located about 35 kilometres (22 mi) north of Turin, in the Canavese historical region.

It is home to the Sacro Monte of Belmonte, a site of pilgrimage and worship close to it. The Sacro Monte was built in 1712 at the initiative of the Friar Minor Michelangelo da Montiglio. In 2003, the sanctuary was inserted by UNESCO in the World Heritage List. The Valperga Castle is also located in the town.
