= Sparone =

Sparone Sparon (Piedmontese) Sparun (Arpitan)
- Comune
- Comune di Sparone
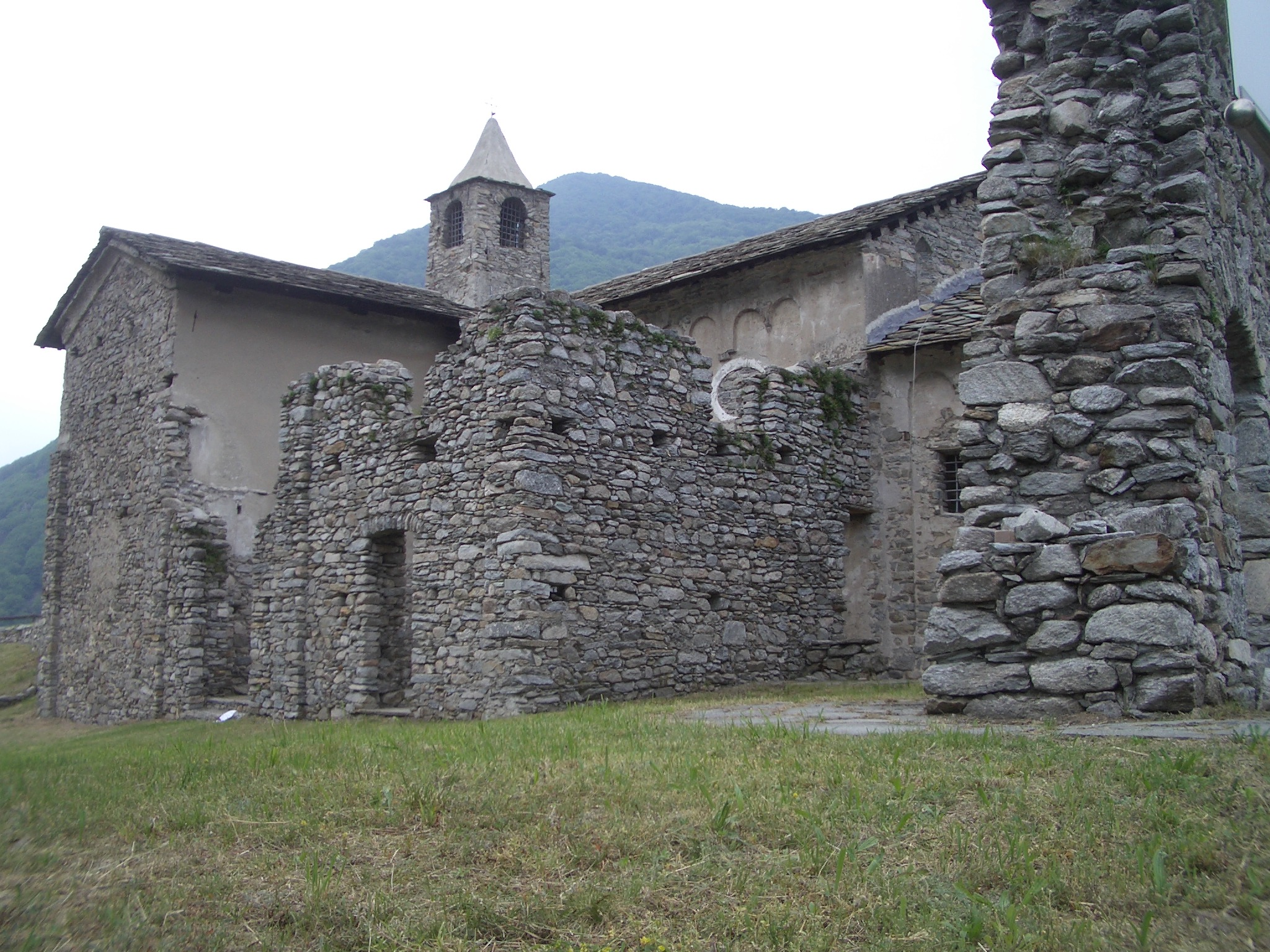
- Castle (Rocca) of King Arduin of Ivrea

- Coat of arms

- Location within Italy Location within Piedmont
- Coordinates: 45°25′N 7°33′E
- Country: Italy
- Region: Piedmont
- Metropolitan city: Turin (TO)

Government
  - Mayor: Anna Bonino

Area
  - Total: 29.5 km^{2} (11.4 sq mi)
- Elevation: 552 m (1,811 ft)

Population (31 December 2012)
  - Total: 1,115
  - Density: 37.8/km^{2} (97.9/sq mi)
- Demonym: Sparonesi
- Time zone: UTC+1 (CET)
  - Summer (DST): UTC+2 (CEST)
- Postal code: 10080
- Dialing code: 0124
- Patron saint: St. James the Apostle
- Saint day: 25 July
- Website: Official website

Sparone (Piedmontese: Sparon, Arpitan: Sparun) is a comune (municipality) in the Metropolitan City of Turin in the Italian region of Piedmont, located about 40 kilometres (25 mi) northwest of Turin in the Canavese.

It is home to the Romanesque church of Santa Croce, of medieval origin, which houses several Gothic frescoes.

The communal territory includes several frazioni: Aia di Pietra, Apparè, Barchero, Bisdonio, Bose, Budrer, Calsazio, Ceresetta, Costa, Feilongo, Frachiamo, Nosè, Onzino, Piani, Sommavilla, Torre, and Vasario.
