= Santi Pietro e Paolo, Burolo =

- Chiesa dei Santi Pietro e Paolo (Italian)
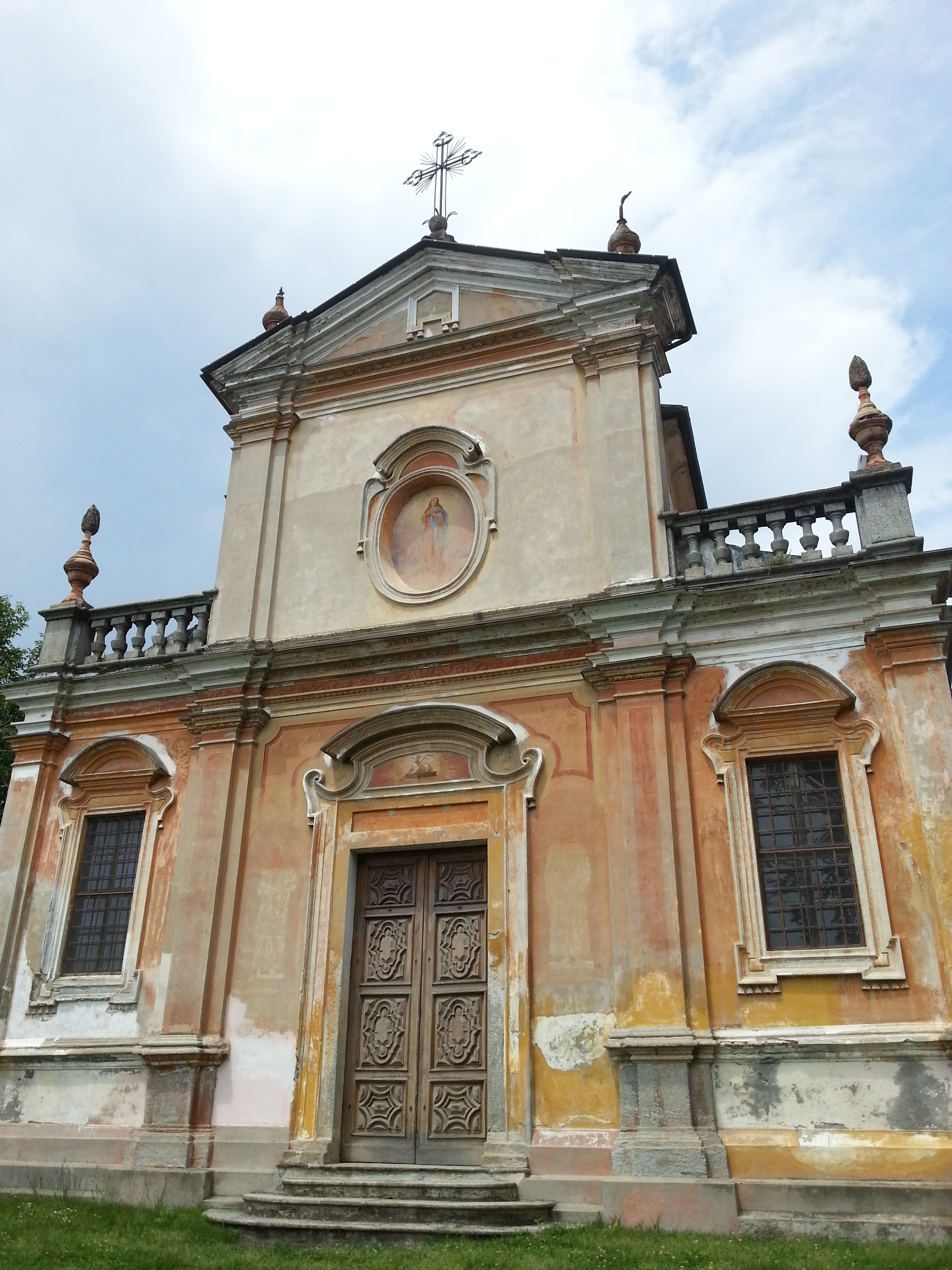
- Santi Pietro e Paolo, Burolo in 2020
- Click on the map for a fullscreen view
- 45°28′51.76″N 7°56′02.91″E
- Location: Andrate
- Country: Italy
- Denomination: Roman Catholic

Architecture
- Functional status: Active

Administration
- Diocese: Diocese of Ivrea

Santi Pietro e Paolo is a Roman Catholic church located in Burolo, Piedmont, Italy.

== History ==
The church, whose original structure dates back to 1193, was rebuilt in 1716 at the behest of Count Ceveris, partially occupying the site of the earlier parish church. Construction of the bell tower began in 1745.

== Description ==
The church stands in an elevated position and is reached via a staircase with concentric steps. Its façade is in the Baroque style.
