= Ciucarun =

- Torre di San Martino
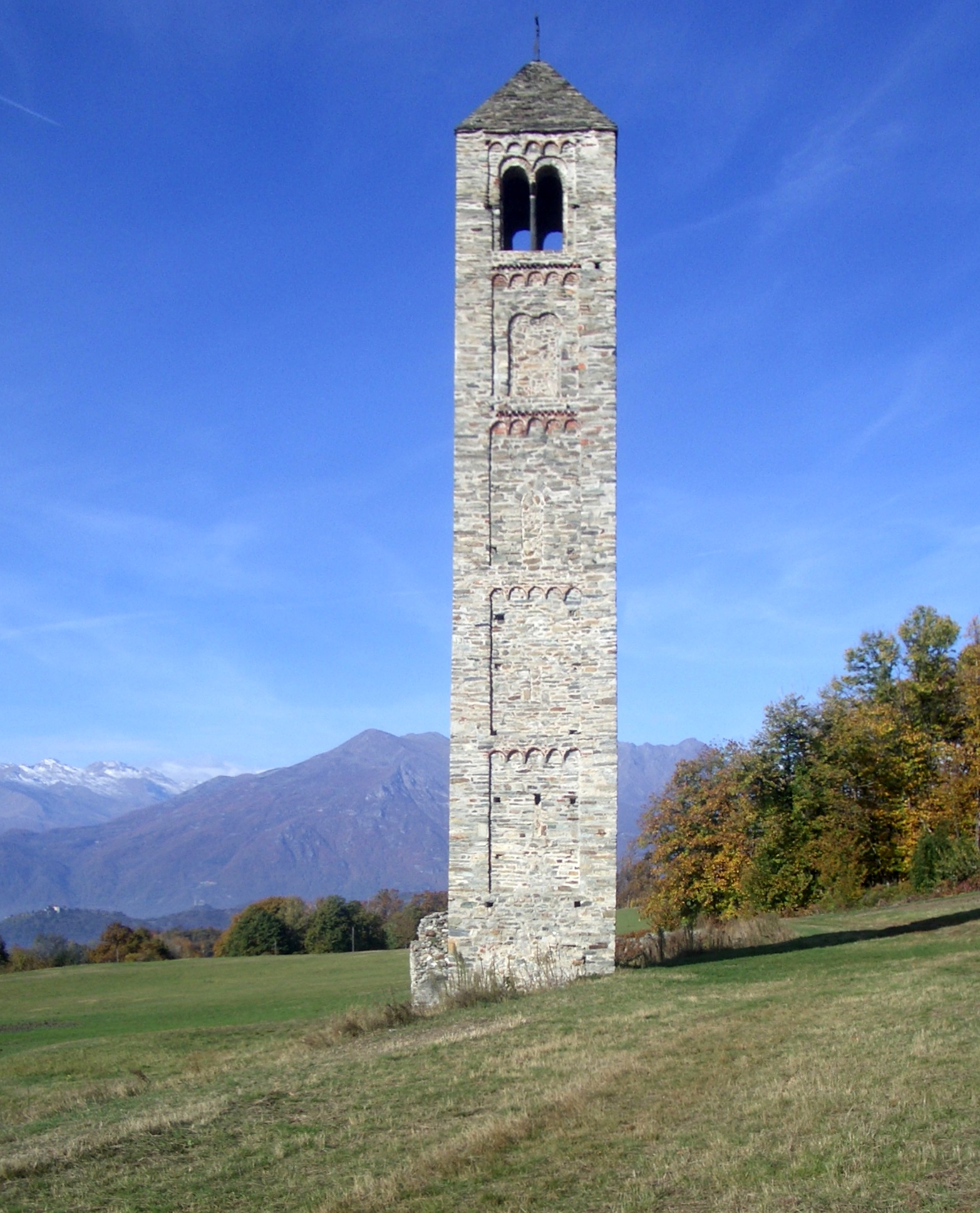
- Ciucarun in 2007
- Click on the map for a fullscreen view

General information
- Location: Bollengo, Italy
- Coordinates: 45°29′15.8″N 7°56′30.3″E

The Ciucarun is a medieval tower located in Bollengo, Piedmont, Italy.

== History ==
The tower dates back to the second half of the 11th century when it was built as the bell tower of the church of San Martino, which was then surrounded by the village of Paerno. Around 1250, the city of Ivrea, concerned by the expansionism of nearby Vercelli, invited the inhabitants of Paerno and the nearby village of Pessano to relocate to the new fortified settlement of Bollengo, offering them legal status equal to the citizens of Ivrea. The population of Paerno complied and abandoned their original site, which gradually fell into ruin.

The church of San Martino continued to function for centuries, though a 1477 document records its demotion from a parish to a simple oratory. In 1731, a bishop's decree ordered the demolition of the church, described as having become a hideout for brigands, while sparing the bell tower, which survived as the sole existing remnant of the church of San Martino and the village of Paerno.

== Description ==
The tower, situated on the slopes of the Serra d'Ivrea, displays a Romanesque style and stands as a significant example of Romanesque architecture in the Canavese region.

The structure rises through six above-ground levels, articulated externally by a sequence of five Lombard bands connected to corner lesenes. The façades are marked by an orderly progression of openings, now walled up except for those on the uppermost level, with slit windows on the lower storeys, single-light windows in the middle levels, and biforas towards the top.
