= Santo Stefano di Sessano =

Coordinates: 45.5002°N 7.9122°E

- Chiesa di Santo Stefano di Sessano (Italian)
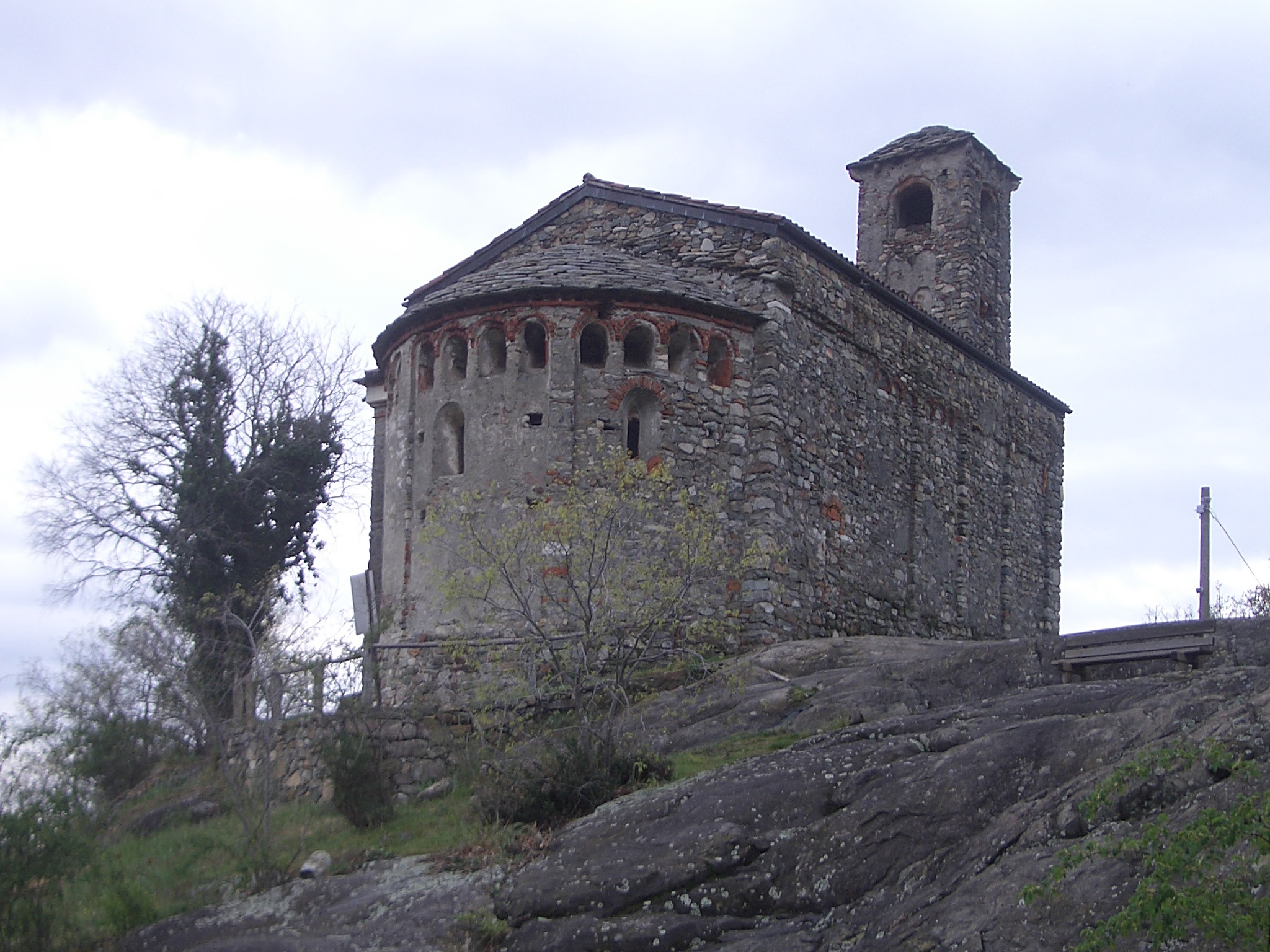
- Exterior view of the apse
- Click on the map for a fullscreen view
- Country: Italy
- Denomination: Roman Catholic

Architecture
- Functional status: Active

The church Santo Stefano di Sessano is all that remains of the village of Sessano, located on the rocky foreland to the east of the village of Chiaverano, which may have been abandoned after a landslide.

The 11th-century building has the characteristic features of the Romanesque churches in the area, such as the belltower in the center of the façade.

The actual building has a single nave three bays and an end apse. The sacristy was added to the apse during the Baroque period. The outside the apse is decorated with four lesene and twelve niches. Inside it preserves precious frescoes from the 11th century, featuring Christ and the four Evangelists, with 14 figures below representing the Apostles and saints.

== Gallery ==
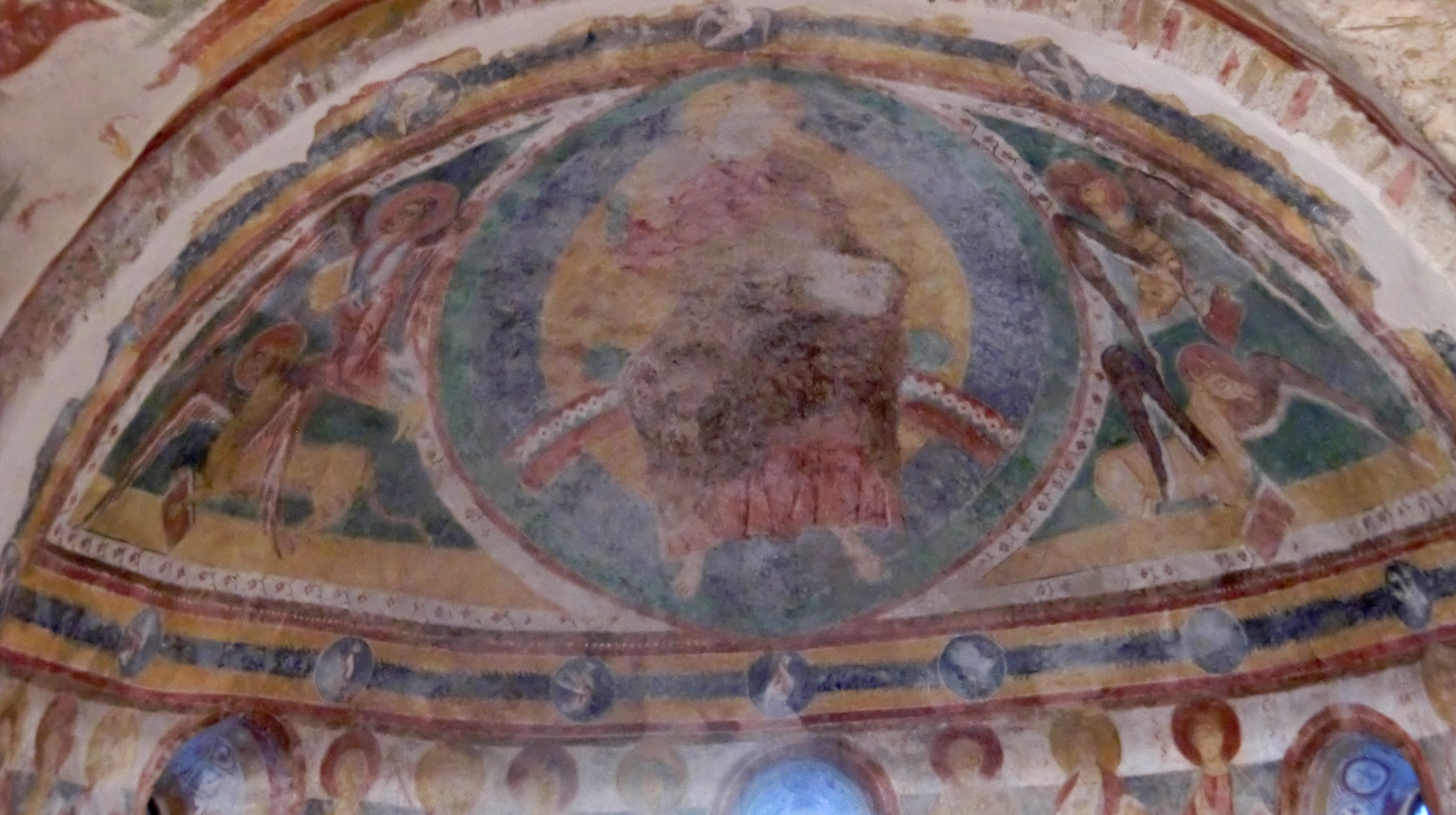

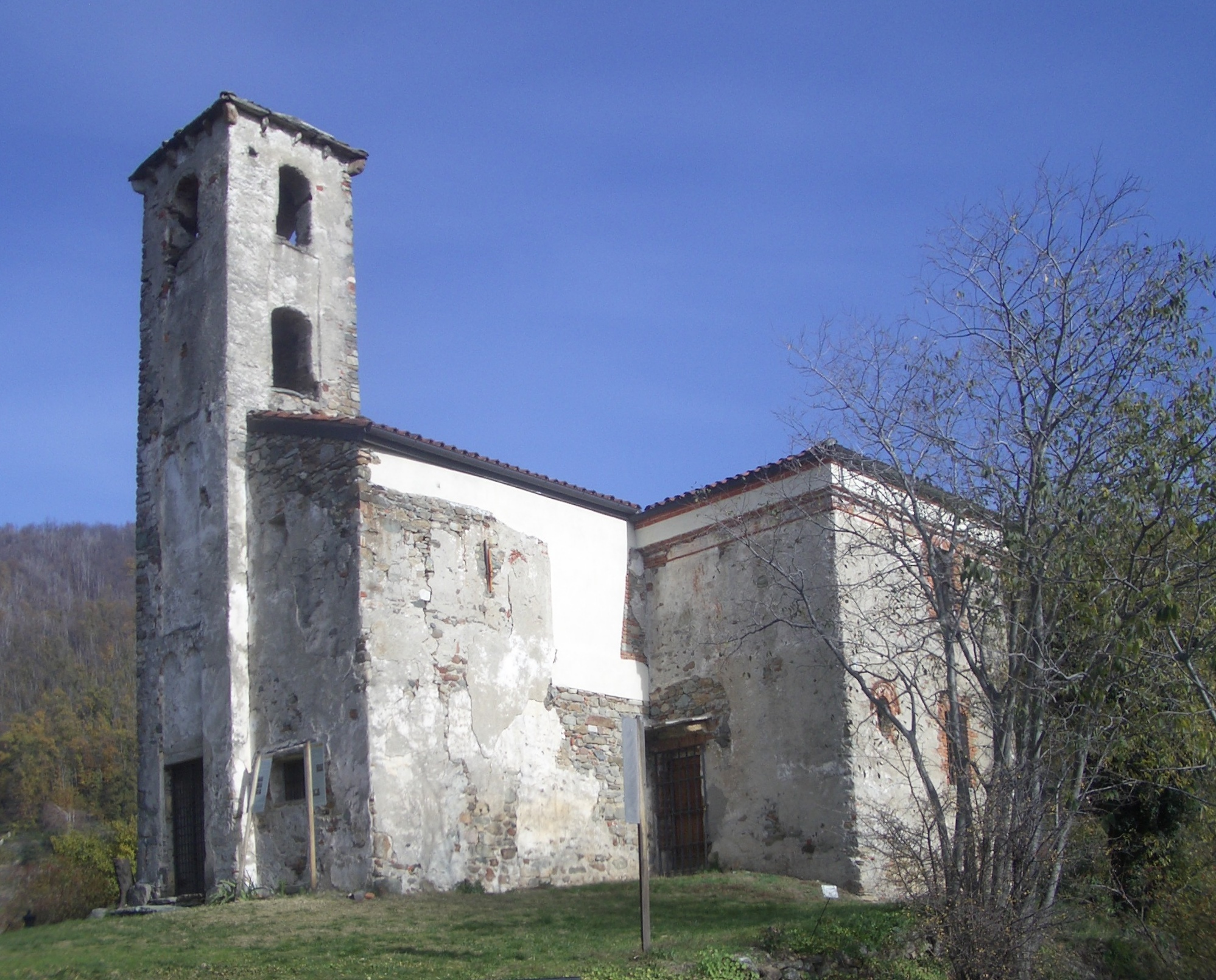

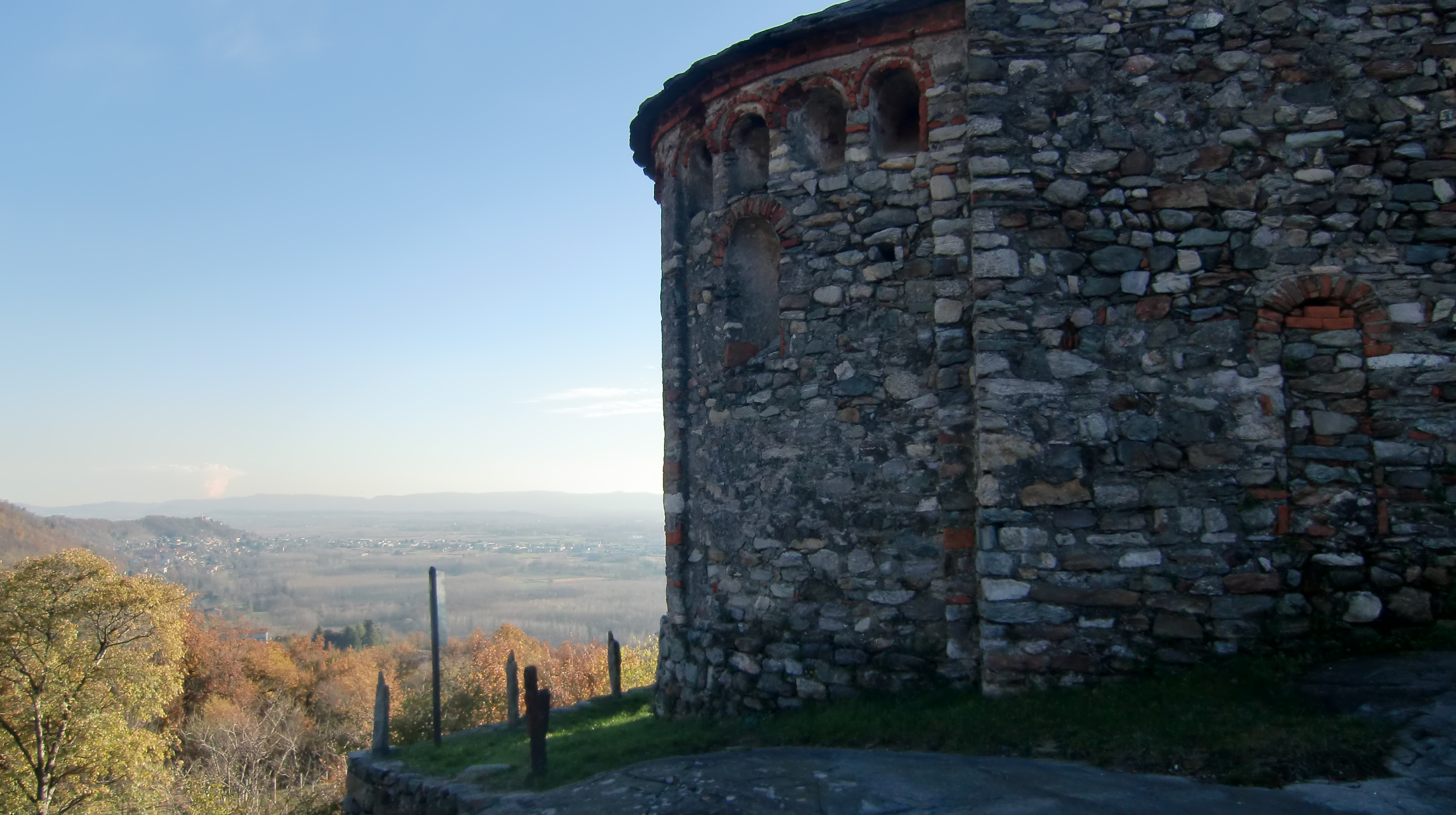

== Bibliography ==
- Franco Grosso, Il Cammino di San Carlo, 2011
- A. Moretto, Indagine aperta sugli affreschi del Canavese, 1973, Saluzzo, Stabilimento tipo-litografico G. Richard
- Comunità monastica di Bose (a cura della) La Serra: Chiese Romaniche, edizioni Qiqajon, Magnano (BI), 1999, ISBN 88-8227-056-4
- F. G. Ferrero, E. Formica, "Arte medievale nel Canavese", 2003, Ivrea, Priuli & Verlucca Editori, ISBN 88-8068-224-5

== See also ==
- Canavese
- Path of Saint Charles
