= Palazzo del Comune =

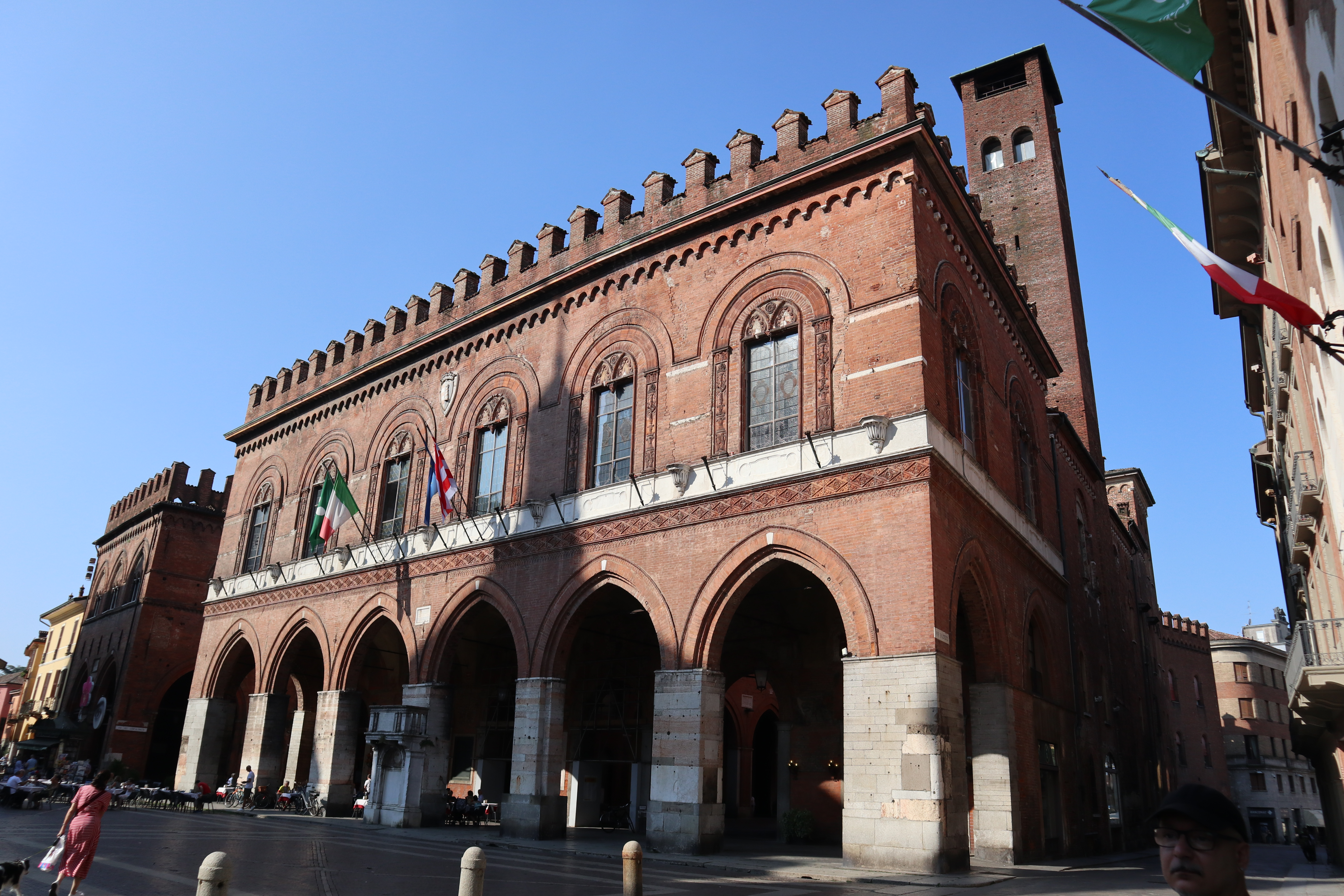
- Interactive map of the Palazzo del Comune area

General information
- Location: Cremona, Italy
- Coordinates: 45.133508°N 10.024461°E

The Palazzo del Comune is a historic building in the city of Cremona in Lombardy region of Italy.

== History ==
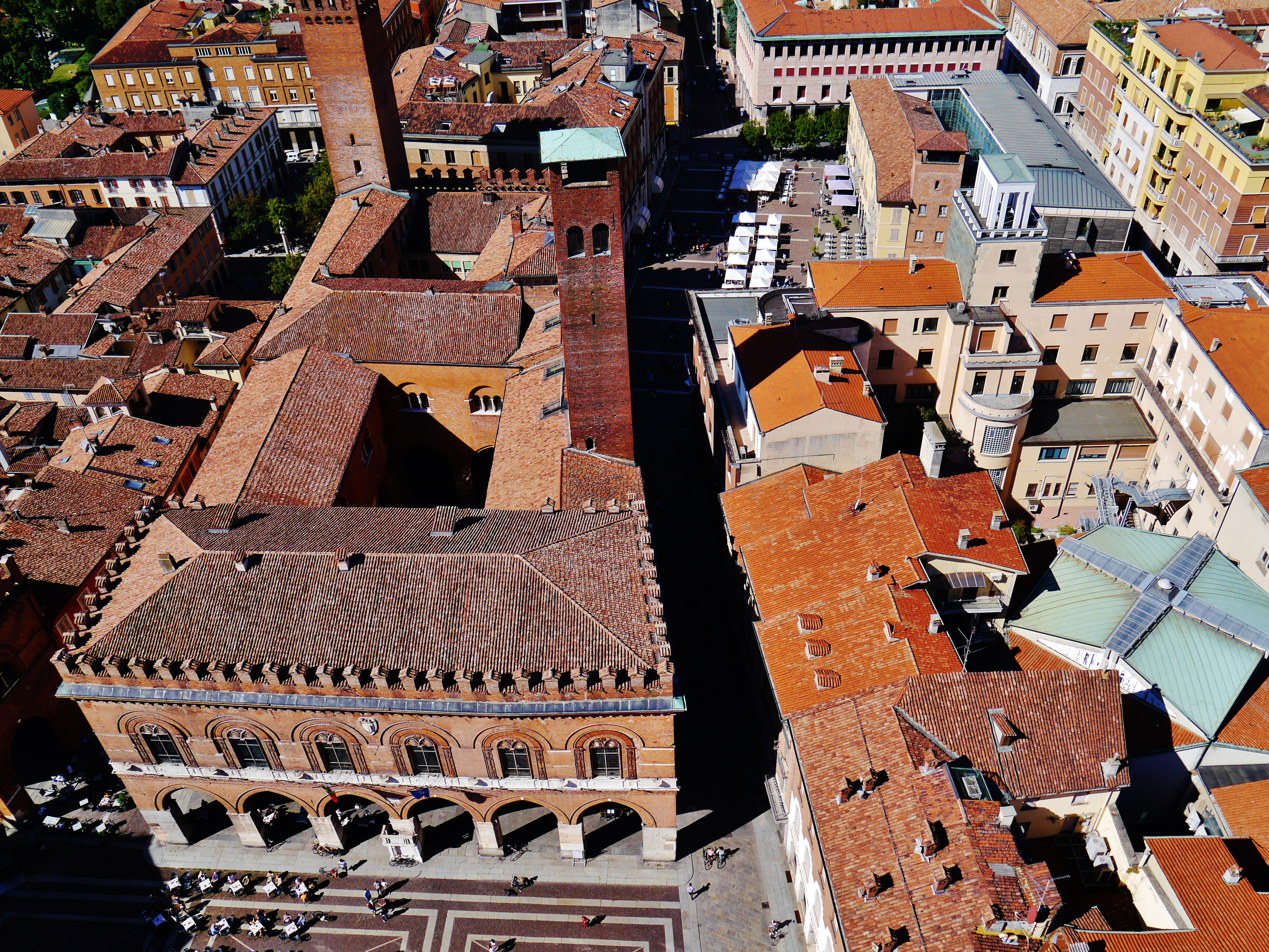
The complex seen from Torrazzo.

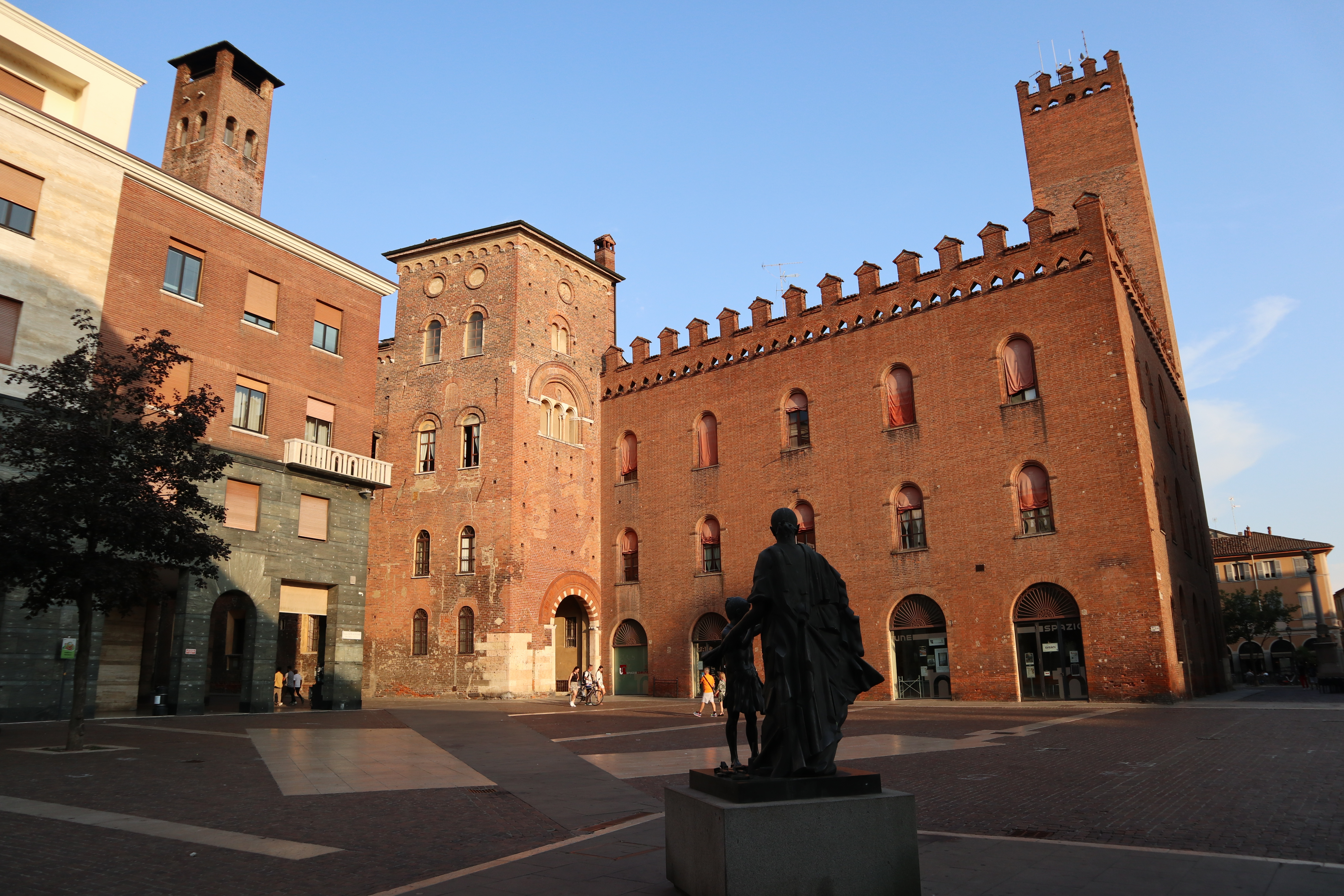
The back of the Guardiola.

The palace was built in 1206, designed by the architect Valerio Tommasinoo. It stands on the site of a pre-existing one, in the typical architectural form of the Lombard broletto, which was later expanded and remodelled several times over the centuries.

== Description ==
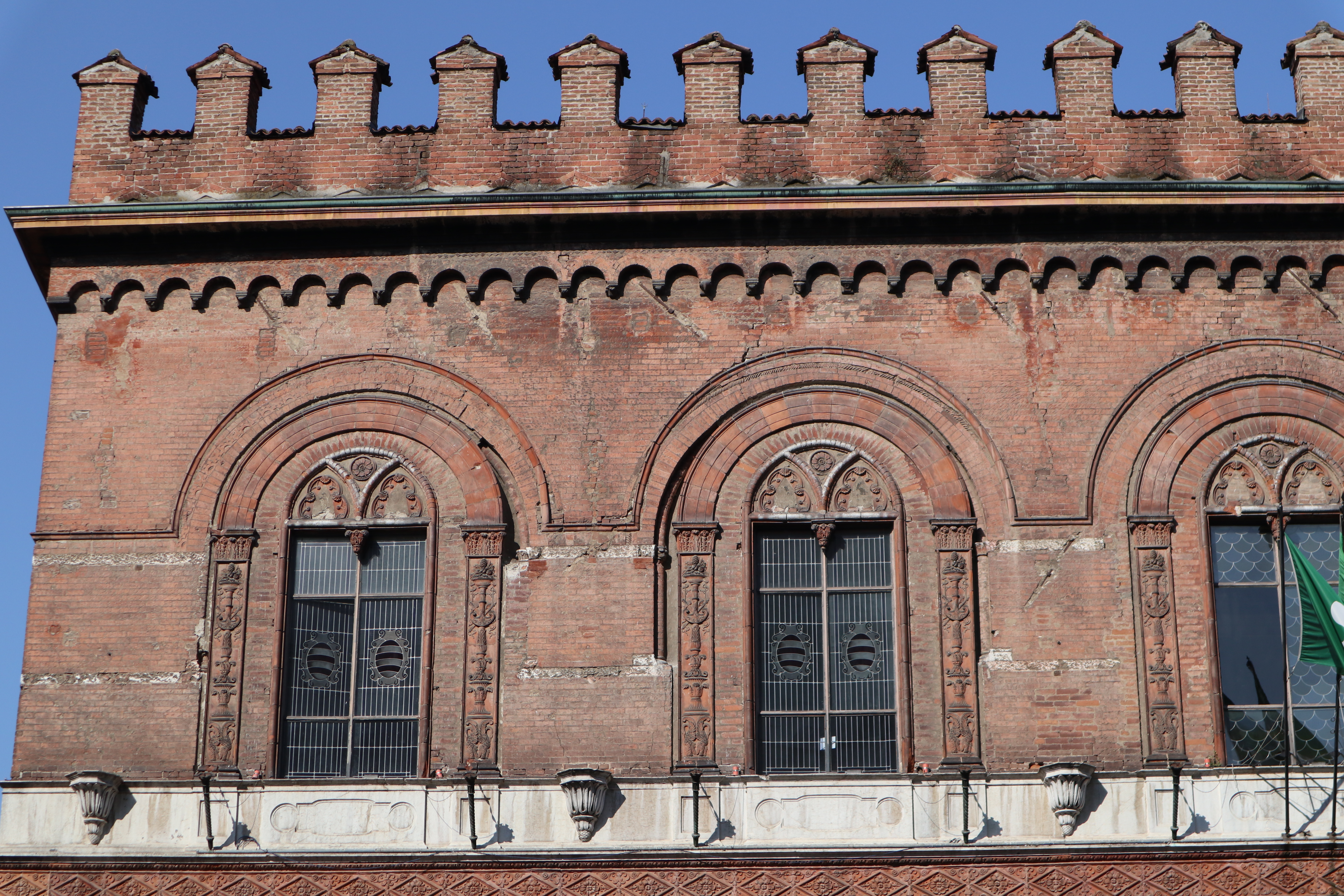
The large windows on the first floor.

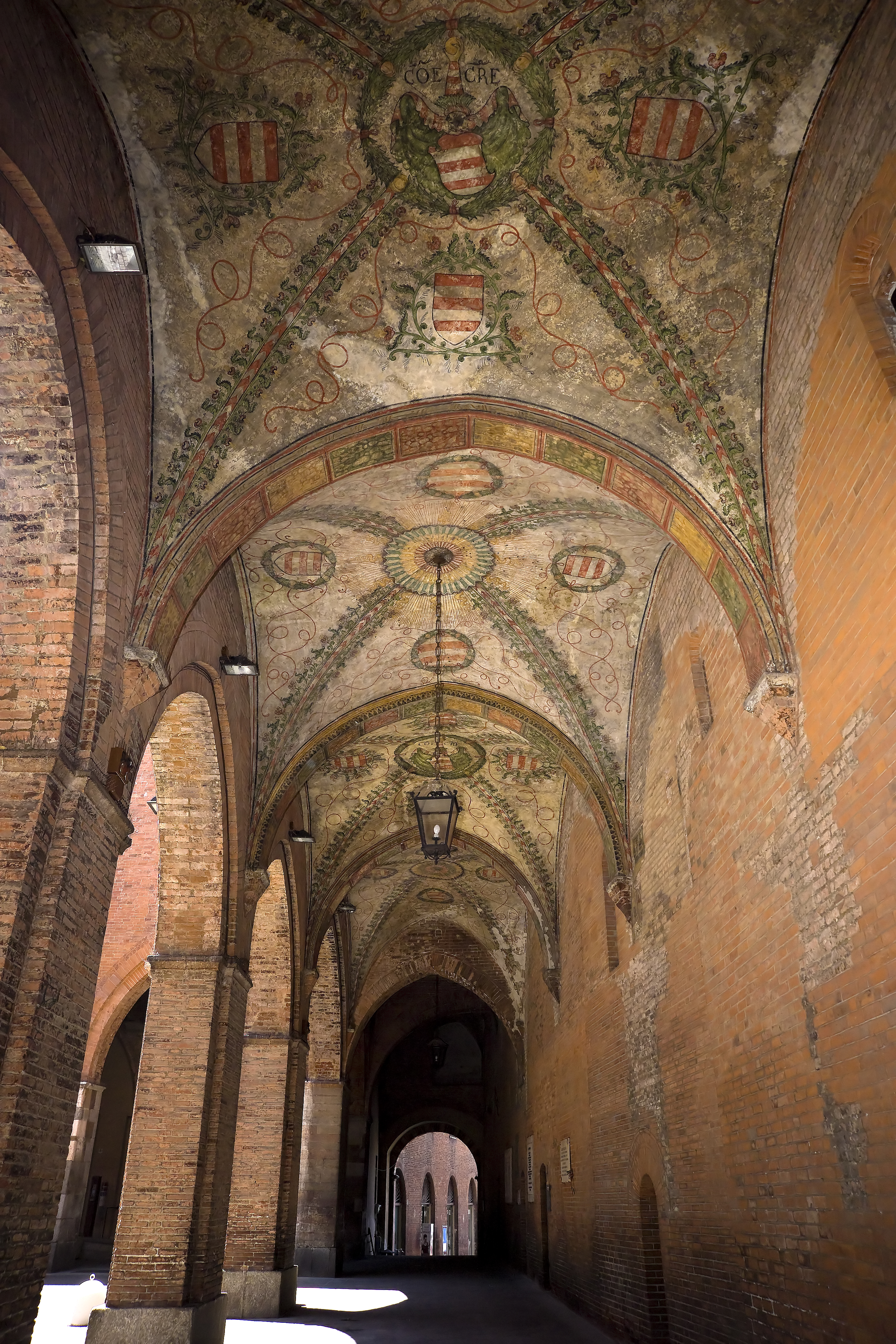
Portico of the first courtyard.

=== External ===
The rest of the complex is more heterogeneous, consisting of buildings added during later construction phases. On the right side stands the civic tower, topped by a bell chamber that originally housed two bells of different sizes: the small one for convening the City Council and the large one for warning of fires or announcing convictions; both were rung on the feast of Saint Homobonus.

=== The rooms ===
Several rooms house works of art:

- Sala degli Alabardieri is decorated with some 13th-century frescoes (including Saint Christopher being strangely crowned)
