= Sant'Antonio da Padova, Cascinette d'Ivrea =

Sant'Antonio da Padova
- Chiesa di Sant'Antonio da Padova (Italian)
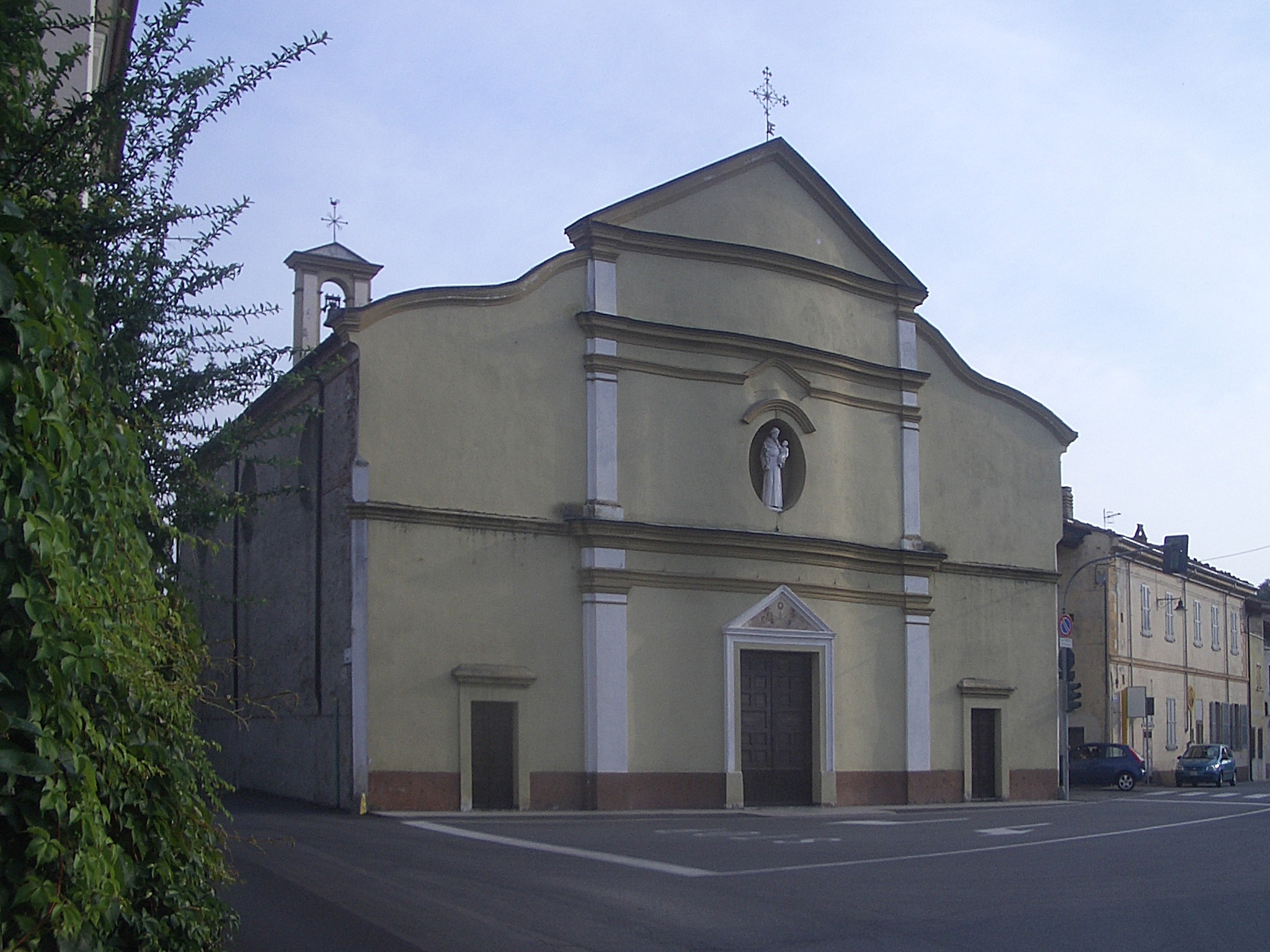
- Sant'Antonio da Padova, Cascinette d'Ivrea in 2009
- Click on the map for a fullscreen view
- 45°28′50.77″N 7°54′23.74″E
- Location: Cascinette d'Ivrea
- Country: Italy
- Denomination: Roman Catholic

Architecture
- Functional status: Active

Administration
- Diocese: Diocese of Ivrea

Sant'Antonio da Padova is a Roman Catholic church located in Cascinette d'Ivrea, Italy.

== History ==
The church was originally built as a chapel between 1764 and 1770, to serve the local community. In 1819, it became the seat of an independent parish, and was subsequently remodeled and enlarged in 1843.

== Description ==
The church features a three-aisled layout. The central nave extends to a raised presbytery, which terminates in a semicircular apse.

The façade, plain and symmetrical, clearly reflects the internal division into three aisles. It is enhanced by decorative moldings and features a central main entrance flanked by two smaller side doorways. The entire front is plastered and painted; above the central portal, beyond a molding, there is a niche containing a statue.

Inside, the nave is covered with decorated sail vaults.
