= Bollengo Castle =

- Castello di Bollengo
- Bollengo, Piedmont, Italy
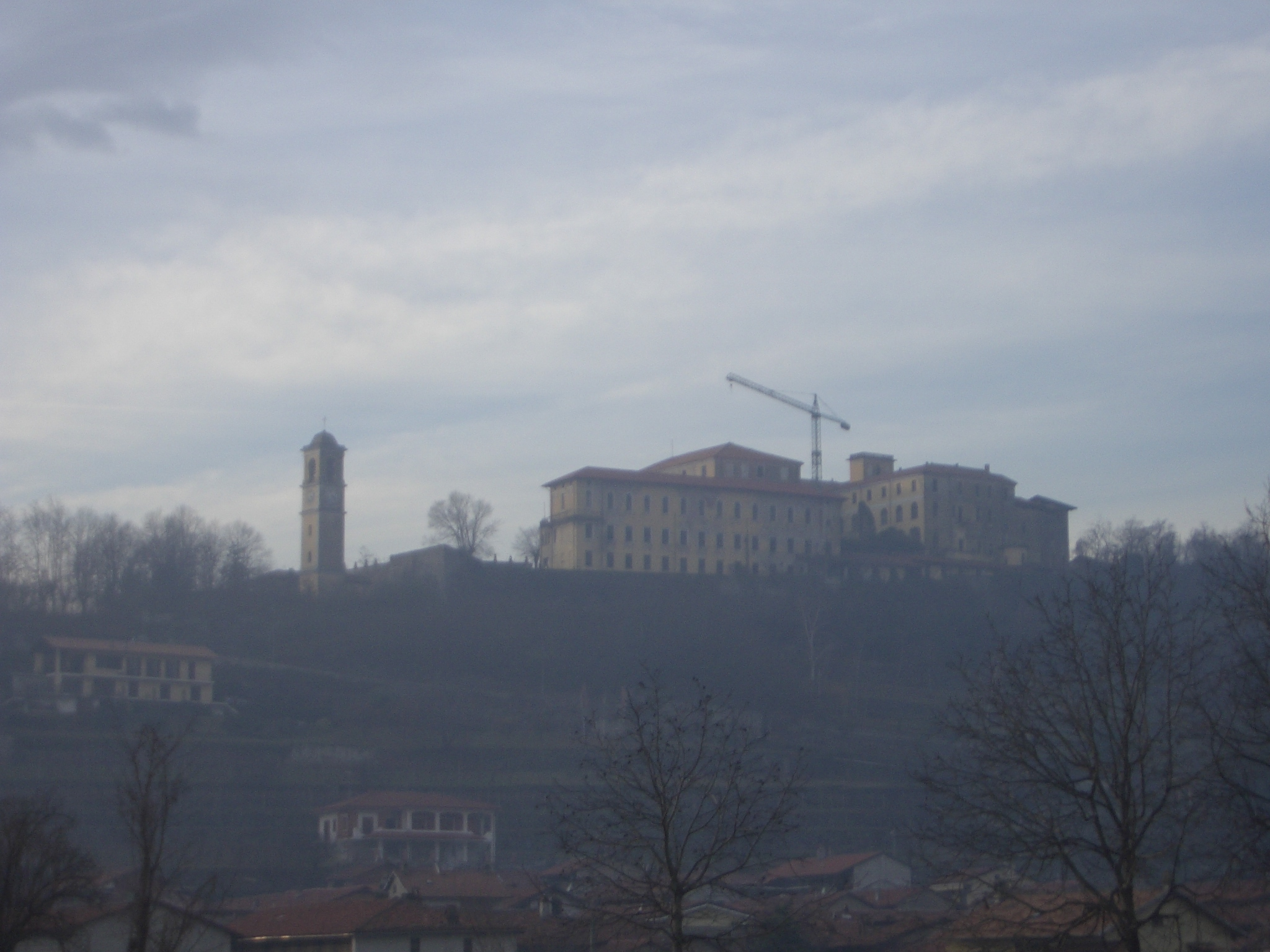
- Bollengo Castle

Site information
- Type: Castle

Location
- Location in Italy
- Coordinates: 45°28′28.72″N 7°56′25.54″E

Bollengo Castle (Italian: Castello di Bollengo) is a castle located in Bollengo, Piedmont, Italy.

== History ==
The castle originated under the initiative of the authorities of Ivrea, in competition with those of Vercelli. Construction began around the year 1200 and lasted until 1250. In 1708 was totally rebuilt. In the following centuries, it changed hands among various owners, including Count and Senator Costantino Nigra, who continued renovation works.

In the 1930s, the Society of Jesus had a 'house of studies' at the castle.
