= San Giuseppe Castle =

Castle in Piedmont, Italy

- Castello di San Giuseppe
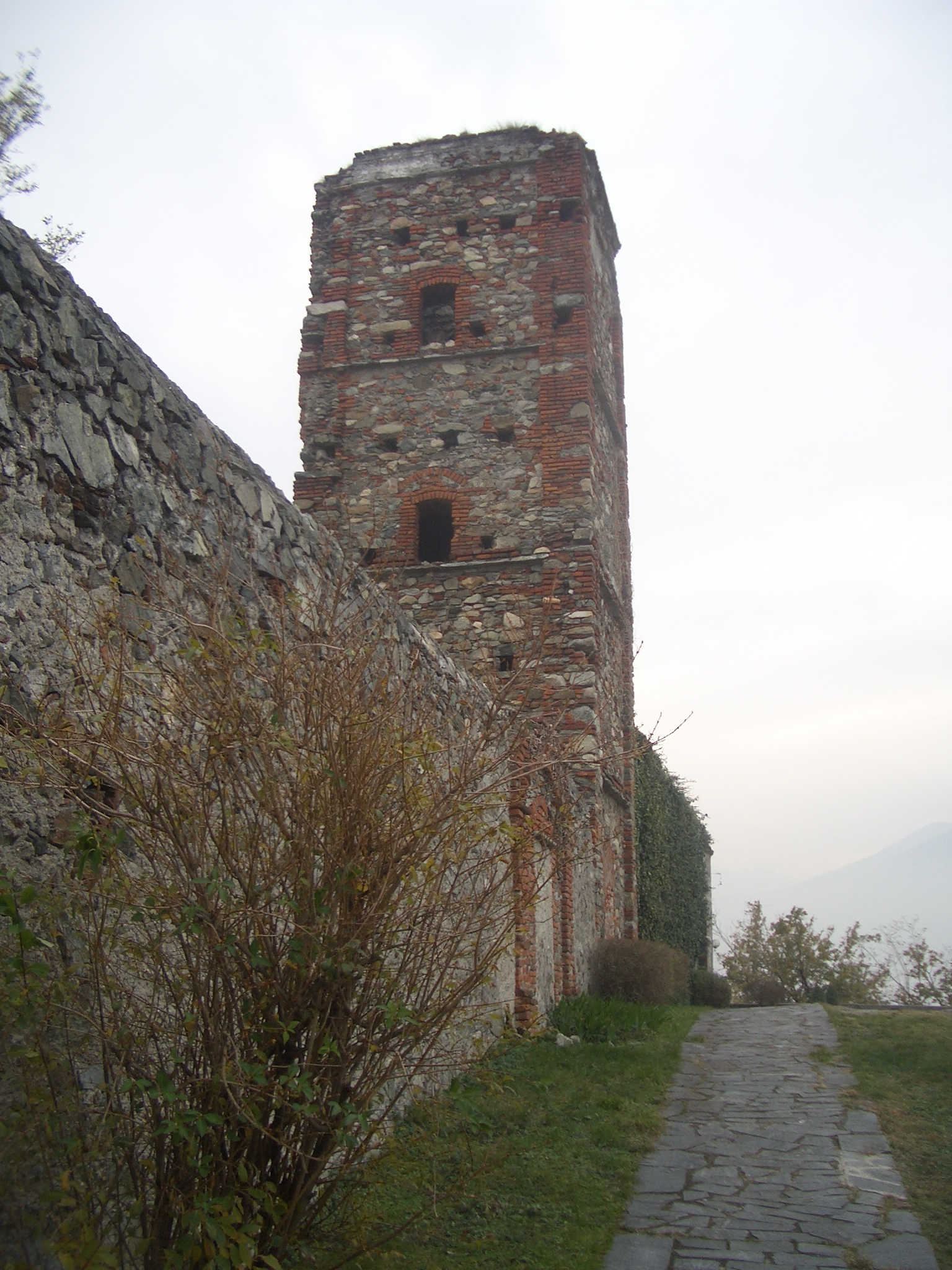
- San Giuseppe Castle in 2007
- Click on the map for a fullscreen view

General information
- Location: Chiaverano, Italy
- Coordinates: 45°29′28.66″N 7°53′36.95″E

San Giuseppe Castle (Italian: Castello di San Giuseppe) is a castle located in Chiaverano, Piedmont, Italy.

== History ==
The site has held significant historical importance as a military observation point—from the summit of Mount Albagna overlooking Lake Sirio—dating back to the ancient Romans during their war against the Salassi.

In 1640, Tomaso Barberio from Guarene, a veteran of the Savoy militia, withdrew into hermitage on the mountain where the castle now stands. There, he built a chapel dedicated to St. Joseph, inspired by a pre-existing votive shrine. In April 1661, the Bishop of Ivrea authorized the establishment of a confraternity, which soon welcomed 150 friars. The hermitage was initially entrusted to the Teresians and later to the Carmelites, who obtained permission from the Holy See to build a convent, which became known as the Convent of St. Joseph. For a long time, the site remained one of the most frequented sanctuaries in the region.

Converted into a fortification during the Napoleonic era, it later became a noble residence and a gathering place for artists and writers, including Arrigo Boito, Eleonora Duse, and Giuseppe Giacosa.

== Gallery ==
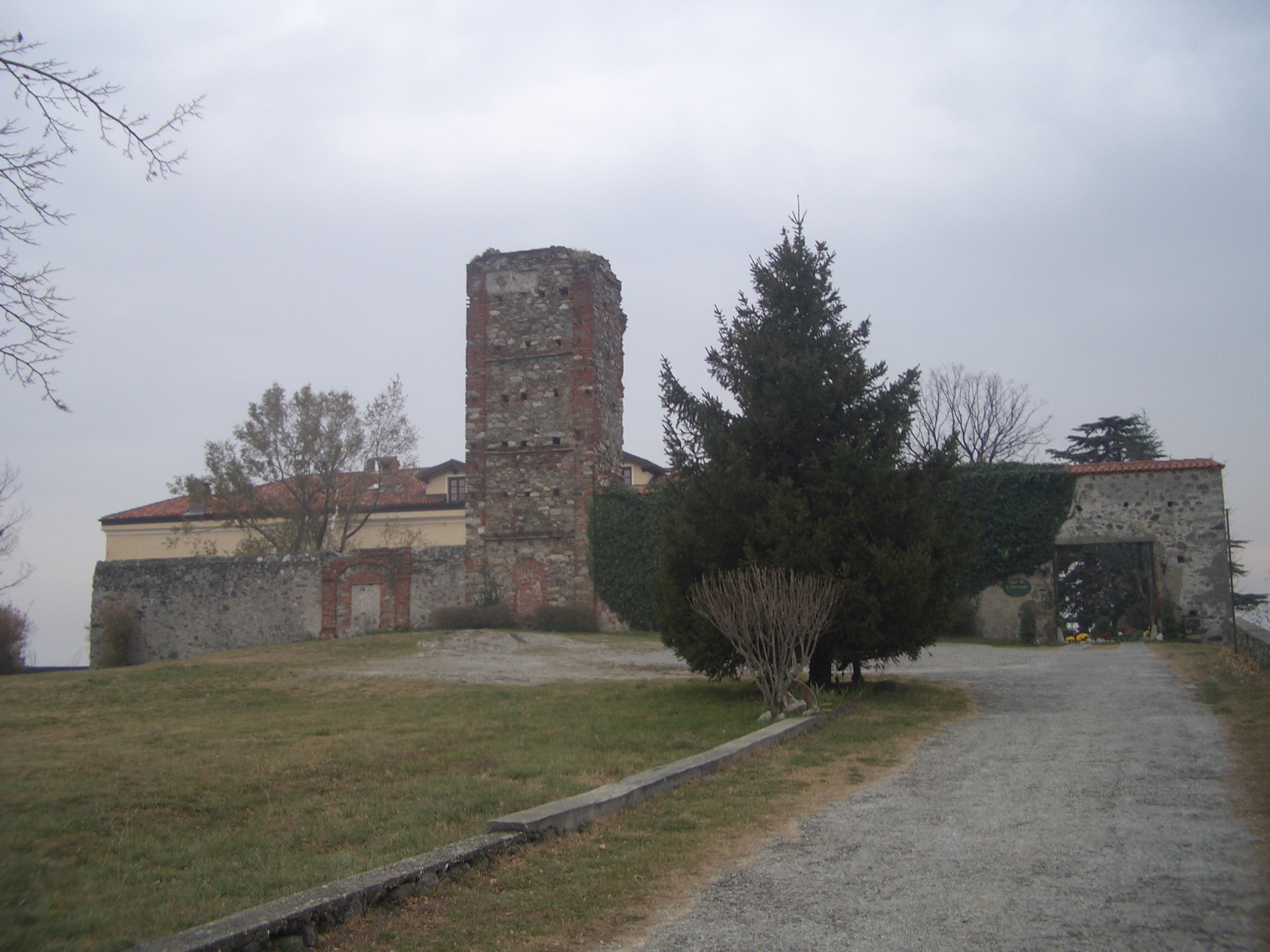

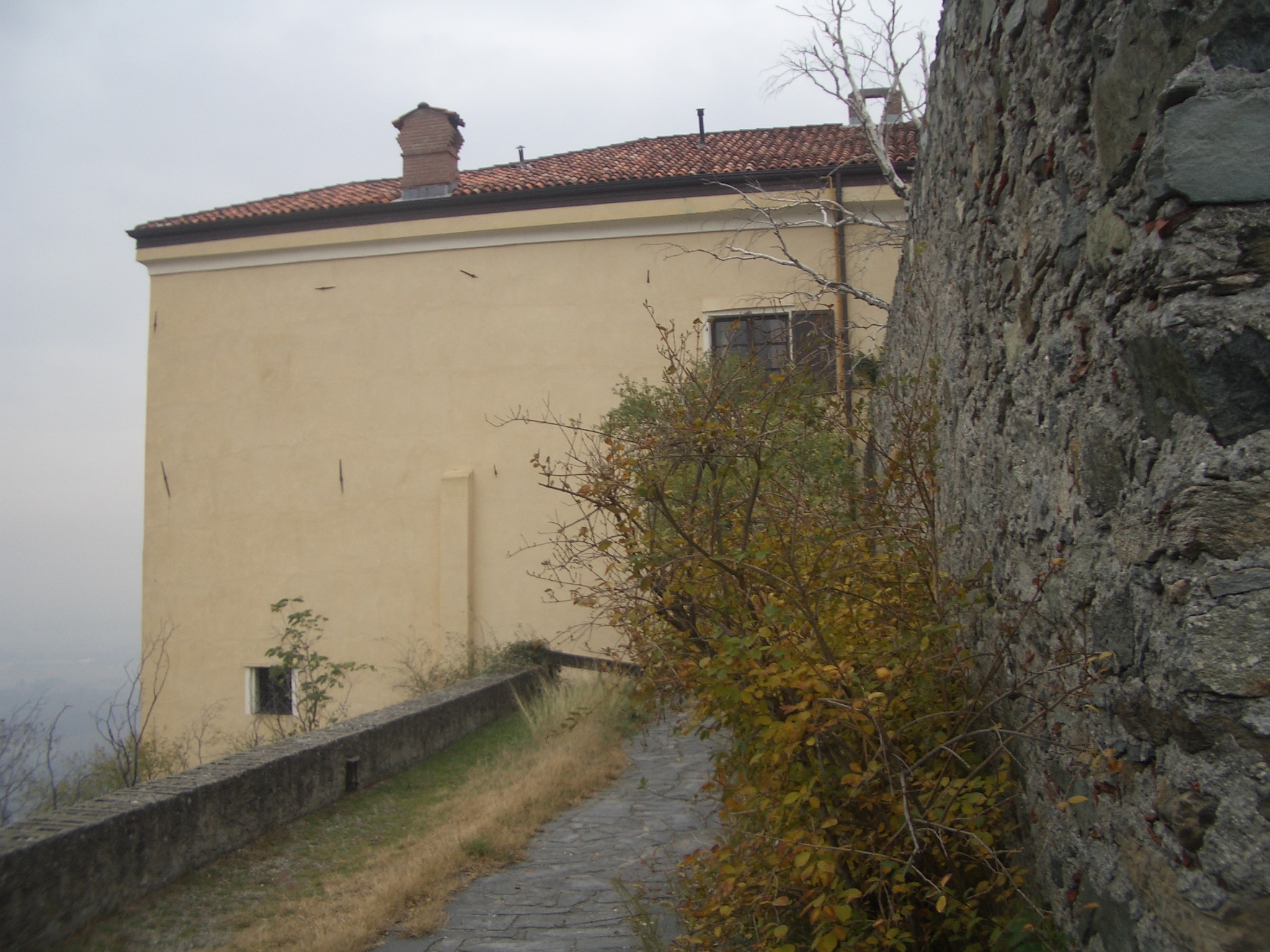

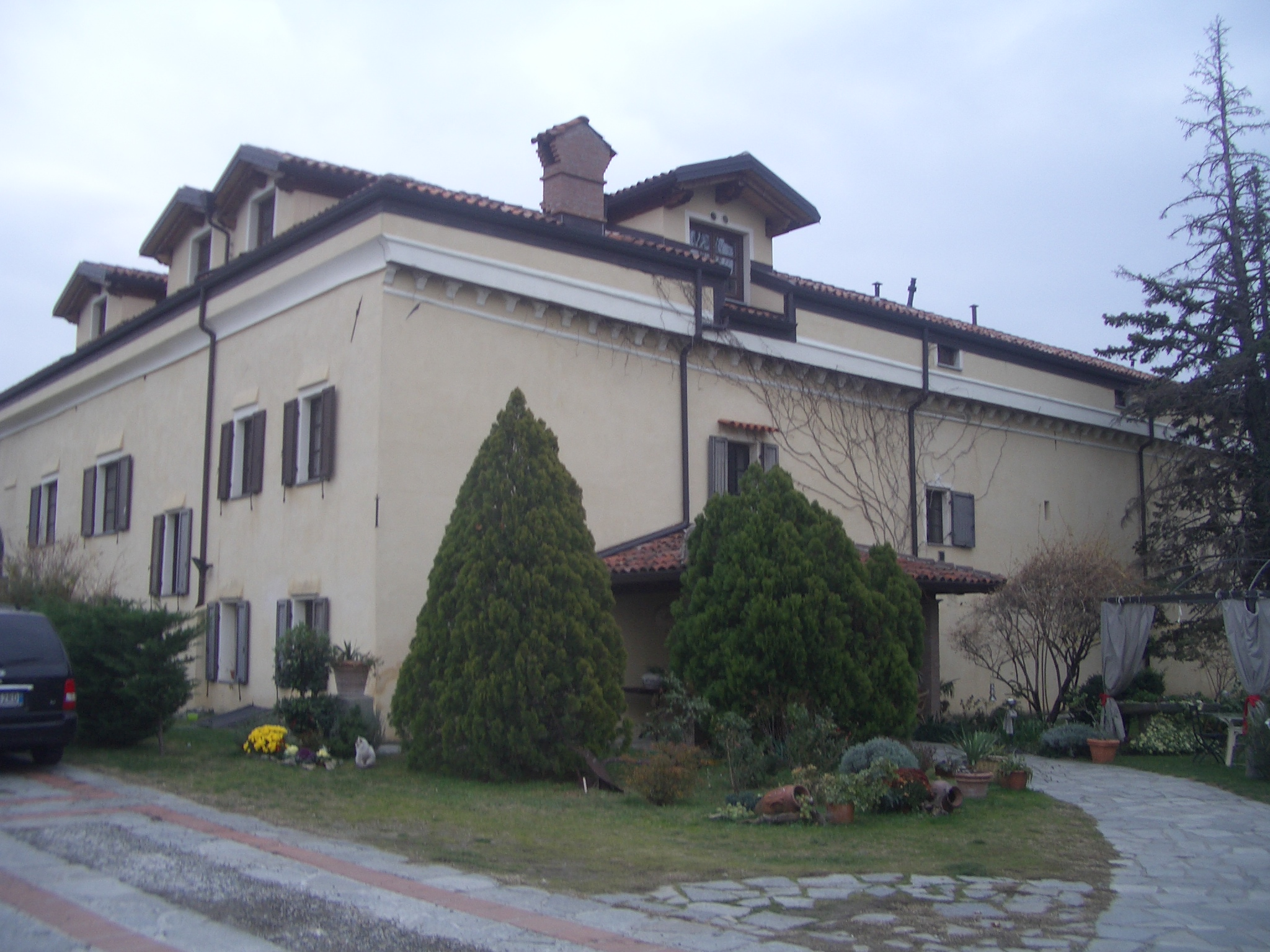
