= Cascinette d'Ivrea =

- Comune
- Comune di Cascinette d'Ivrea
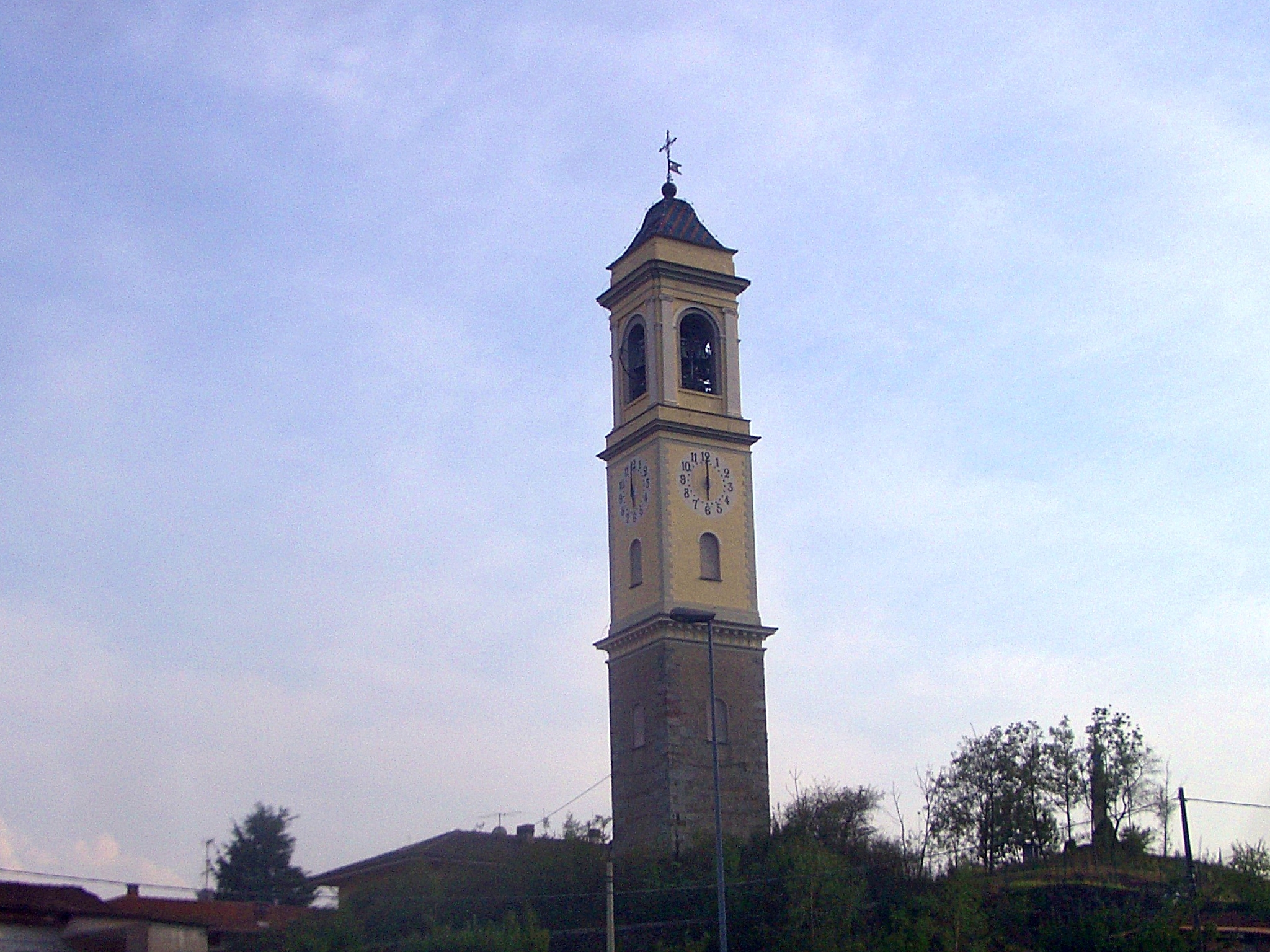

- Coat of arms

- Location within Italy Location within Piedmont
- Coordinates: 45°29′N 7°54′E
- Country: Italy
- Region: Piedmont
- Metropolitan city: Turin (TO)

Government
  - Mayor: Piero Osenga

Area
  - Total: 2.17 km^{2} (0.84 sq mi)
- Elevation: 239 m (784 ft)

Population (1-1-2017)
  - Total: 1,545
  - Density: 712/km^{2} (1,840/sq mi)
- Demonym: Cascinettese(i)
- Time zone: UTC+1 (CET)
  - Summer (DST): UTC+2 (CEST)
- Postal code: 10010
- Dialing code: 0125
- Patron saint: St. Anthony

Cascinette d'Ivrea is a comune (municipality) in the Metropolitan City of Turin in the Italian region Piedmont, located about 50 kilometres (31 mi) northeast of Turin.

Cascinette d'Ivrea borders the following municipalities: Chiaverano, Burolo, and Ivrea.
