= Bollengo =

- Comune
- Comune di Bollengo
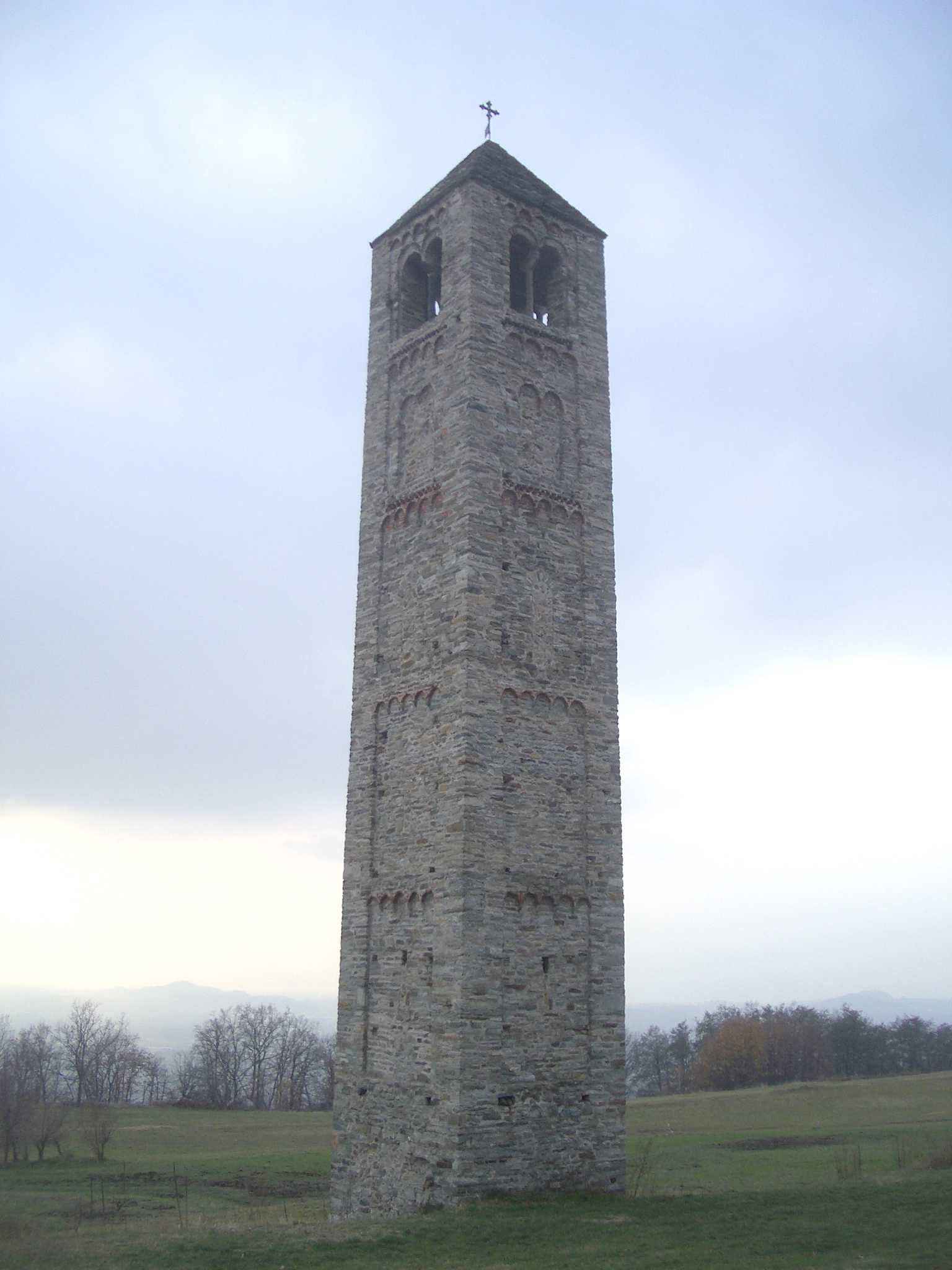
- St. Martin's bell tower.

- Coat of arms

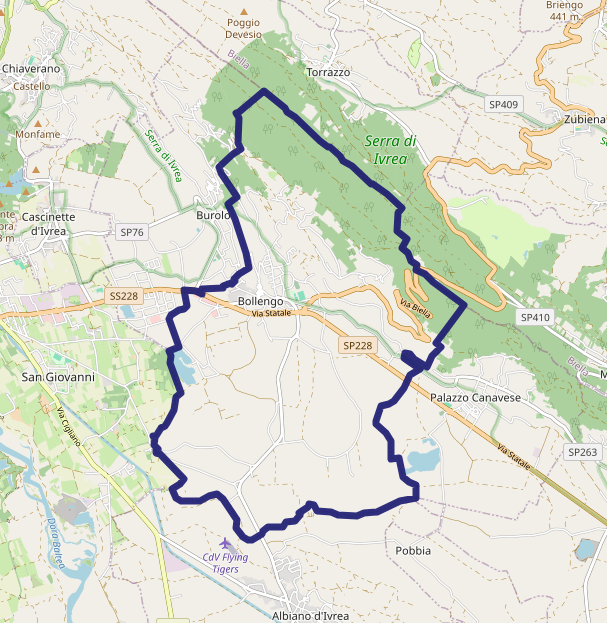
- OMS map of Bollengo

- Location within Italy Location within Piedmont
- Coordinates: 45°28′N 7°57′E
- Country: Italy
- Region: Piedmont
- Metropolitan city: Turin (TO)

Government
  - Mayor: Luigi Sergio Ricca

Area
  - Total: 14.22 km^{2} (5.49 sq mi)

Population (1-1-2017)
  - Total: 2,141
  - Density: 150.6/km^{2} (390.0/sq mi)
- Demonym: Bollenghino(i)
- Time zone: UTC+1 (CET)
  - Summer (DST): UTC+2 (CEST)
- Postal code: 10012
- Dialing code: 0125
- Patron saint: St. Eusebius
- Saint day: First Sunday in August
- Website: Official website

Bollengo is a comune (municipality) in the Metropolitan City of Turin in the Italian region Piedmont, about 50 kilometres (31 mi) northeast of Turin. It borders the municipalities of Torrazzo, Burolo, Ivrea, Palazzo Canavese, Magnano, Albiano d'Ivrea and Azeglio.

== Castle ==
In Bollengo there is an ancient castle.
