= Torrazzo =

- Comune
- Comune di Torrazzo
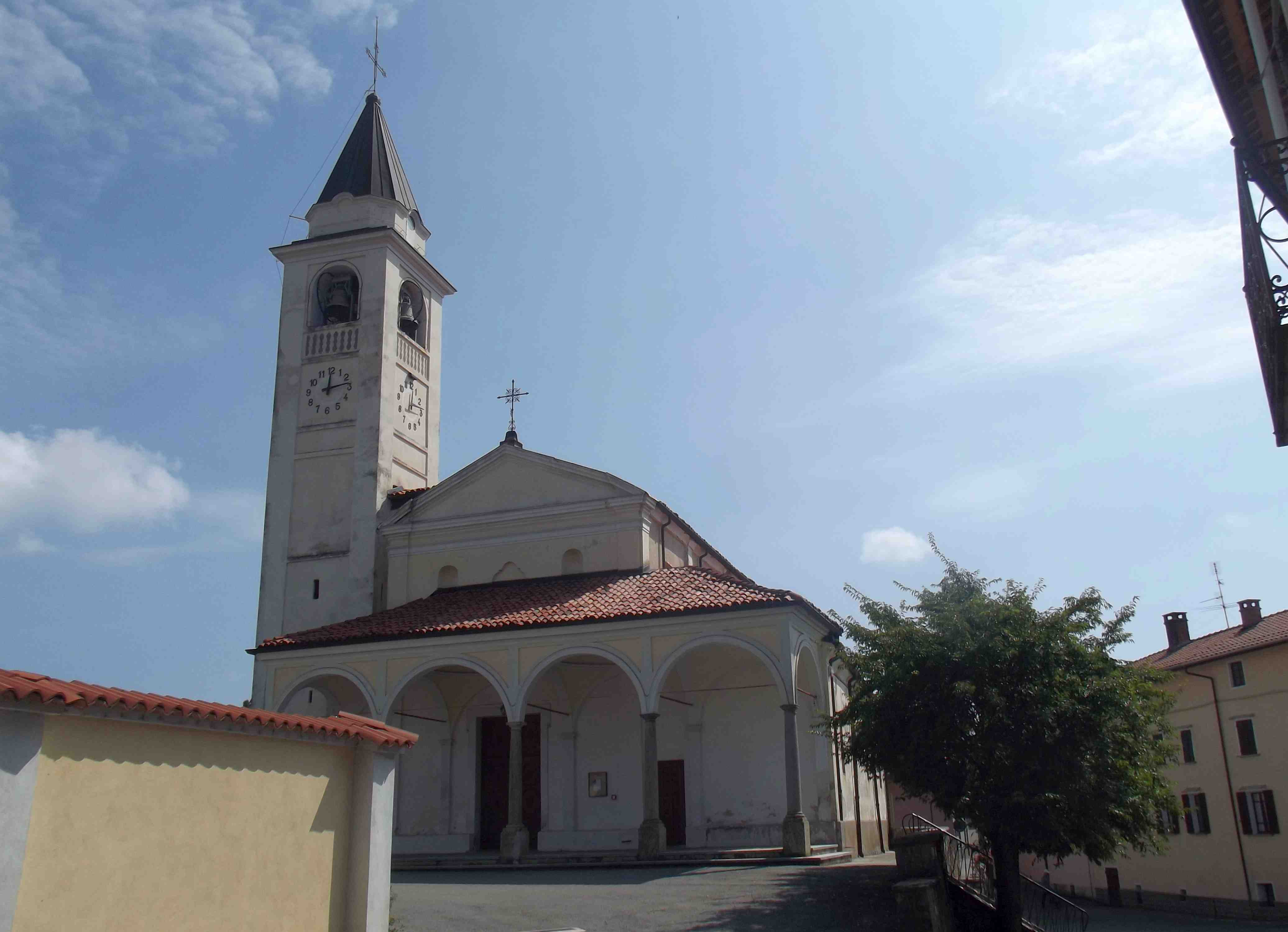
- Church in Torrazzo

- Location within Italy Location within Piedmont
- Coordinates: 45°29′56″N 7°57′13″E
- Country: Italy
- Region: Piedmont
- Province: Biella (BI)

Government
  - Mayor: Sandro Menaldo

Area
  - Total: 5.8 km^{2} (2.2 sq mi)
- Elevation: 622 m (2,041 ft)

Population (31 December 2010)
  - Total: 227
  - Density: 39/km^{2} (100/sq mi)
- Demonym: Torrazzesi
- Time zone: UTC+1 (CET)
  - Summer (DST): UTC+2 (CEST)
- Postal code: 13884
- Dialing code: 015
- Website: Official website

Torrazzo is a comune (municipality) in the Province of Biella in the Italian region Piedmont, located about 50 kilometres (31 mi) northeast of Turin and about 13 kilometres (8 mi) southwest of Biella.

Torrazzo borders the following municipalities: Bollengo, Burolo, Chiaverano, Magnano, Sala Biellese, Zubiena.
