= Burolo =

- Comune
- Comune di Burolo
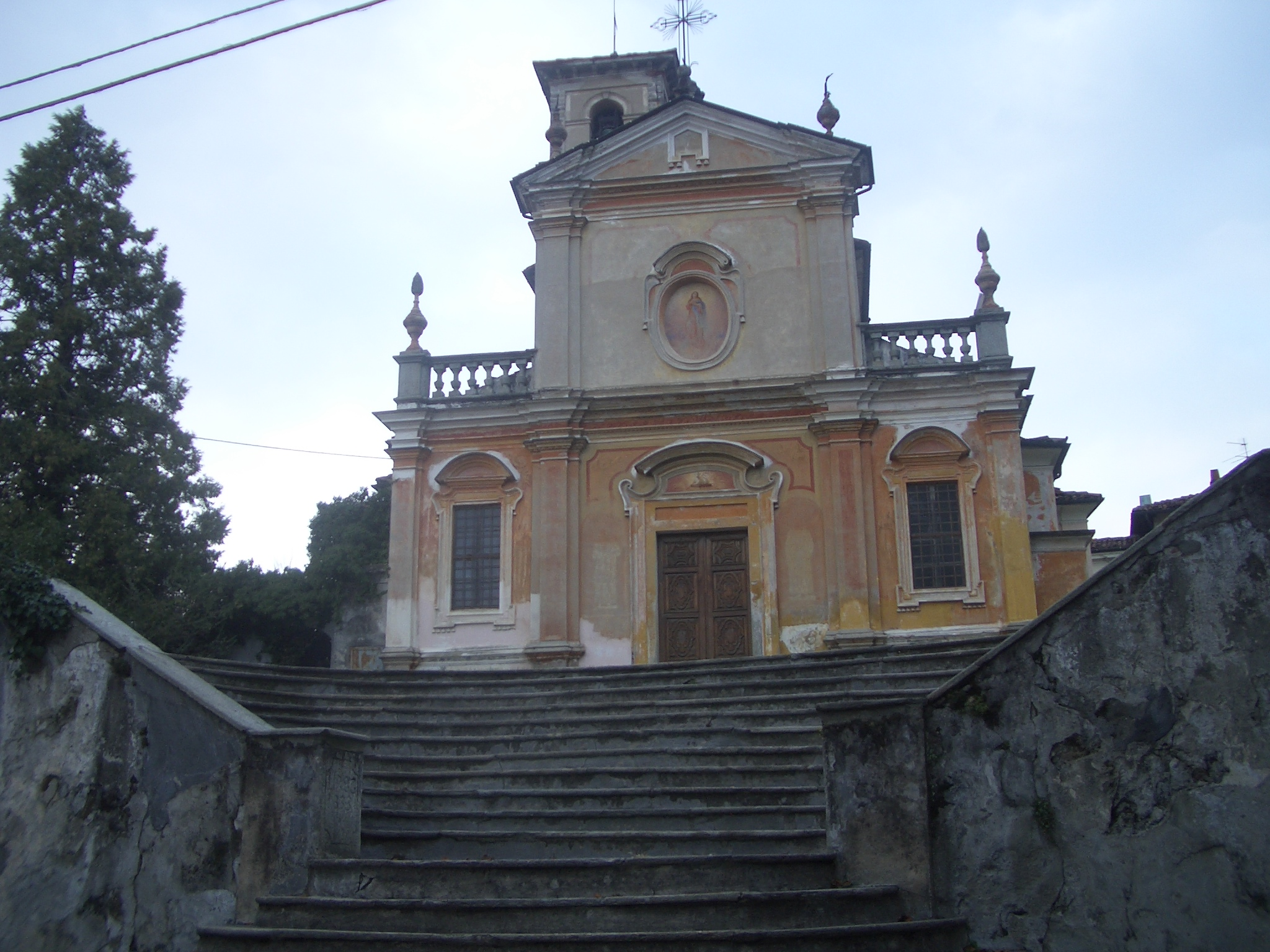

- Coat of arms

- Location within Italy Location within Piedmont
- Coordinates: 45°29′N 7°56′E
- Country: Italy
- Region: Piedmont
- Metropolitan city: Turin (TO)

Government
  - Mayor: Franco Cominetto

Area
  - Total: 5.48 km^{2} (2.12 sq mi)
- Elevation: 276 m (906 ft)

Population (31 August 2021)
  - Total: 1,114
  - Density: 203/km^{2} (527/sq mi)
- Demonym: Burolesi
- Time zone: UTC+1 (CET)
  - Summer (DST): UTC+2 (CEST)
- Postal code: 10010
- Dialing code: 0125
- Patron saint: Sts. Peter and Paul
- Saint day: 29 June
- Website: Official website

Burolo is a comune (municipality) in the Metropolitan City of Turin in the Italian region Piedmont, located about 50 kilometres (31 mi) northeast of Turin.

Burolo borders the following municipalities: Chiaverano, Torrazzo, Bollengo, Ivrea, and Cascinette d'Ivrea.
