= Chiaverano =

- Comune
- Comune di Chiaverano
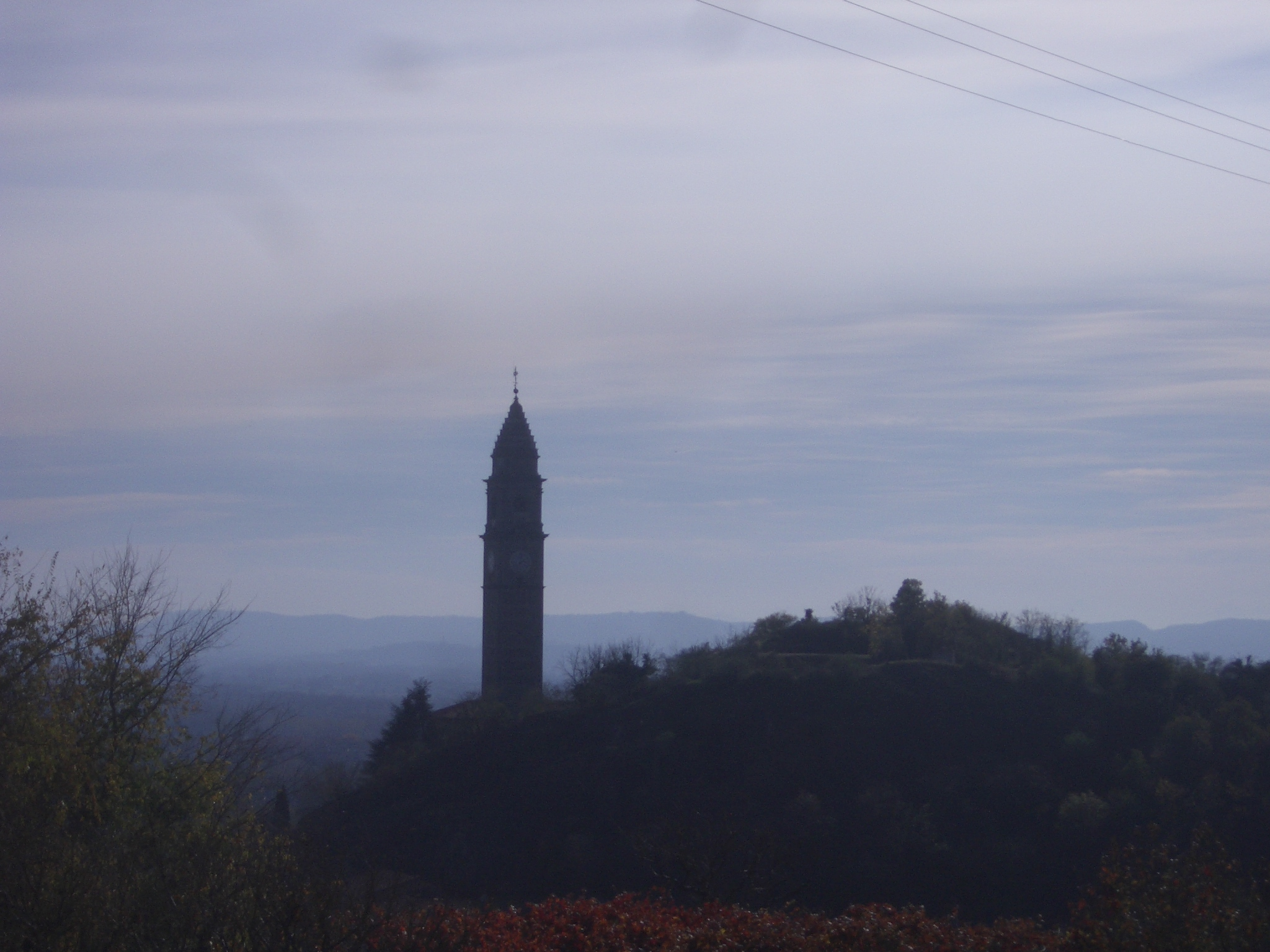

- Coat of arms

- Location within Italy Location within Piedmont
- Coordinates: 45°30′N 7°54′E
- Country: Italy
- Region: Piedmont
- Metropolitan city: Turin (TO)
- Frazioni: Bienca

Government
  - Mayor: Maurizio Fiorentini

Area
  - Total: 12.02 km^{2} (4.64 sq mi)
- Elevation: 329 m (1,079 ft)

Population (31 August 2021)
  - Total: 2,039
  - Density: 169.6/km^{2} (439.3/sq mi)
- Demonym: Chiaveranesi
- Time zone: UTC+1 (CET)
  - Summer (DST): UTC+2 (CEST)
- Postal code: 10010
- Dialing code: 0125
- Website: Official website

Chiaverano is a comune (municipality) in the Metropolitan City of Turin in the Italian region Piedmont, located about 50 kilometres (31 mi) northeast of Turin.

Chiaverano borders the following municipalities: Donato, Andrate, Borgofranco d'Ivrea, Sala Biellese, Torrazzo, Montalto Dora, Burolo, Ivrea, and Cascinette d'Ivrea. Sights include the Romanesque church of Santo Stefano di Sessano (11th century) and the remains of San Giuseppe Castle.

Part of Lake Sirio lies within the boundaries of the comune.

== Twin towns ==
- Mane, France
