= Erbaluce di Caluso =

Italian white wine

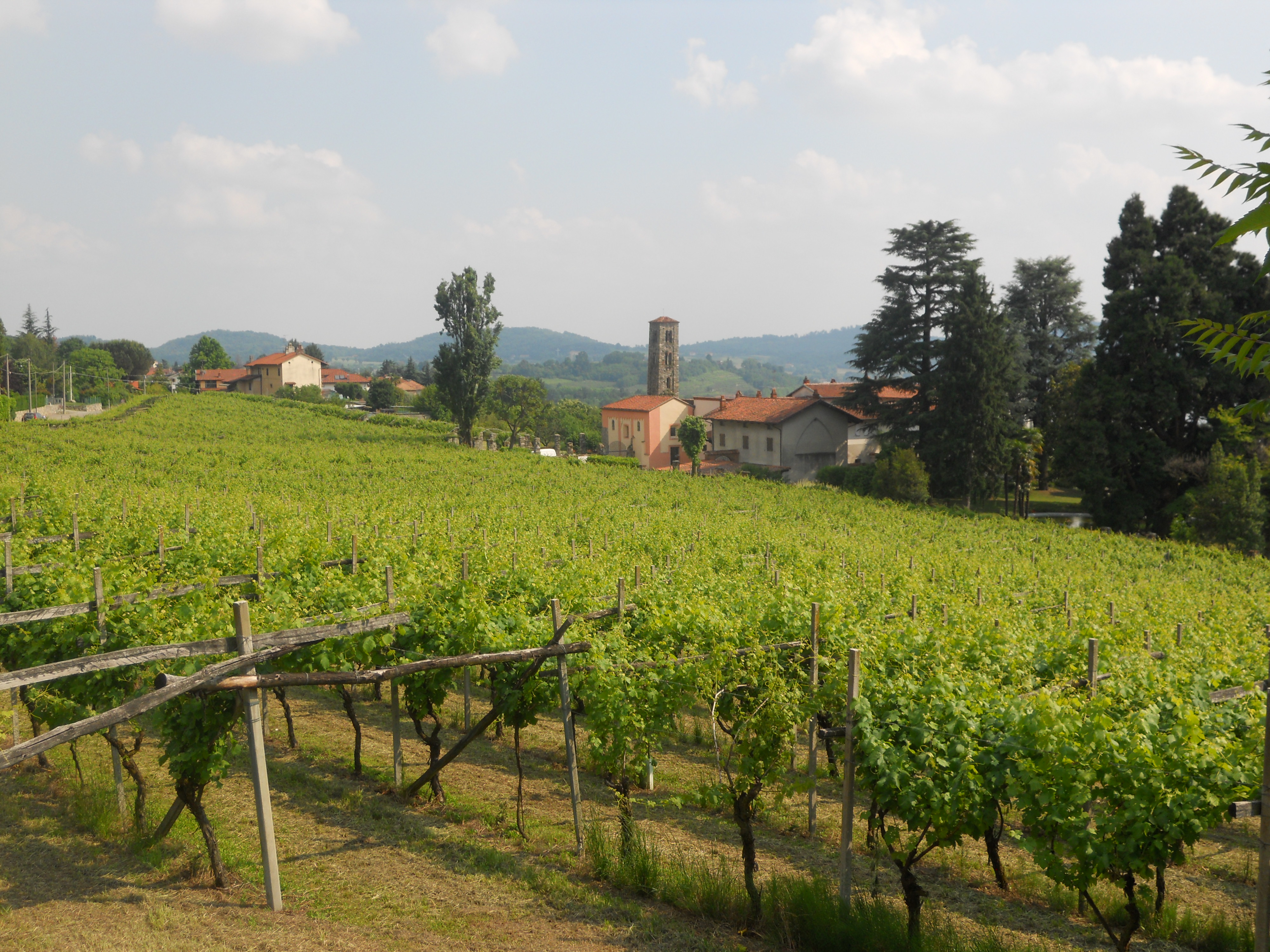
Erbaluce di Caluso vineyards in Viverone

Erbaluce di Caluso (Piedmontese: Erbalus ëd Caluso) is a white DOCG wine produced in the Piedmont region of northern Italy, in the Canavese area, on the hills surrounding the towns of Caluso and Ivrea.

It is made from the grapes of the eponymous Erbaluce variety, a white grape that has been cultivated in the area since ancient times and is regarded as one of Piedmont's most distinctive native white grapes. The designation permits several styles of wine: alongside the still version, a traditional-method sparkling wine known as Erbaluce di Caluso Spumante and a straw wine known as Erbaluce di Caluso Passito are also produced.

The grapes from which Erbaluce di Caluso is produced are traditionally trained using the Canavese pergola system, which remains common in historic vineyards. In newer vineyards, the Guyot system is increasingly used.

== History ==
The wine received DOC status in 1967. It was subsequently elevated to DOCG, Italy's highest wine classification, in 2010.

== Wine region ==
The wine is produced from grapes grown in the Canavese area of Piedmont, in northwestern Italy. The vineyards are mainly located on the morainic hills of the Ivrea Morainic Amphitheatre, formed by the ancient deposits of the Balteo Glacier and characterised by acidic, sandy, pebble-rich soils, a well-ventilated climate, and pronounced diurnal temperature variations. The main growing areas are concentrated around Caluso and its surrounding hills, extending to the areas around Lake Candia and Lake Viverone, as well as the villages of Settimo Rottaro, Piverone, Azeglio, Agliè, San Giorgio and Cuceglio.

Under the production regulations, the production area encompasses the territory of the following municipalities:

Agliè, Azeglio, Bairo, Barone, Bollengo, Borgomasino, Burolo, Caluso, Candia Canavese, Caravino, Cossano Canavese, Cuceglio, Ivrea, Maglione, Mazzè, Mercenasco, Montalenghe, Orio Canavese, Palazzo Canavese, Parella, Perosa Canavese, Piverone, Romano Canavese, San Giorgio Canavese, San Martino Canavese, Scarmagno, Settimo Rottaro, Strambino, Vestignè, Vialfrè, Villareggia and Vische, in the Province of Turin; Roppolo, Viverone and Zimone, in the Province of Biella; Moncrivello, in the Province of Vercelli.

== Types ==
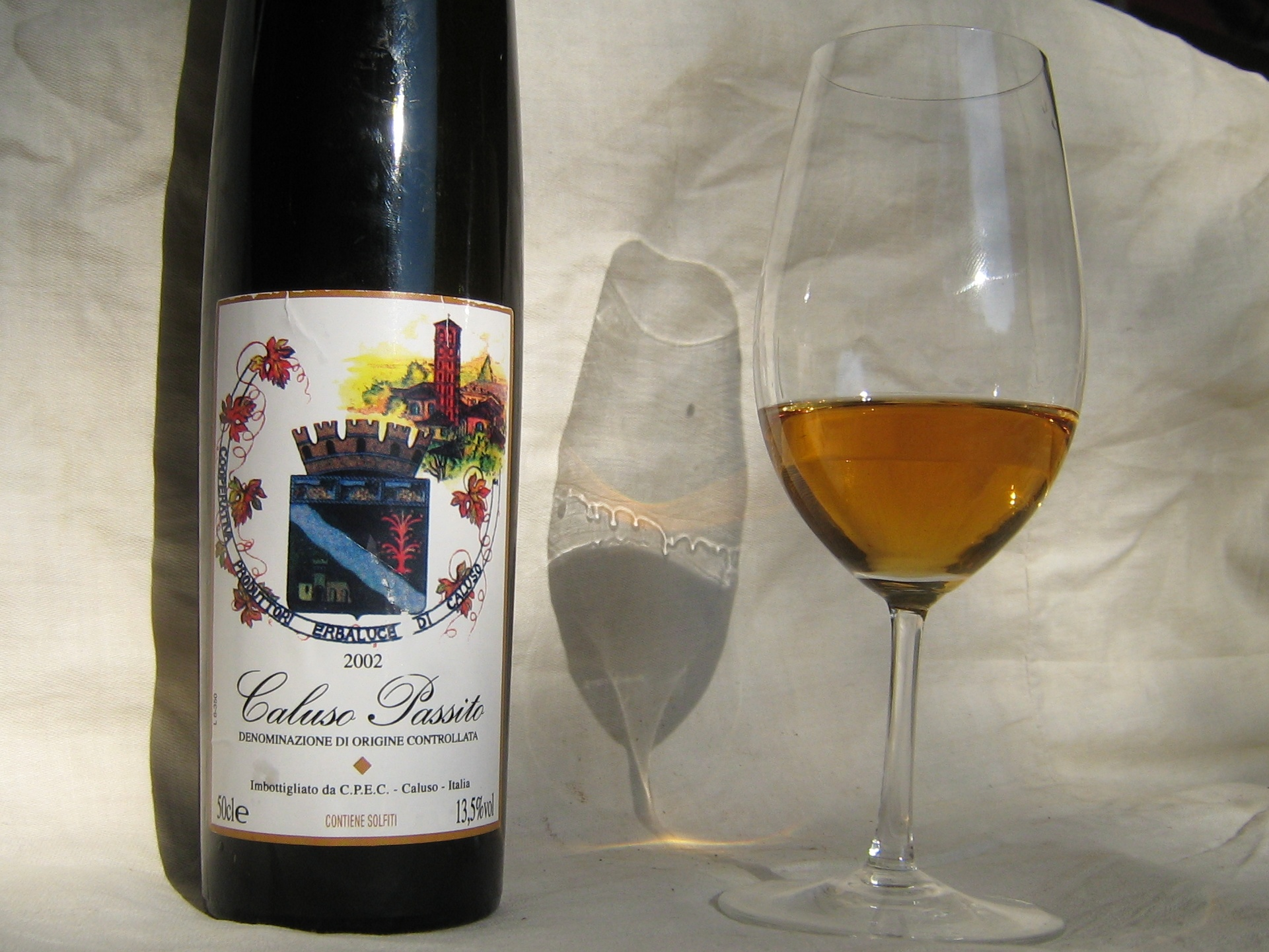
Caluso Passito

The designation comprises four types: Erbaluce di Caluso (or Caluso), Erbaluce di Caluso Spumante, Erbaluce di Caluso Passito, and Erbaluce di Caluso Passito Riserva. Under the production regulations, all four are made exclusively from Erbaluce grapes.

Erbaluce di Caluso is a still white wine, with a pale straw-yellow colour and a dry, fresh palate. Erbaluce di Caluso Spumante is made using the traditional method, with a secondary fermentation in bottle, and is characterized by a fine, persistent mousse; it must spend at least 15 months on its lees. Passito is made from air-dried grapes and ranges in colour from golden yellow to amber, with a sweet, harmonious and velvety palate; it must be aged for a minimum of 36 months. Passito Riserva requires a longer minimum ageing period of 48 months.

== See also ==
- Carema (wine)
