= Santi Pietro e Paolo, Bollengo =

Church in Piedmont, Italy

Santi Pietro e Paolo
- Chiesa dei Santi Pietro e Paolo (Italian); Cesa ëd San Pé e Pàul (Piedmontese)
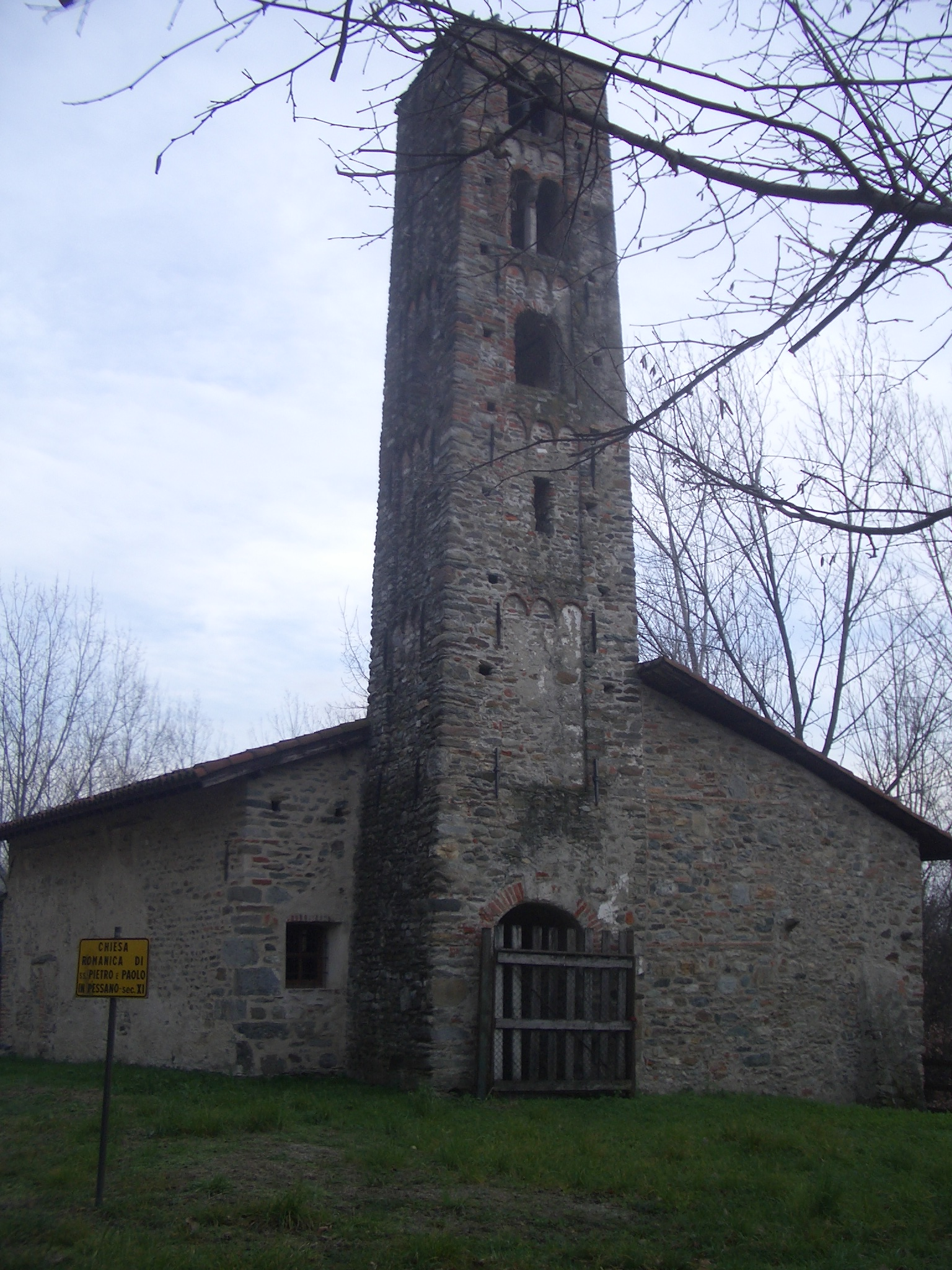
- Santi Pietro e Paolo, Bollengo in 2007
- Click on the map for a fullscreen view
- 45°28′15.6″N 7°57′19.6″E
- Country: Italy
- Denomination: Roman Catholic

Architecture
- Functional status: Active

Administration
- Diocese: Diocese of Ivrea

Santi Pietro e Paolo is a Roman Catholic church located in Bollengo, Piedmont, Italy.

== History ==
The church, built around the year 1000, stood in the village of Pessano. From 1250 onwards, however, both Pessano and nearby Paerno were depopulated in favor of the adjoining fortified settlement of Bollengo and were eventually abandoned altogether. The church survived as the sole remnant of the village of Pessano.

== Description ==
The church, situated at the foot of the Serra d'Ivrea, displays a Romanesque style and stands as a significant example of Romanesque architecture in the Canavese region.

The façade features a centrally positioned bell tower, following the so-called clocher-porche type. The six-storey bell tower is articulated into five vertical sections marked by Lombard bands.

The interior consists of a single apsed nave, divided into two bays by a large arch, with the walls preserving fragments of fifteenth-century frescoes.
