= Mazzè Castle =

- Castello di Mazzè
- Mazzè, Piedmont, Italy
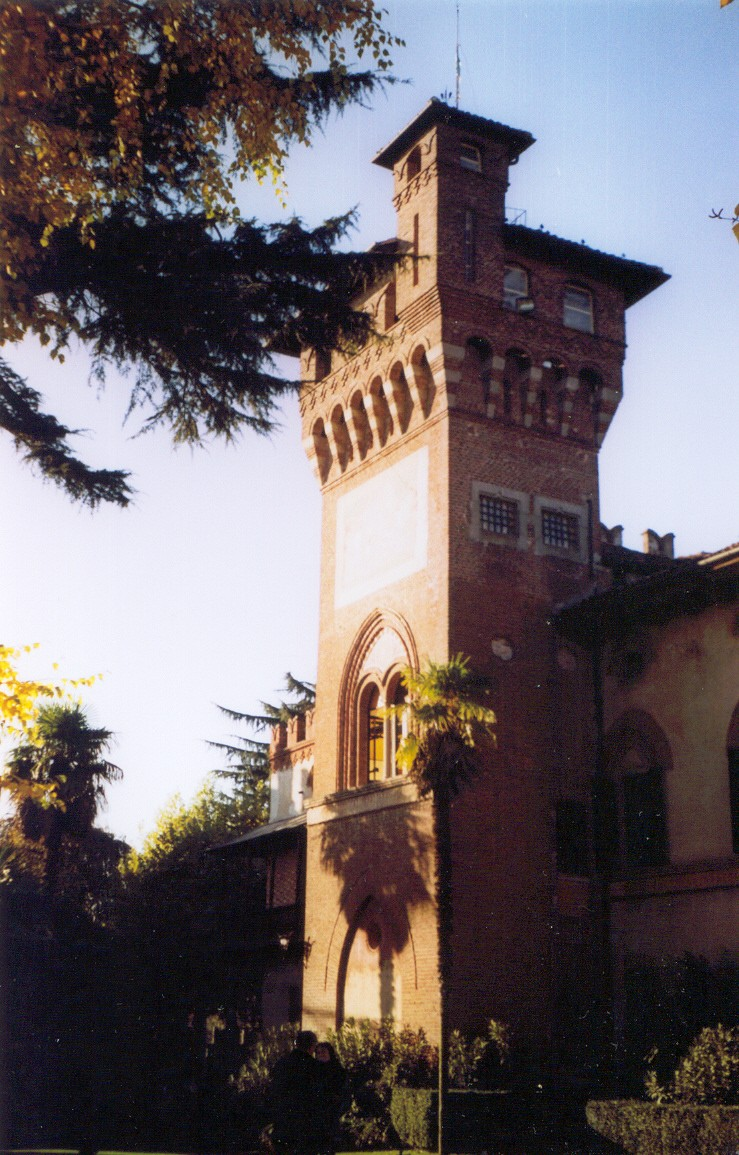
- Mazzè Castle

Site information
- Type: Castle

Location
- Location in Italy
- Coordinates: 45°18′19.15″N 7°56′20.89″E

Mazzè Castle (Italian: Castello di Mazzè) is a castle located in Mazzè, Piedmont, Italy.

== History ==
The castle belonged to the Valperga family for seven centuries, until its extinction in 1840. It was renovated and modified several times across the centuries. In particular, it is important to mention the renovation works performed under the direction of architect Velati Bellini in the 19th century, which gave the castle its current appearance.

== Gallery ==
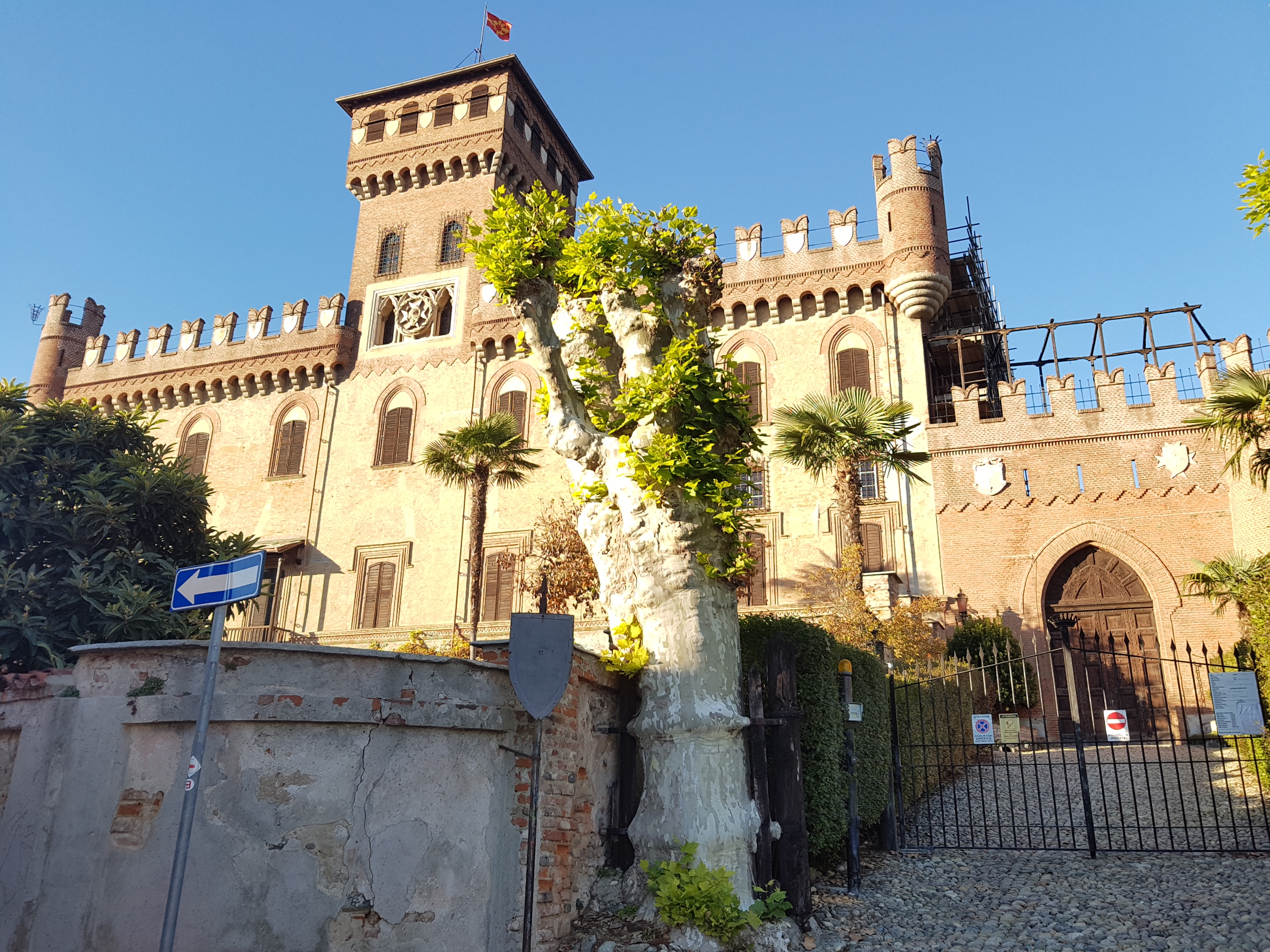

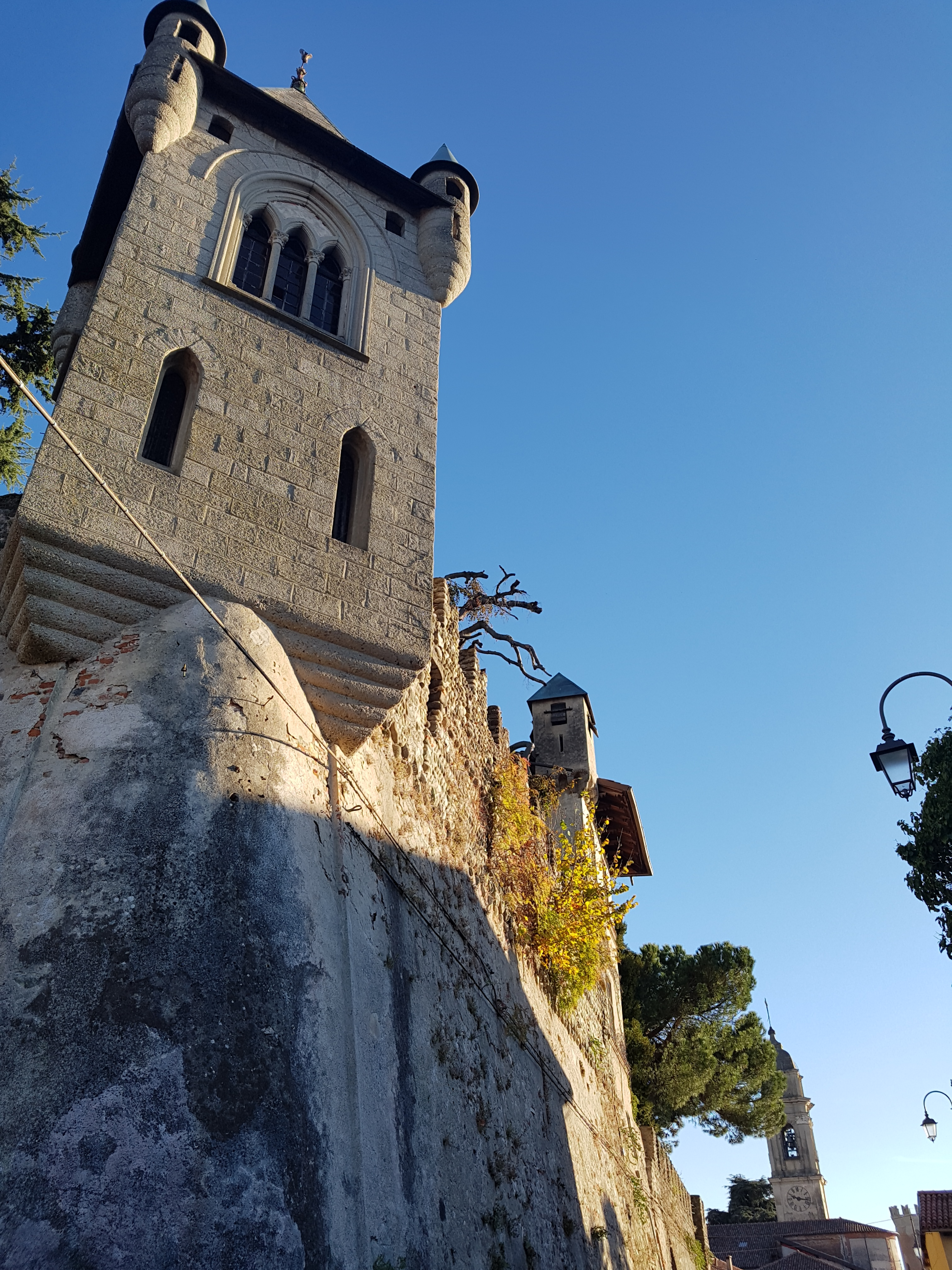

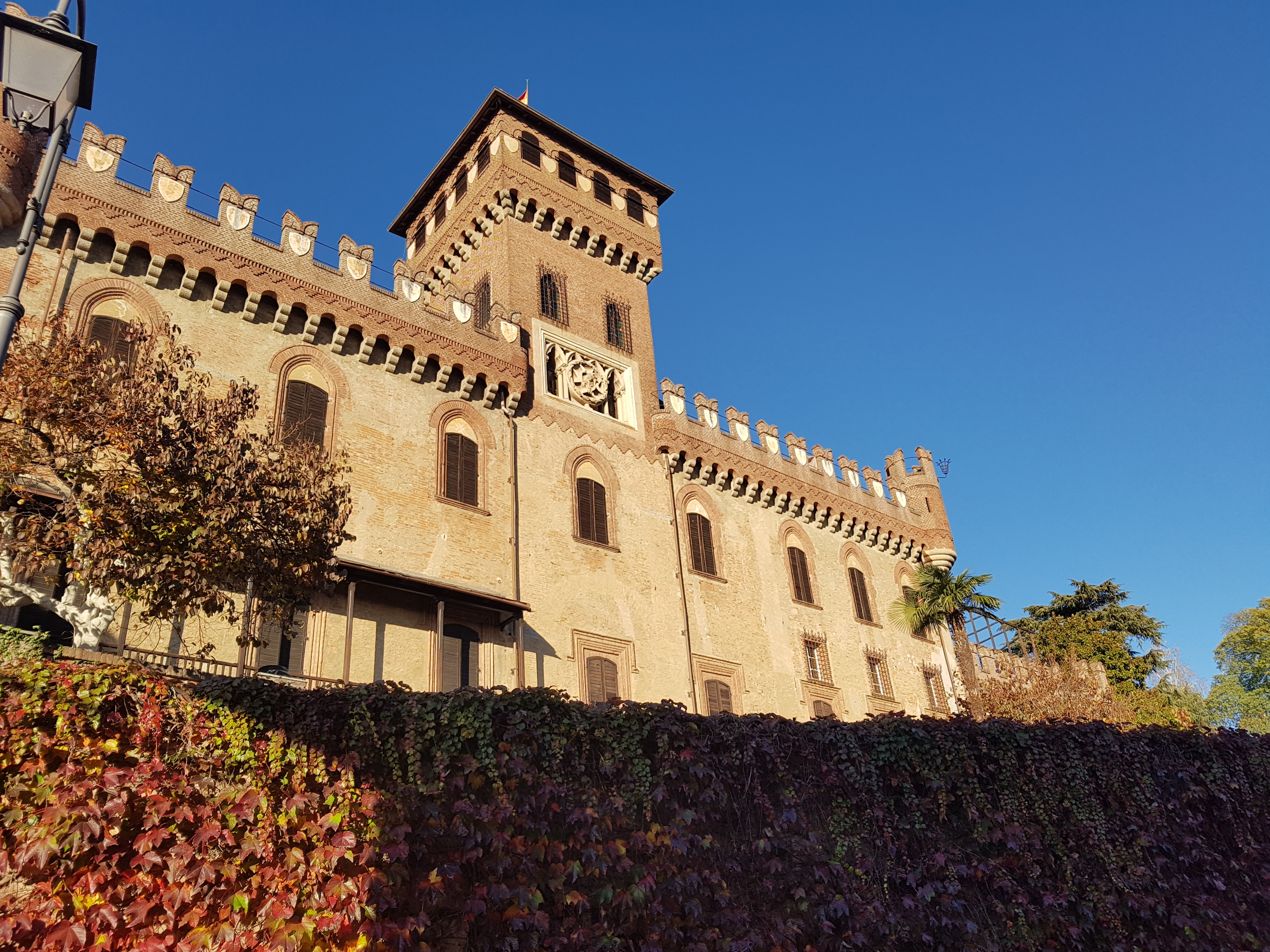
