= Castiglione Tower =

- Torre di Castiglione
- Candia Canavese, Piedmont, Italy
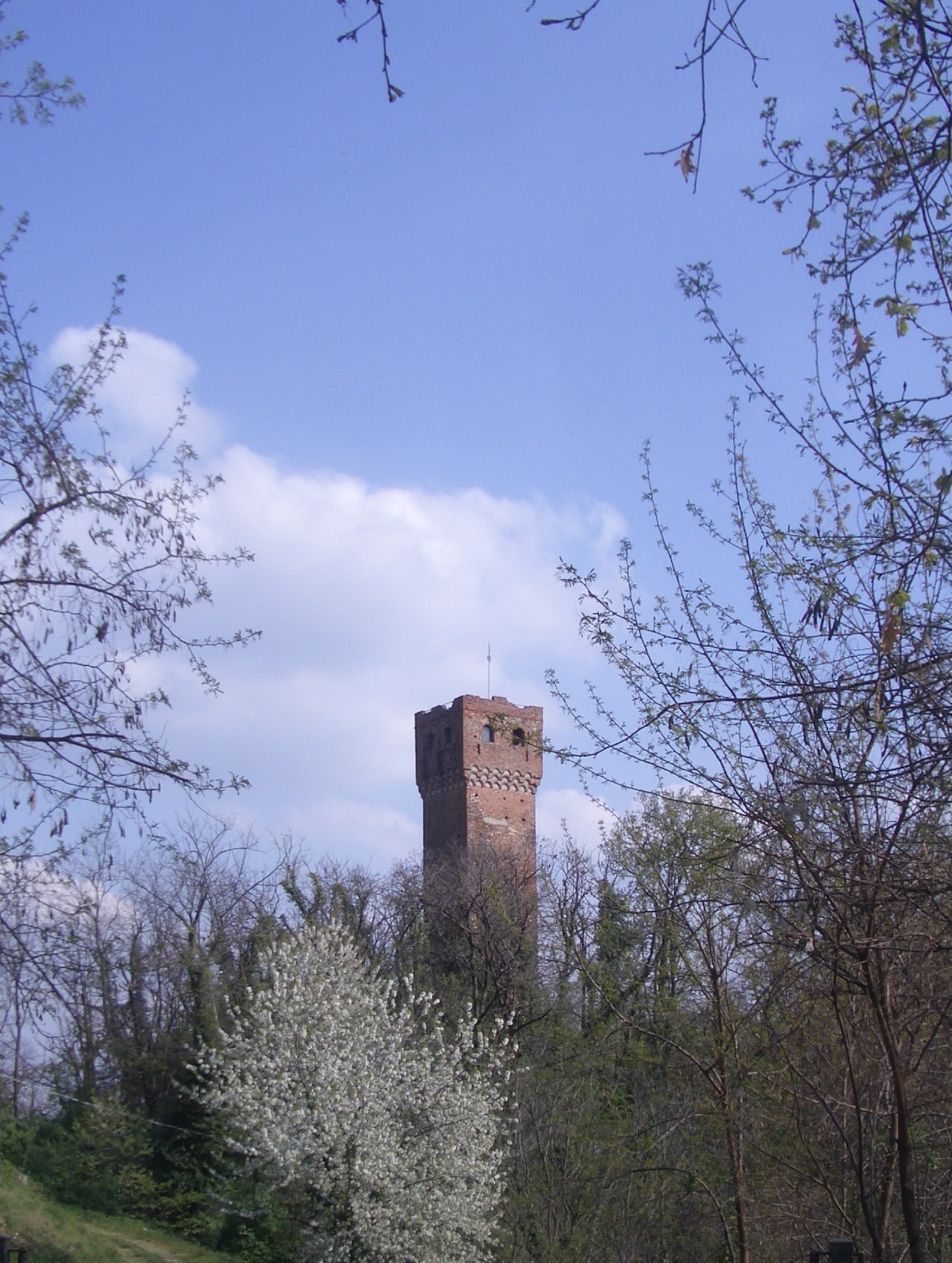
- Castiglione Tower in 2008

Site information
- Type: Tower

Location
- Location in Italy
- Coordinates: 45°19′46.68″N 7°52′56.39″E

Castiglione Tower (Italian: Torre di Castiglione) is a medieval tower located in Candia Canavese, Piedmont, Italy.

== History ==
The tower is all that remains of Castiglione Castle, built in the 11th century and disappeared along with the village of the same name towards the end of the 16th century.

The tower, currently owned by the Pachiè family, underwent some restoration work in the early 1970s.

== Description ==
The tower stands alone in the woods covering the hill of Santo Stefano, overlooking the village of Candia Canavese. The lower part of the structure is made of stone, while the upper part is built with bricks. The door into the tower is several meters above the ground.
