= Candia Canavese =

- Comune
- Comune di Candia Canavese
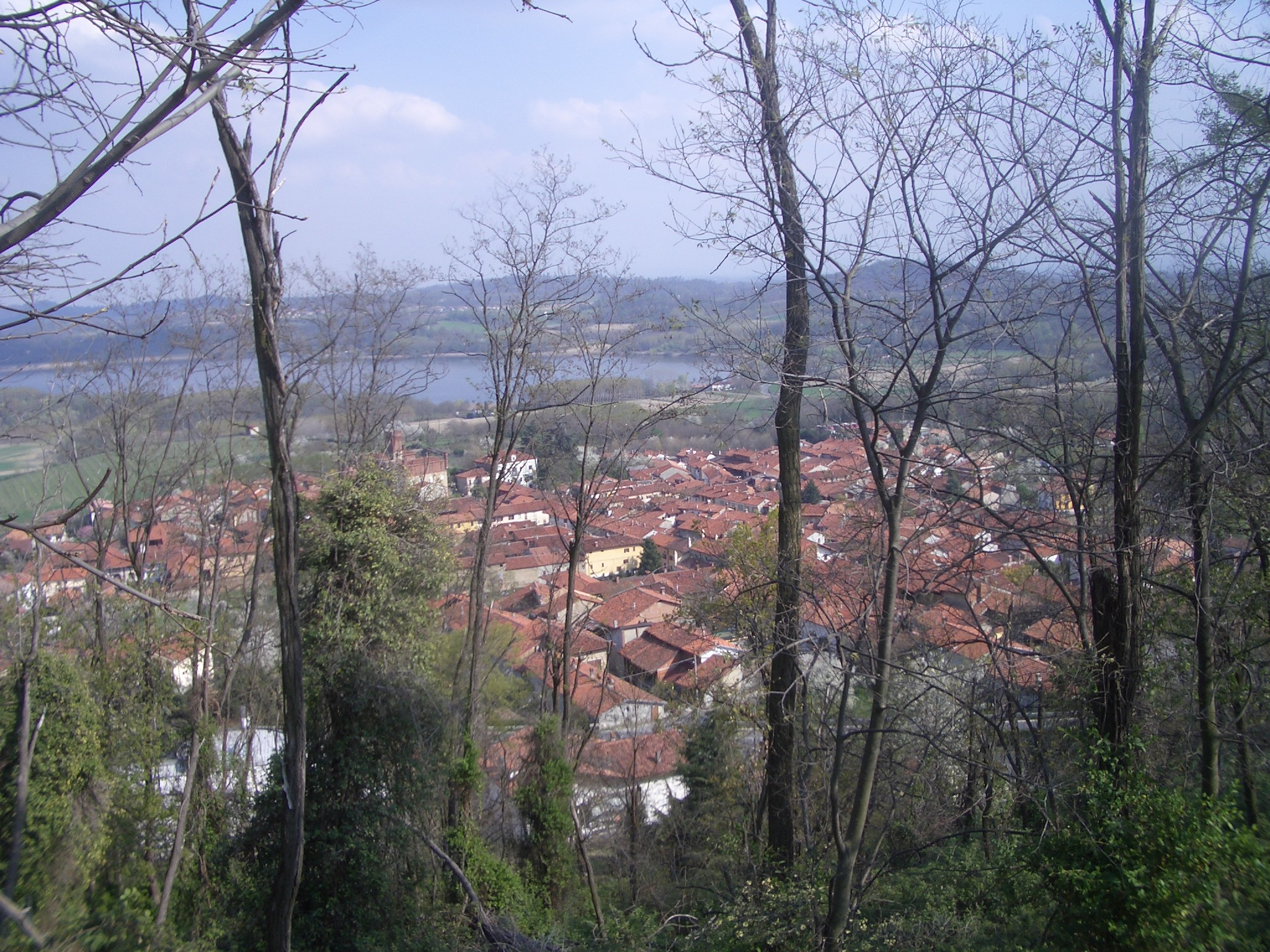

- Location within Italy Location within Piedmont
- Coordinates: 45°20′N 7°53′E
- Country: Italy
- Region: Piedmont
- Metropolitan city: Turin (TO)
- Frazioni: Margherita, Rossi, Bigoglio

Government
  - Mayor: Albertino Salzone

Area
  - Total: 9.13 km^{2} (3.53 sq mi)
- Elevation: 285 m (935 ft)

Population (30 April 2017)
  - Total: 1,263
  - Density: 138/km^{2} (358/sq mi)
- Demonym: Candiesi
- Time zone: UTC+1 (CET)
  - Summer (DST): UTC+2 (CEST)
- Postal code: 10010
- Dialing code: 011
- Patron saint: St. Michael
- Saint day: Last Sunday of September
- Website: Official website

Candia Canavese (in Piedmontese language: Cándia) is a comune of the Metropolitan City of Turin situated in the historical region of the Canavese in Piedmont, Italy about 35 kilometres (22 mi) northeast of Turin. It borders the following municipalities: Strambino, Mercenasco, Vische, Barone Canavese, Mazzè, and Caluso.

It is known for the wine Erbaluce di Caluso and for its lake, the Lago di Candia, which is protected as part of the Parco naturale del Lago di Candia nature reserve and also has a rowing club.

== Main sights ==
Various historic buildings found nearby include the eleventh-century church of Santo Stefano al Monte, which probably stands on the ruins of a pagan temple and the late Roman Pieve di San Michele. The 18th-century castle was built on the site of the ancient fortress that dominated the town until it was badly damaged in the 14th century, during the wars of the Canavese and finally dismantled by Fabrotino da Parma. Eventually a new castle was erected and it is known today as "Castelfiorito" di Candia Canavese. The ancient castle was held from 1204 to 1669 by the lords of Candia and Castiglione, first records of the construction of the castrum of Candia date back to the events of the Fourth Crusade and the investiture in 1205, by the Podestà of Ivrea, of the counts and feudal lords of Roero, the brothers Enrico, Guglielmo, and Giacomo de Candia and Castiglione. A thriving center of trade, the castle became the main possession of the de Candia family in the Canavese. The construction does not appear uniform: in some parts, it is made of exposed bricks, like the tower with Ghibelline battlements, which has a structure similar to the ancient tower of the Castiglione castle, related to Gotofredo da Castiglione.
