= Lago di Candia =

Lake in Metropolitan City of Turin, Piedmont, Italy

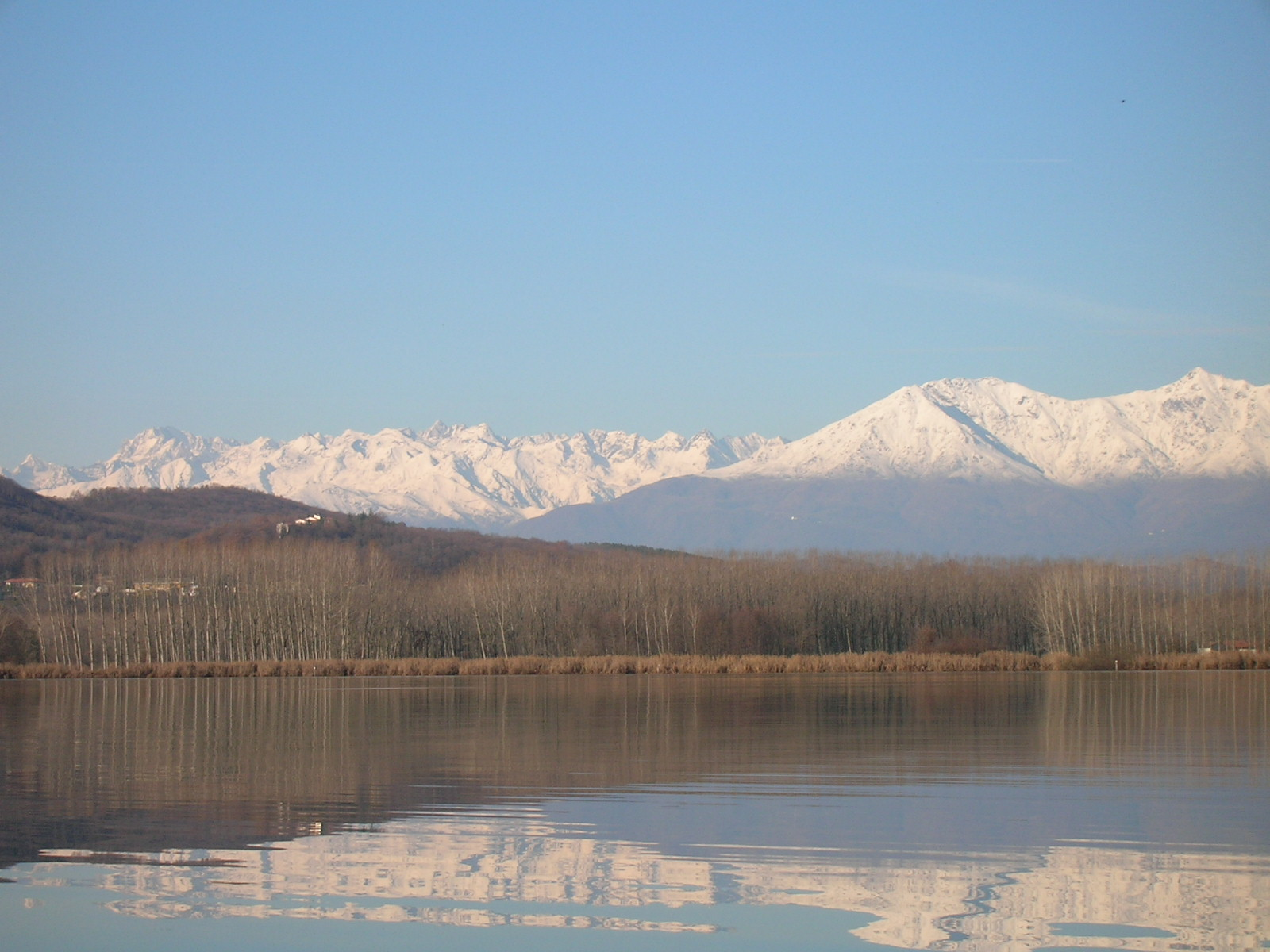

- Location within Piedmont
- Location: Province of Turin
- Coordinates: 45°20′N 7°53′E
- Type: Glacial
- Primary inflows: Underwater springs
- Basin countries: Italy
- Surface area: 1.52 km^{2} (0.59 sq mi)
- Average depth: 4.7 m (15 ft)
- Max. depth: 7.7 m (25 ft)
- Residence time: 6 or 7 years
- Shore length^{1}: 5.5 km (3.4 mi)
- Surface elevation: 226 m (741 ft)
- Settlements: Candia Canavese, Vische, and Mazzè
- ^{1} Shore length is not a well-defined measure.

The Lago di Candia is a small, shallow Italian lake of glacial origin, located by the town of Candia Canavese in the Piedmontese province of Turin. The lake forms the centre of an environmentally important wetland area which, as the Parco naturale del Lago di Candia, became a nature reserve in 1995.

== Gallery ==
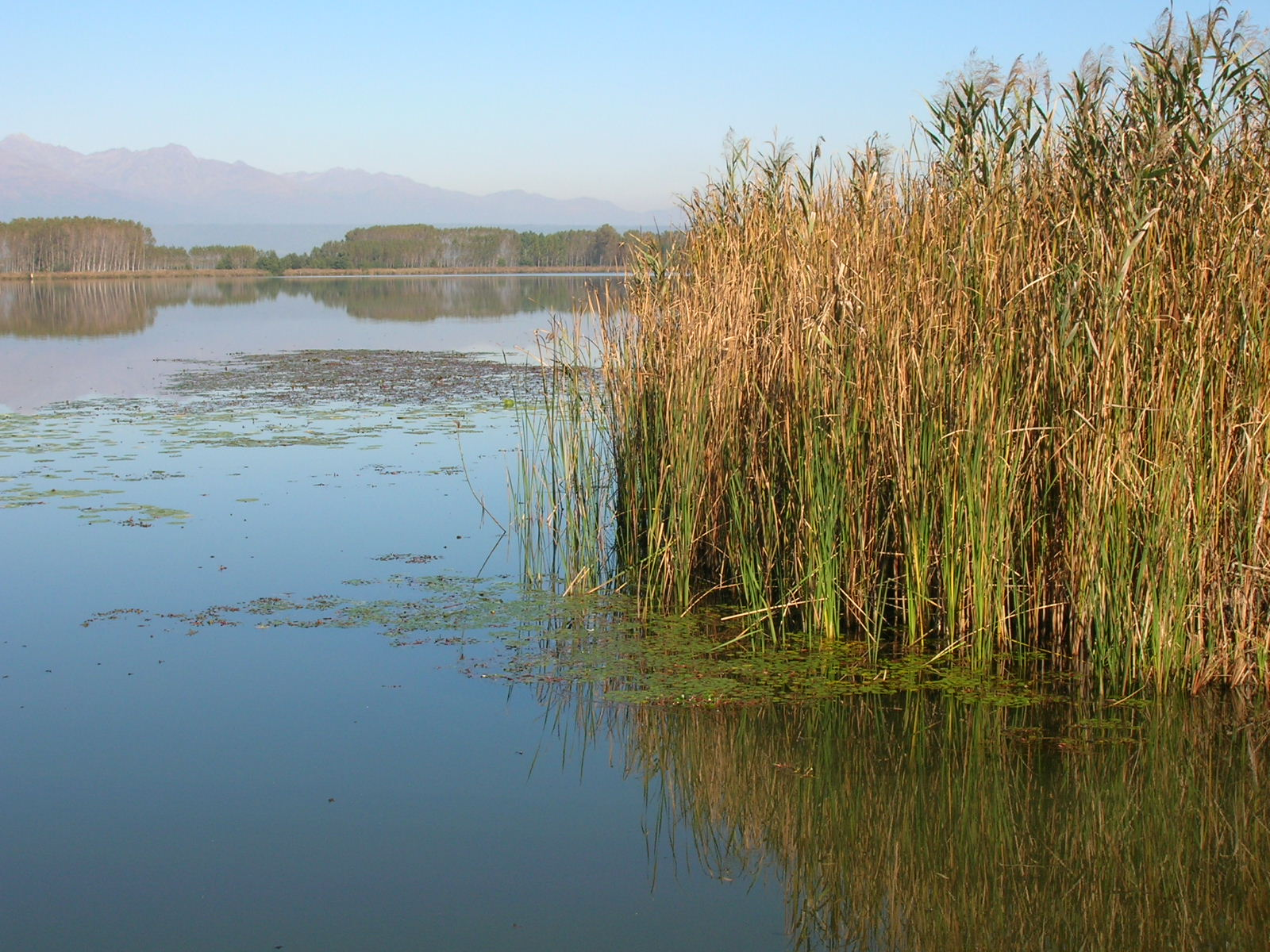
Cane thicket

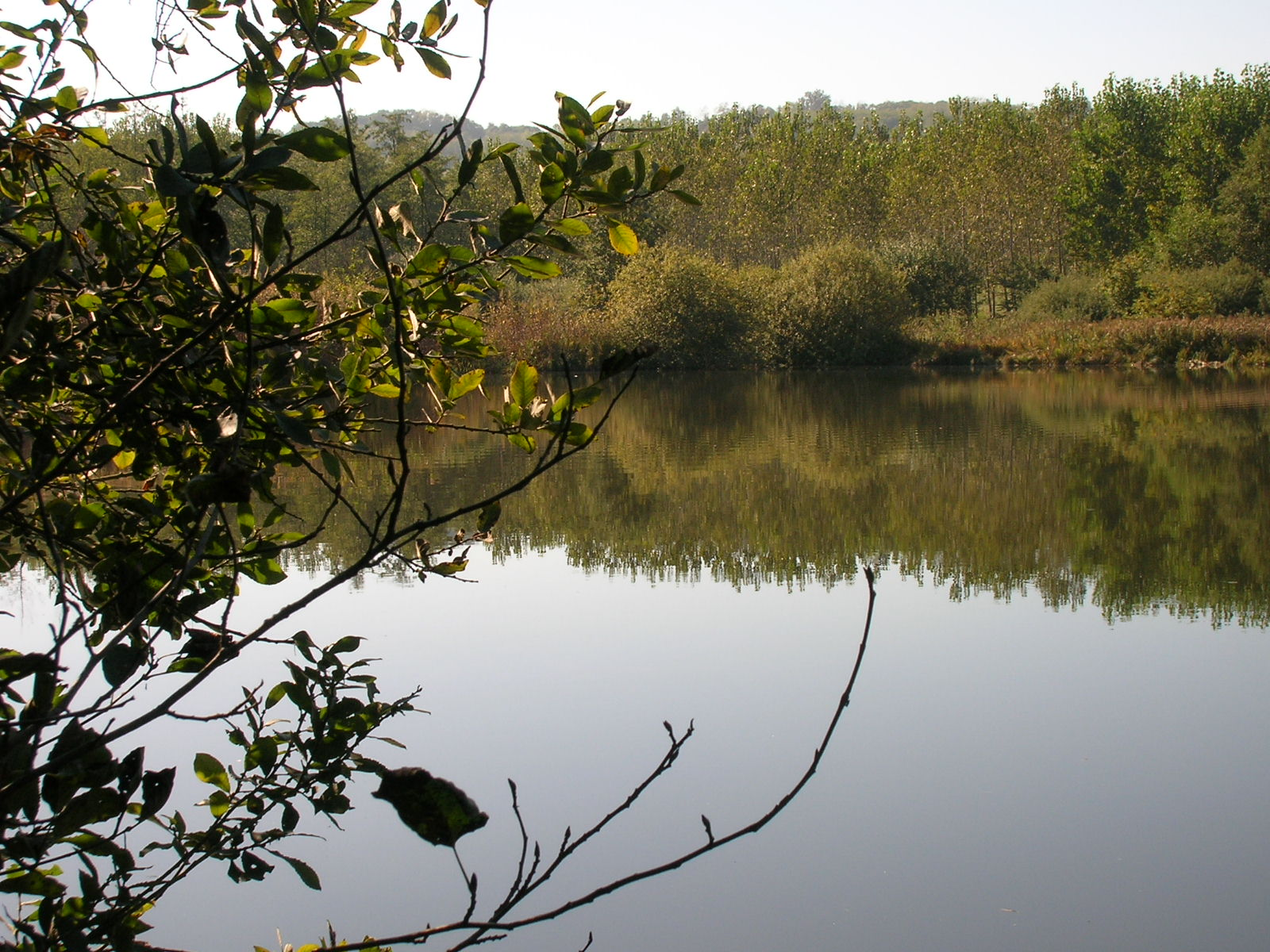
View of the lake and the wetlands

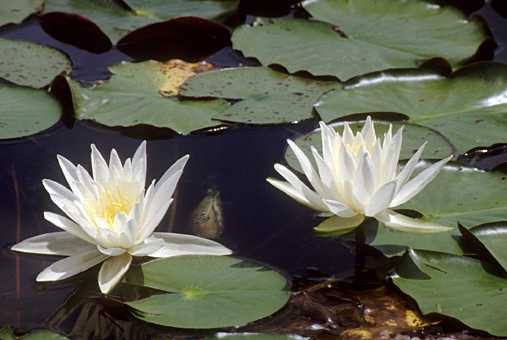
White waterlilies on the lake

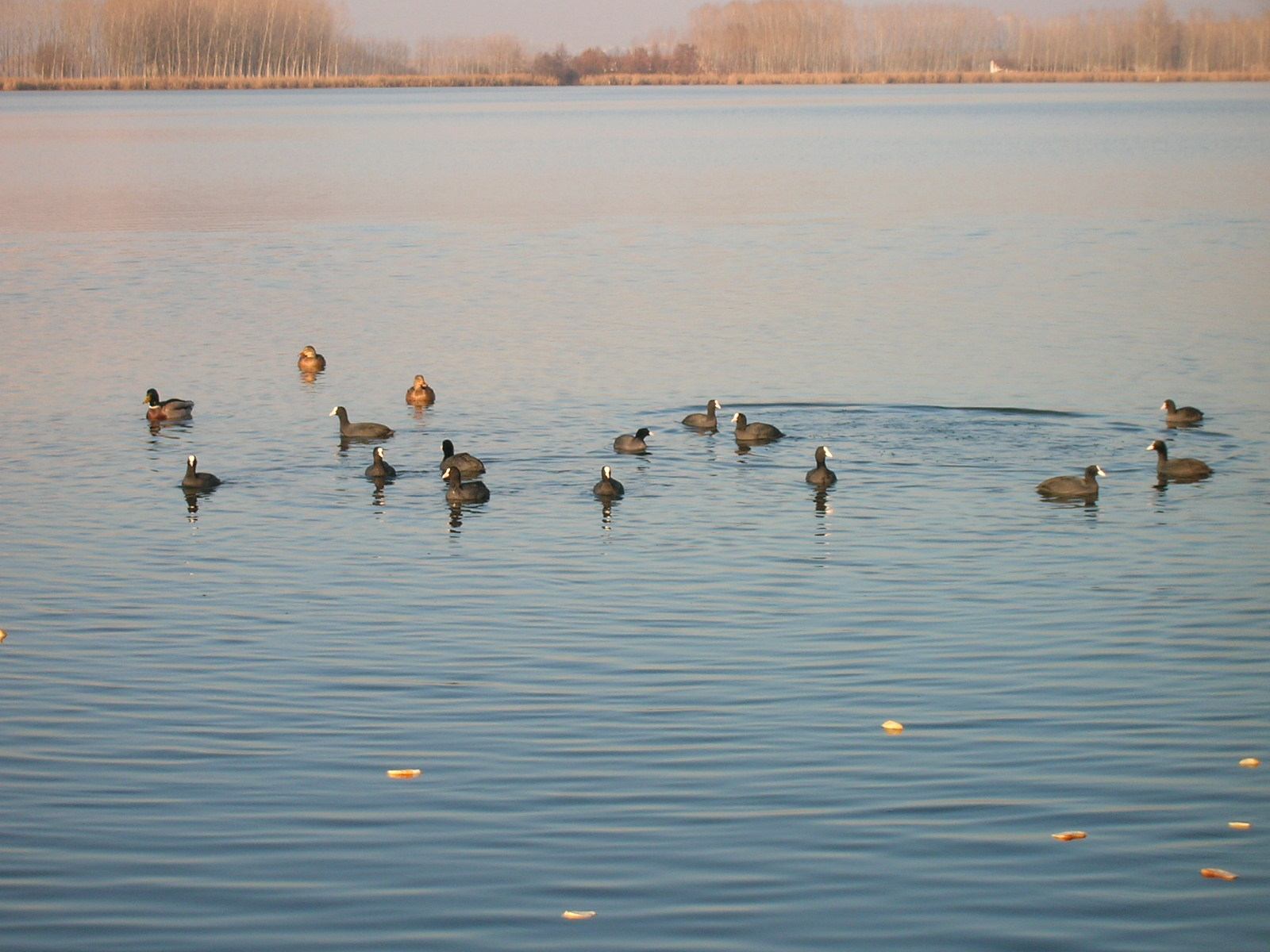
Coots
