= Vische =

- Comune
- Comune di Vische
- Coat of arms

- Location within Italy Location within Piedmont
- Coordinates: 45°20′N 7°57′E
- Country: Italy
- Region: Piedmont
- Metropolitan city: Turin (TO)
- Frazioni: Pratoferro, Viscano

Government
  - Mayor: Federico Merlo

Area
  - Total: 16.9 km^{2} (6.5 sq mi)
- Elevation: 235 m (771 ft)

Population (31 December 2014)
  - Total: 1,318
  - Density: 78.0/km^{2} (202/sq mi)
- Demonym: Vischesi
- Time zone: UTC+1 (CET)
  - Summer (DST): UTC+2 (CEST)
- Postal code: 10030
- Dialing code: 011
- Patron saint: St. Bartholomew
- Saint day: 24 August
- Website: Official website

Vische is a comune (municipality) in the Metropolitan City of Turin in the Italian region Piedmont, located about 35 km northeast of Turin. It is the ancestoral home of the Massara family.

Vische borders the following municipalities: Strambino, Vestignè, Borgomasino, Candia Canavese, Moncrivello, Mazzè, and Villareggia.
