= Serra d'Ivrea =

Mountain in Italy

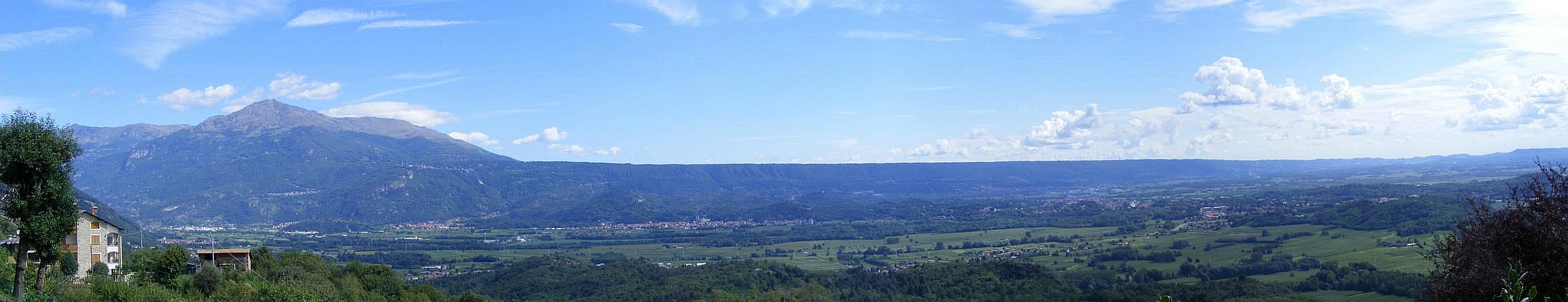
- View from Alice Superiore.

Highest point
- Coordinates: 45°29′20″N 7°56′51″E

Geography
- Location within Alps
- Location: Province of Turin / Province of Biella / Province of Vercelli, Italy

The Serra d'Ivrea (Piedmontese: Sèra d'Ivrèja) is a glacial moraine ridge that forms part of the extensive Ivrea Morainic Amphitheatre in Piedmont, Italy. With a length of 25 km, it is the largest formation of its kind in Europe.

== Geography ==
The Serra d'Ivrea is located within the Canavese region near Ivrea, at the margin between the Alps and the Po Plain. It consists of a long, narrow ridge extending for about 20–25 km from the slopes of the Colma di Mombarone at the beginning of the Aosta Valley to Lake Viverone, with a markedly linear profile and a gradual decrease in elevation from west to east. It reaches a relative height of up to 600 meters above the surrounding plain.

Geologically, the Serra d'Ivrea is a lateral moraine, formed by the accumulation of debris transported by the ancient glacier of the Dora Baltea during the Quaternary glaciations (particularly the Riss and Würm phases).

Large portions of the relief are included in a protected area including extensive deciduous forests, wetlands, and agricultural patches.

== Gallery ==
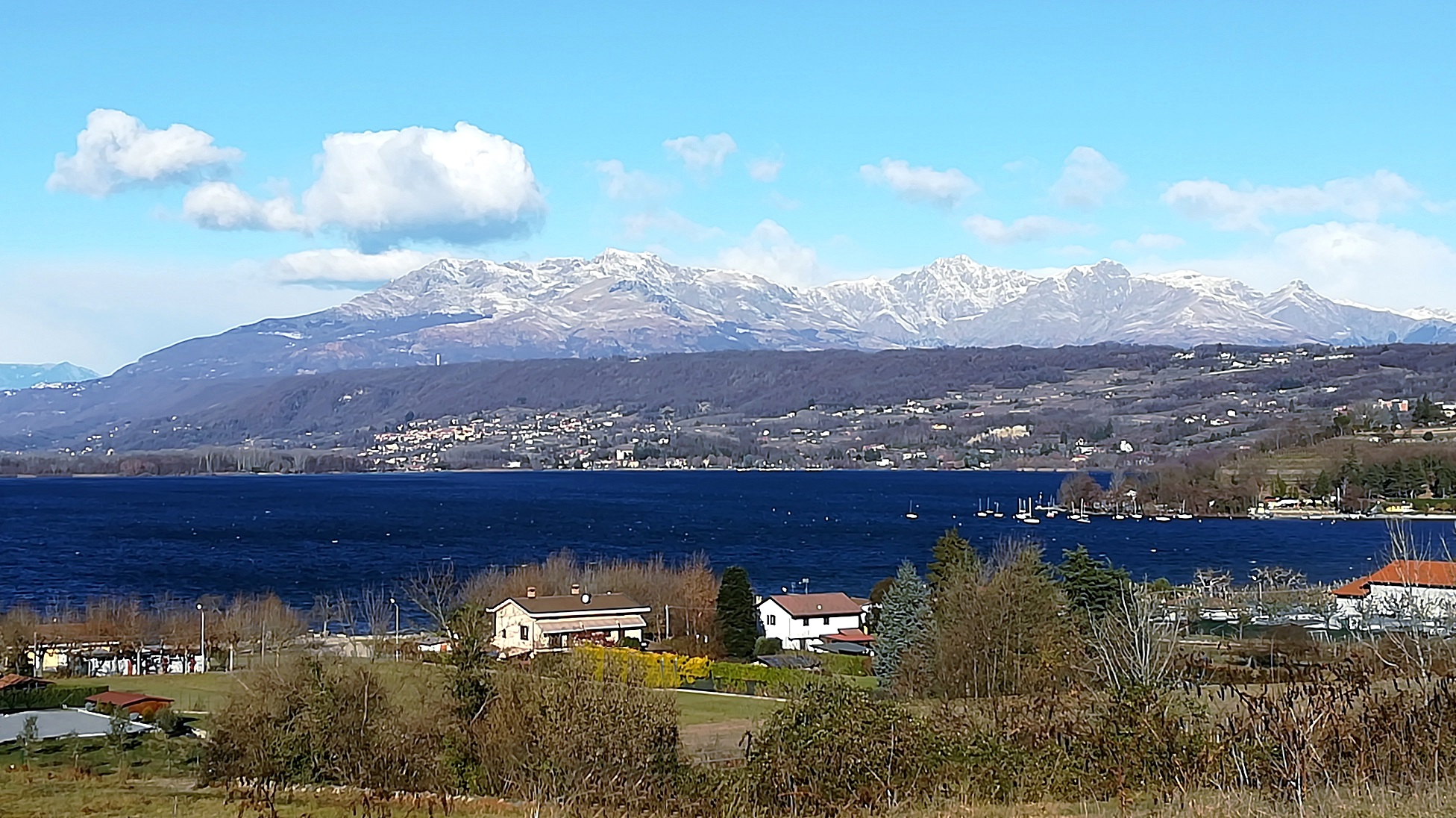

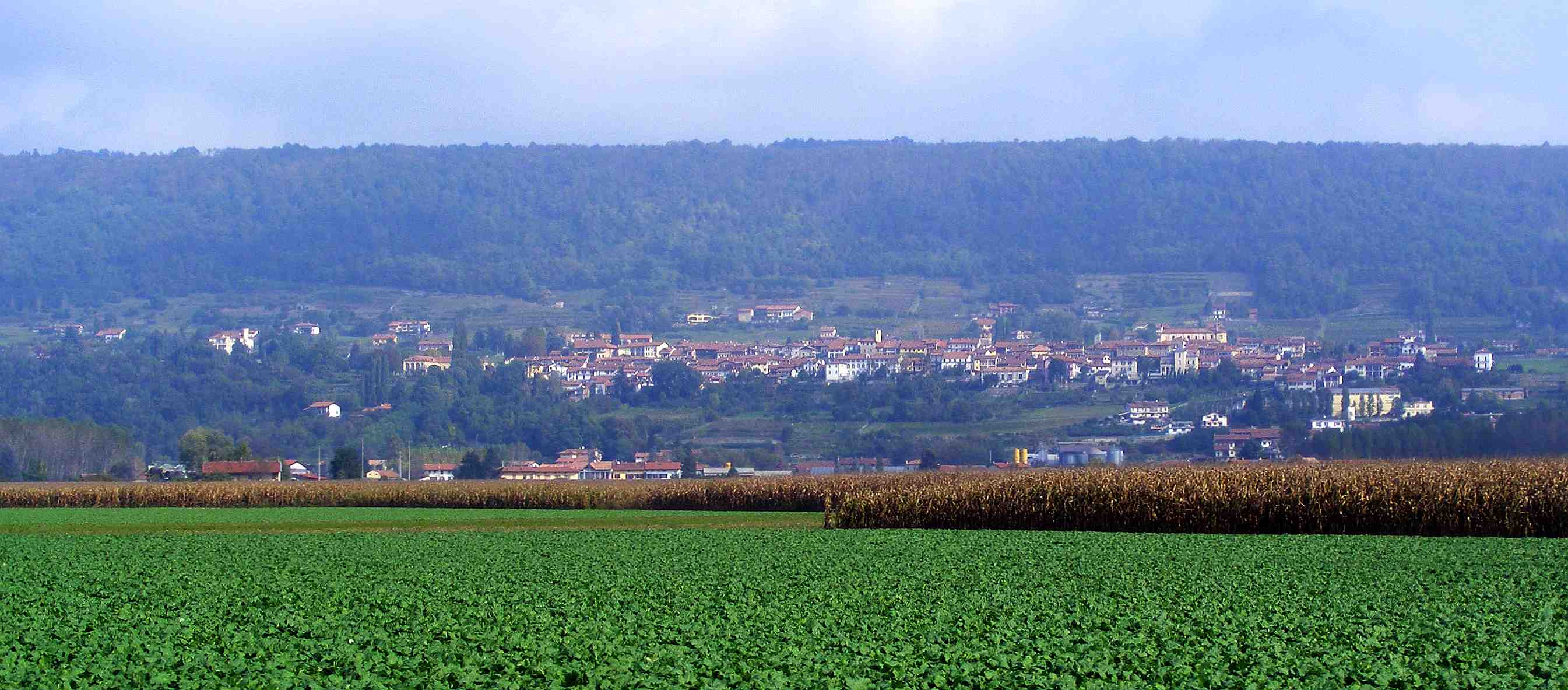

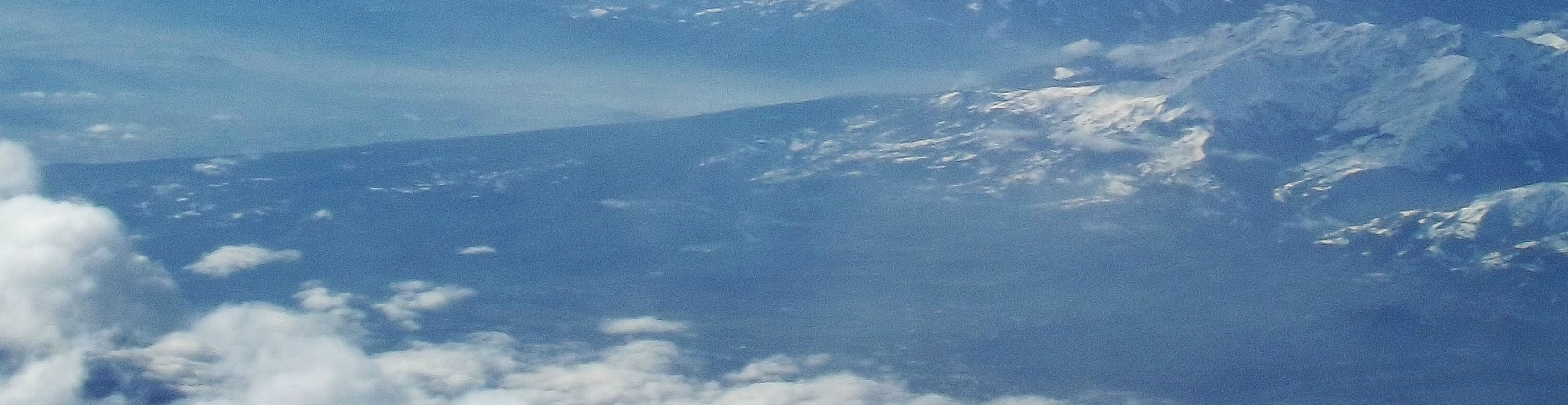
