= Pietro Azario =

Fourteenth-century Milanese notary

- Born: 1312; Novara
- Died: after 1367 unknown
- Occupation: notary

Pietro Azario (1312 – after 1367) was a Milanese notary. He is remembered for his Liber Gestorum in Lombardia, a history of northern Italy – principally Milan under the Visconti family – from 1250 to about 1364.

== Life ==
Azario was born to Giacomo Azario and Donina degli Alzalendina in 1312 in Novara, which at that time was in the Lordship of Milan. Nothing is known of his early life or his study of law, but that he became a notary. By 1347, he was in Borgomanero in the service of the Visconti family; he continued to serve them for most of his life.

From about 1362 he was in Tortona as chancellor to the podestà, Giovanni del Pirovano. There he wrote his Liber Gestorum in Lombardia, a history of northern Italy in general, and of Milan and the Visconti dynasty in particular, from 1250 to 1362; he later added material covering 1363 and 1364. The autograph manuscript has not been identified, but a manuscript copy in Biblioteca Ambrosiana of Milan is believed to be accurate; it also contains another short work, the De statu Canapicii liber.

Neither the place nor the date of his death is known; it could not have been before 1367, as he makes reference to the marriage of an illegitimate daughter of Bernabò Visconti, Bernarda, to Giovanni di Baldino Suardi; that wedding took place on 16 January 1367, but was contracted in 1366.
