= Caluso =

- Comune
- Comune di Caluso
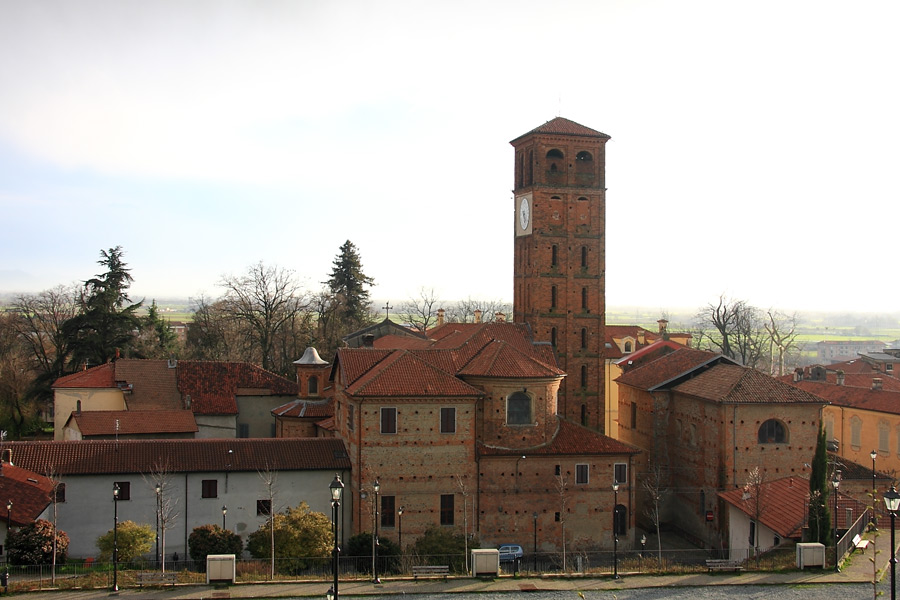

- Location within Italy Location within Piedmont
- Coordinates: 45°18′N 7°53′E
- Country: Italy
- Region: Piedmont
- Metropolitan city: Turin (TO)
- Frazioni: Arè, Carolina, Molliette, Rodallo, Vallo

Government
  - Mayor: Maria Rosa Cena

Area
  - Total: 39.49 km^{2} (15.25 sq mi)
- Elevation: 303 m (994 ft)

Population (1-1-2017)
  - Total: 7,492
  - Density: 189.7/km^{2} (491.4/sq mi)
- Demonym: Calusiese(i)
- Time zone: UTC+1 (CET)
  - Summer (DST): UTC+2 (CEST)
- Postal code: 10014
- Dialing code: 011
- Website: Official website

Caluso is a comune (municipality) in the Metropolitan City of Turin in the Italian region Piedmont, located about 30 kilometres (19 mi) northeast of Turin.

Caluso borders the following municipalities: San Giorgio Canavese, Candia Canavese, Barone Canavese, Mazzè, Foglizzo, Montanaro, and Chivasso.

The peculiar geographical position and the particular climate of the area favor the production of white wines, most notably the "Erbaluce di Caluso" and the "Caluso Passito". The town is the seat of the Enoteca Regionale dei Vini della Provincia di Torino (Regional Wine Cellar of the Province of Turin) and of the State Professional Institute for Agriculture and the Environment "Carlo Ubertini".

== Twin towns – sister cities ==
Caluso is twinned with:

- Brissac-Quincé, France
