= Mazzè =

- Comune
- Comune di Mazzè
- Location within Italy Location within Piedmont
- Coordinates: 45°18′N 7°56′E
- Country: Italy
- Region: Piedmont
- Metropolitan city: Turin (TO)

Government
  - Mayor: Marco Formia

Area
  - Total: 27.8 km^{2} (10.7 sq mi)
- Elevation: 323 m (1,060 ft)

Population (31 October 2017)
  - Total: 4,146
  - Density: 149/km^{2} (386/sq mi)
- Demonym: Mazzediesi
- Time zone: UTC+1 (CET)
  - Summer (DST): UTC+2 (CEST)
- Postal code: 10035
- Dialing code: 011
- Website: Official website

Mazzè is a comune (municipality) in the Province of Turin in the Italian region Piedmont, located about 30 kilometres (19 mi) northeast of Turin.

Mazzè borders the following municipalities: Vische, Candia Canavese, Moncrivello, Caluso, Cigliano, Villareggia, Rondissone, and Chivasso.
