= Villareggia =

- Comune
- Comune di Villareggia
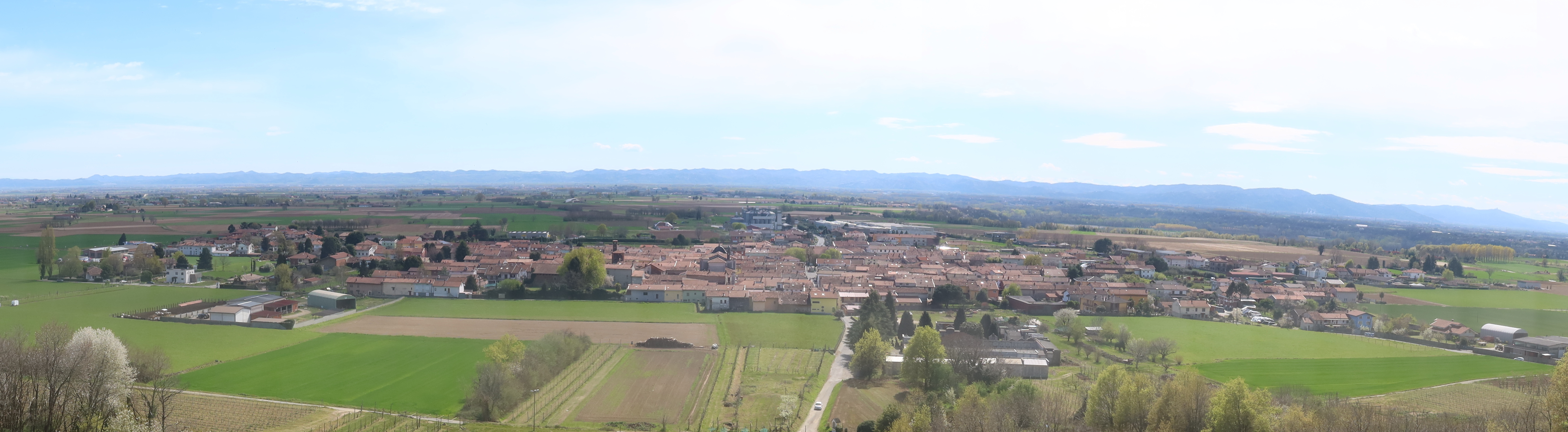

- Location within Italy Location within Piedmont
- Coordinates: 45°19′N 7°59′E
- Country: Italy
- Region: Piedmont
- Metropolitan city: Turin (TO)
- Frazioni: Gerbido, Rocca

Government
  - Mayor: Fabrizio Salono

Area
  - Total: 11.41 km^{2} (4.41 sq mi)
- Elevation: 274 m (899 ft)

Population (31 December 2010)
  - Total: 1,015
  - Density: 88.96/km^{2} (230.4/sq mi)
- Demonym: Villareggesi
- Time zone: UTC+1 (CET)
  - Summer (DST): UTC+2 (CEST)
- Postal code: 10030
- Dialing code: 0161
- Patron saint: St. Martin
- Saint day: 11 November
- Website: Official website

Villareggia is a comune (municipality) in the Metropolitan City of Turin in the Italian region Piedmont, located about 35 km northeast of Turin.
