= Cleopatra's Daughter =

Cleopatra's Daughter may refer to:

- Cleopatra Selene II, daughter of Cleopatra of Egypt
- Cleopatra's Daughter (film), a 1960 Italian film
- Cleopatra's Daughter (novel), a 2010 historical fiction novel by Michelle Moran
- Cleopatra's Daughter (Roller book), a 2018 nonfiction book Duane W. Roller
- Cleopatra's Daughter (Draycott book), a 2023 nonfiction book by Jane Draycott
