= Corbilo =

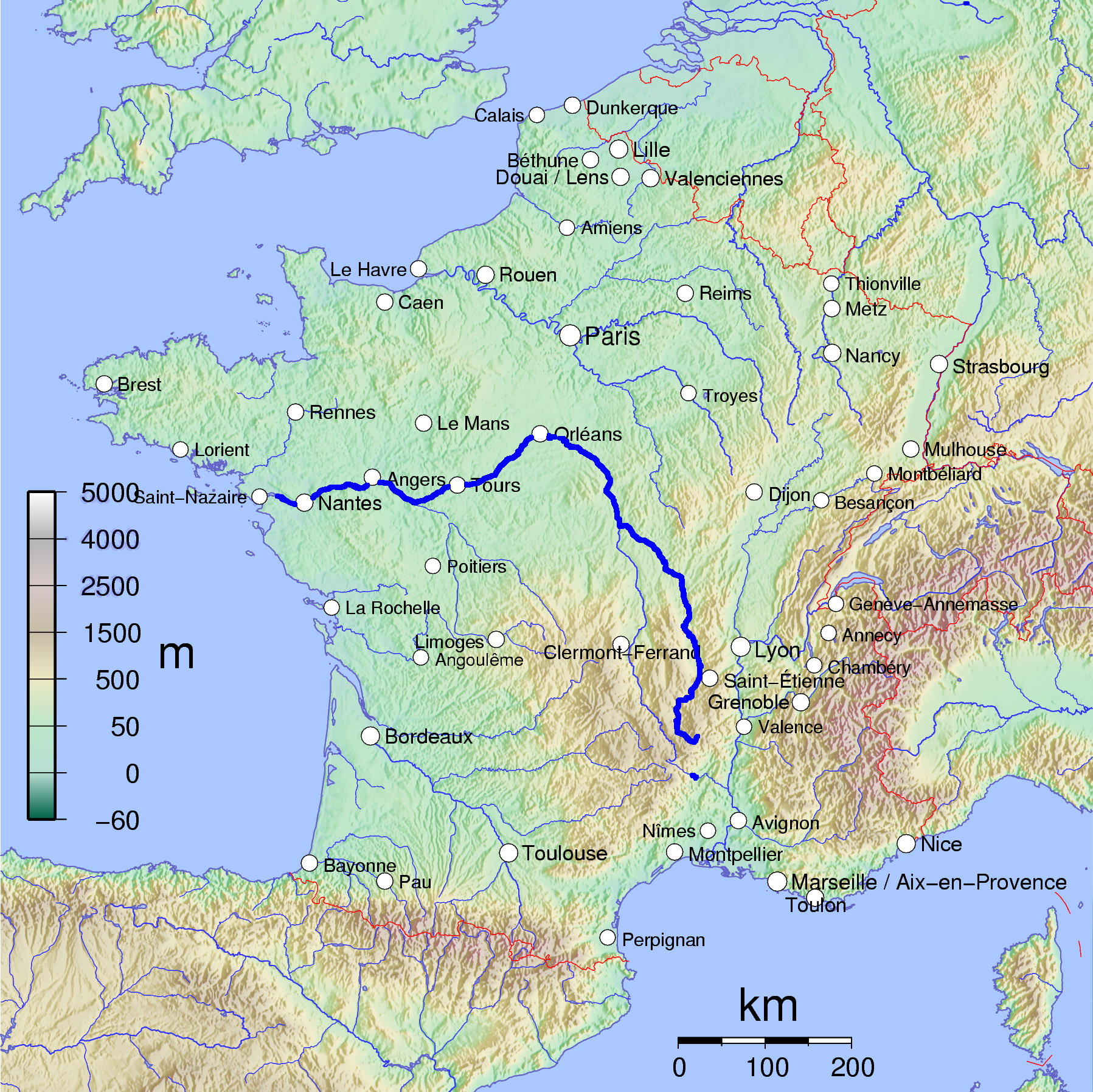
The course of the Loire river, upon which Corbilo was situated.

Corbilo (Ancient Greek: Κορβιλὼν, romanized: Korbilon) was a trading city on the Loire river described by Polybius and Pytheas. Neither original sources have survived, but Pytheas is quoted by Polybius, who is in turn quoted by Strabo.

== Quote ==
Strabo's (Geographia 4.2.2) is the only surviving text from antiquity to mention the city.

In the original ancient Greek:

"πρότερον δὲ Κορβιλὼν ὑπῆρχεν ἐμπόριον ἐπὶ τούτωι τῶι ποταμῶι͵ περὶ ἧς εἴρηκε Πολύβιος͵ μνησθεὶς τῶν ὑπὸ Πυθέου μυθολογηθέντων͵ ὅτι Μασσαλιωτῶν μὲν τῶν συμμιξάντων Σκιπίωνι οὐδεὶς εἶχε λέγειν οὐδὲν μνήμης ἄξιον ἐρωτηθεὶς ὑπὸ τοῦ Σκιπίωνος περὶ τῆς Βρεττανικῆς͵ οὐδὲ τῶν ἐκ Νάρβωνος οὐδὲ τῶν ἐκ Κορβιλῶνος͵ αἵπερ ἦσαν ἄρισται πόλεις τῶν ταύτηι͵ Πυθέας δ᾽ ἐθάρρησε τοσαῦτα ψεύσασθαι."

English translation by Jones (1923):

"Formerly there was an emporium on this river [the Loire], called Corbilo, with respect to which Polybius, calling to mind the fabulous stories of Pytheas, has said: 'Although no one of all the Massiliotes who conversed with Scipio was able, when questioned by Scipio about Britain, to tell anything worth recording, nor yet any one of the people from Narbo or of those from Corbilo, though these were the best of all the cities in that country, still Pytheas had the hardihood to tell all those falsehoods about Britain.'”

== Location ==
Strabo gives no further details about the location of Corbilo besides that it was "ἐμπόριον ἐπὶ τούτωι τῶι ποταμῶι": an emporium formerly (e.g. in Strabo's time; 1st century BC - 1st century AD) on the river Loire. Assuming it to be near the mouth of the Loire in the region of Saint-Nazaire, Couëron and Corsept have been suggested based on toponymic similarity.

Polybius states that together with Narbo and Massalia, Corbilo was amongst the "best of all the cities" in the Greek colonies of Gaul. By Strabo's time, approximately a century and a half later, Corbilo had been abandoned or destroyed. It is implied that Polybius either visited the city in person, or was able to gather intelligence from people who did; likewise it is implied that Pytheas visited it during his voyages.

== See also ==
- Strabo's Geographica
- Ictis
- Greek colonisation
