= Corsept =

Corsept Corsèt (Gallo) Corzed (Breton)
- Commune
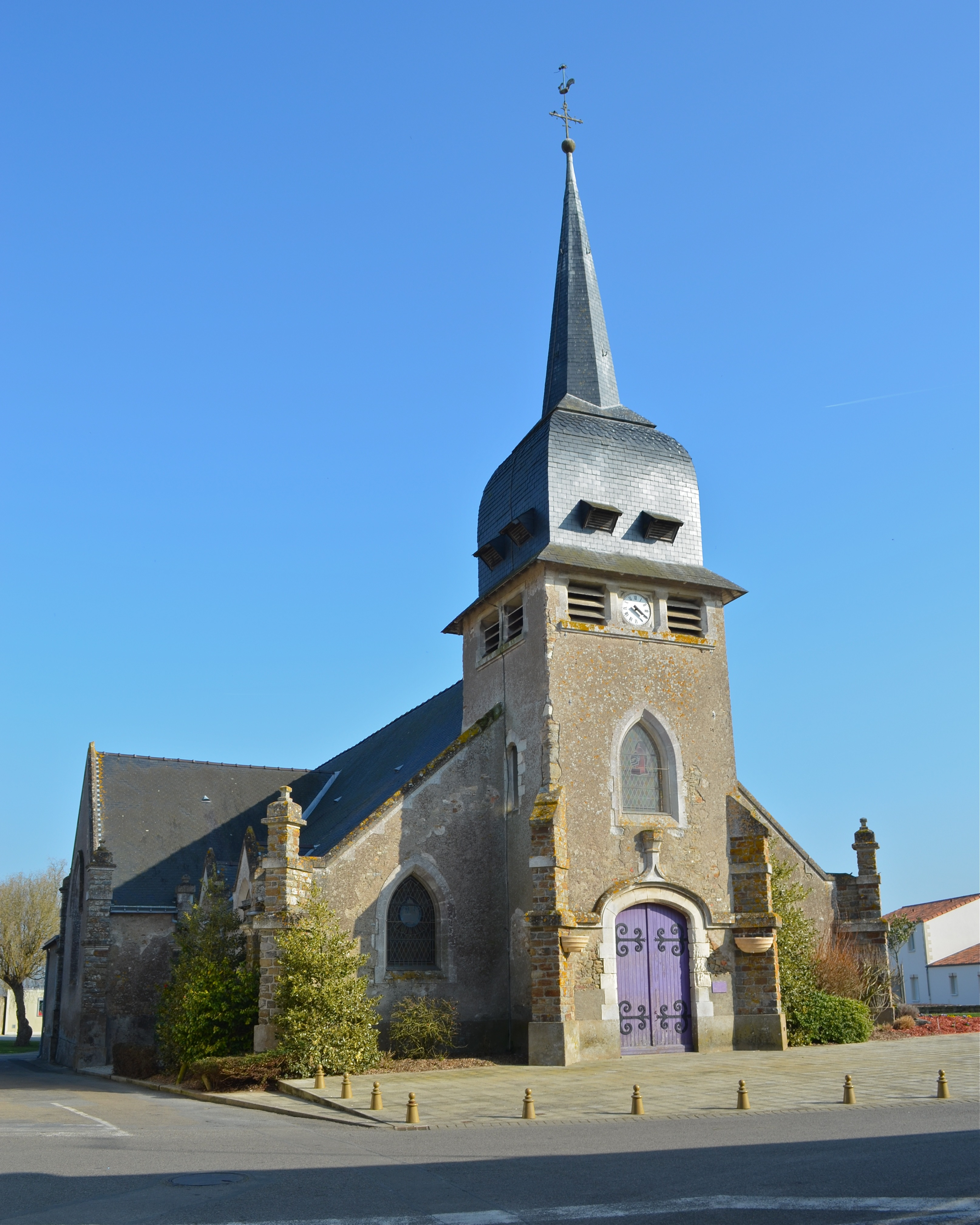

- Coat of arms
- Location of Corsept
- Location within France Location within Pays de la Loire
- Coordinates: 47°16′42″N 2°03′28″W
- Country: France
- Region: Pays de la Loire
- Department: Loire-Atlantique
- Arrondissement: Saint-Nazaire
- Canton: Saint-Brevin-les-Pins
- Intercommunality: Sud-Estuaire

Government
  - Mayor (2020–2026): Hervé Gentes
- Area^{1}: 23.62 km^{2} (9.12 sq mi)
- Highest elevation: 26 m (85 ft)
- Lowest elevation: 0 m (0 ft)
- Population (2023): 2,594
  - Density: 109.8/km^{2} (284.4/sq mi)
- Time zone: UTC+01:00 (CET)
  - Summer (DST): UTC+02:00 (CEST)
- INSEE/Postal code: 44046 /44560
- ^{1} French Land Register data, which excludes lakes, ponds, glaciers > 1 km^{2} (0.386 sq mi or 247 acres) and river estuaries.

Corsept (French pronunciation: [kɔʁsɛ]; Gallo: Corsèt, Breton: Korzed) is a commune in the Loire-Atlantique department in western France.

== Etymology ==
It is believed that the name comes the Latin "Corpus Septimum" because it was the seventh parish on the banks of the Loire under the patronage of St. Martin.

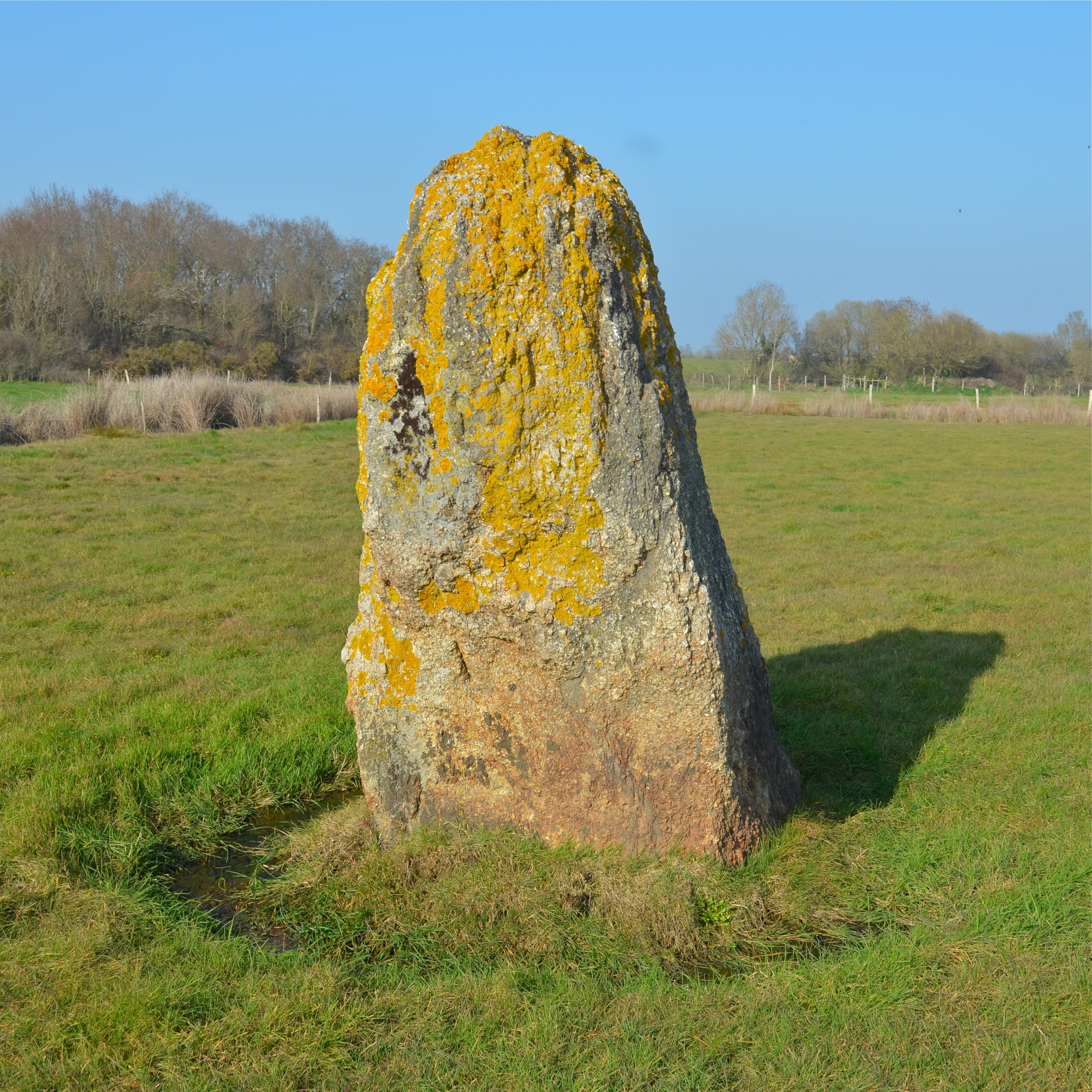
Pierre-Bonde menhir

Corsept is also the site of a number of Celtic dolmens and menhirs.

== History ==
Corsept has been suggested as a potential site for Greek trading city of Corbilo, mentioned by Pytheas, Polybius and Strabo.

== Population ==
Historical population

Year	Pop.	±% p.a.
1793	1,010	—
1821	1,014	+0.01%
1846	1,041	+0.11%
1872	1,080	+0.14%
1901	1,026	−0.18%
1926	836	−0.82%
1946	827	−0.05%
1962	810	−0.13%
1968	807	−0.06%

Year	Pop.	±% p.a.
1975	951	+2.37%
1982	1,351	+5.14%
1990	1,633	+2.40%
1999	1,959	+2.04%
2007	2,562	+3.41%
2012	2,721	+1.21%
2017	2,667	−0.40%
2023	2,594	−0.46%

Source: EHESS and INSEE (1968-2023)

== Culture ==
Since 2000, Corsept has attracted music fans from around the world to the Couvre Feu music festival. In 2015, the festival organizers announced their intention to look for a new site for the festival citing scheduling conflicts.

The current mayor of Corsept has expressed an interest in resettling refugees in the commune, however appropriate housing will not be available until 2017.

== See also ==
- Communes of the Loire-Atlantique department
