= Looe Island =

Small island nature reserve off Cornwall, England

Coordinates: 50°20′12″N 4°27′07″W

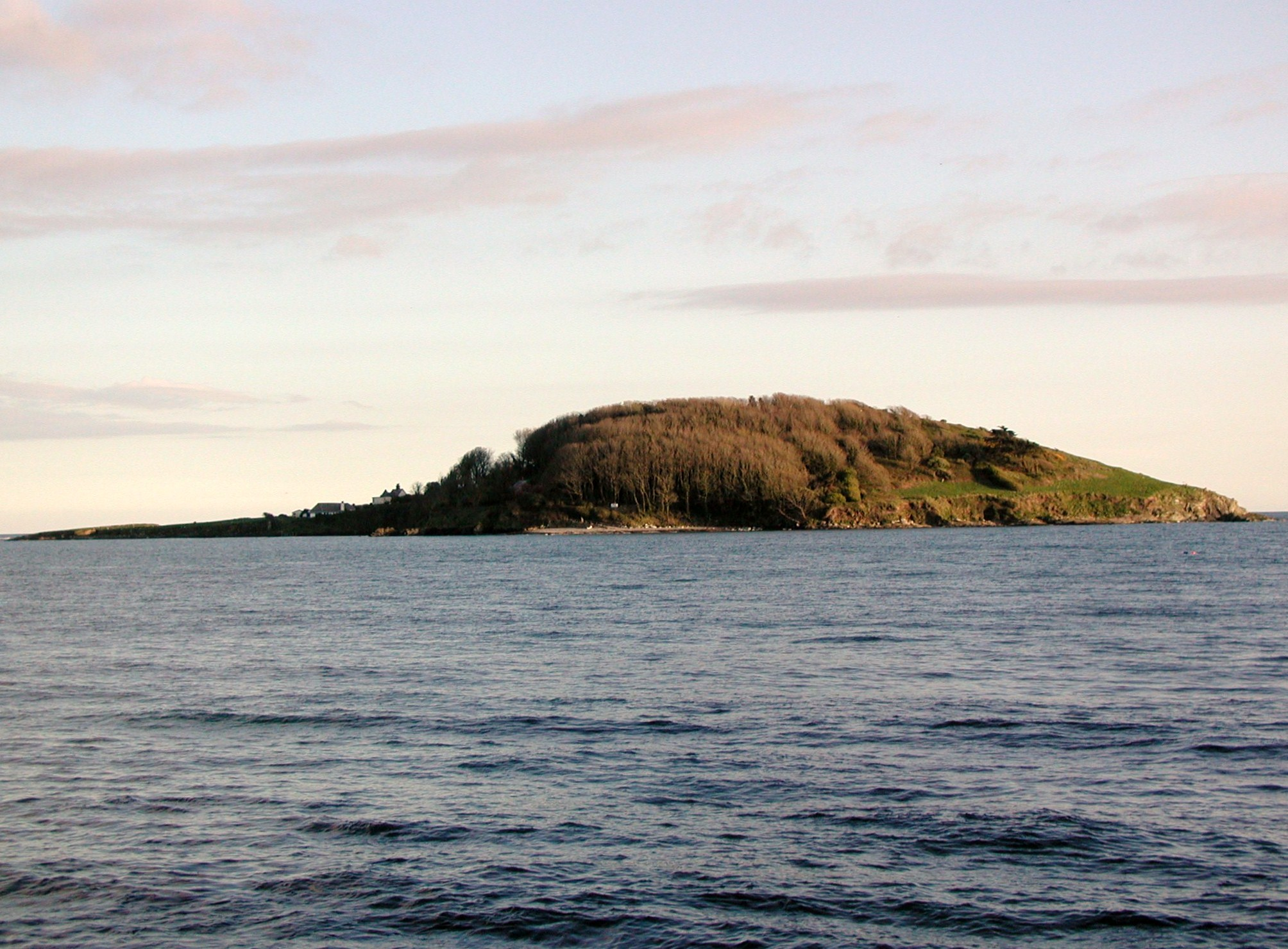
Looe Island, Cornwall

Looe Island (Cornish: Enys Lann-Managh, meaning "island of the monk's enclosure"), also known as St George's Island, is a small island and nature reserve a mile from the mainland town of Looe in Cornwall, England.

According to local legend, Joseph of Arimathea landed here with the Christ Child. Some scholars, including Glyn S. Lewis, suggest the island could be Ictis, the location described by Diodorus Siculus as a centre for the tin trade in pre-Roman Britain.

The island is now owned and managed by the Cornwall Wildlife Trust. Access, including landing on the foreshore and flying of drones over the island, is carefully managed for the benefit of wildlife, and landing is only possible via the Cornwall Wildlife Trust's authorized boat operator. The waters around the island are a marine nature reserve and form part of the Whitsand and Looe Bay Marine Conservation Area. First established in 1995, the Whitsand and Looe Bay Marine Conservation Area covers nearly 5 km of coastline and aims to protect the coastal and marine wildlife around Looe.

== History ==
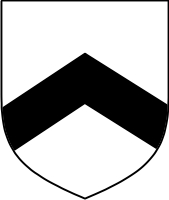
Trelawny arms

People have been living on Looe Island since the Iron Age. Evidence of early habitation includes pieces of Roman amphorae as well as stone boat anchors and Roman coins. A number of late prehistoric or Romano-British finds have been made in the vicinity of the island, including a large bronze ingot found by divers south of Looe Island, which has led a number of people to suggest the island is possibly Ictis, the tin trading island seen by Pytheas in the 4th century BC and recalled by Diodorus Siculus in the 1st century BC. A small hoard of eight late Roman coins was recovered in 2008. These coins were recovered from one of the shallow ditches forming a 'pear shaped enclosure' which encompassed the top of Looe Island and the later Christian chapel site. All eight coins date to the late 3rd or early 4th century AD.

In the Dark Ages, the island was used a seat of early Christian settlement. The child Jesus was believed to have visited the Island with his uncle, Joseph of Arimathea, who traded with the Cornish tin traders. Looe Island was already a place of pilgrimage for early Christians before the creation of this story and a small thatched roofed chapel was built there during this time.

In the later medieval period, the island came under the overall control of Glastonbury Abbey, with the Prior of Lammana being directly responsible for its governance; the island's chapel was under the care of two Benedictine monks until 1289 when the property was sold to a local landowner. The priory was replaced by a domestic chapel served by a secular priest until the Dissolution of the Monasteries in 1536 when it became property of the Crown. From the 13th to the 16th centuries it was known as St Michael's Island but after the dissolution of the monasteries, it was rededicated in 1594 as St George's Island.

Through the 17th and 18th centuries, the island was used by smugglers to avoid the British Government's revenue cutters out of Plymouth and Falmouth. The Guildhall Museum in Looe holds information and research about the smuggling families of Looe Island and information is also available in the more recent publications about the island.

During the Second World War, Looe Island was for a time renamed as 'H.M.S St. George', following the dropping of a probable parachute mine which resulted in a large crater in the summit. It was believed the island was mistaken for an Allied ship. The incident was recorded in The Cornish Times under the headline "H.M.S St. George. Nazi Airman's Direct Hit Off Looe – Another 'Success' for the Luftwaffe". The article continued "H.M.S St. George is still riding peacefully at her anchorage in Looe Bay, after being bombed recently by a Nazi air-raider in what would seem to have been an attempt to sink her. Although St. George has occupied the same berth for millennia, and is as well-known to inhabitants and visitors to Looe as the palms of their hands, no one has determined to what particular class of battleship she belongs, indeed all are familiar with the shapely hulk lying seaward of Hannafore as Looe Island (or, cartographically St. Georges Island)".

In 1965 the island was bought for £25,000 (equivalent to £423,300 in 2025) by two sisters, Babs and Evelyn Atkins. They wrote two books chronicling their purchase and subsequent life on Looe; We Bought An Island (Note: (1976, ISBN 0-245-52940-3)) and its sequel Tales From Our Cornish Island. (Note: (1986, ISBN 0-245-54265-5)) Evelyn died in 1997 at the age of 87; Babs continued to live on the island until her death in 2004, at the age of 86. On her death, the island was bequeathed to Cornwall Wildlife Trust; it will be preserved as a nature reserve in perpetuity. Today the wardens for Cornwall Wildlife Trust live on the island and manage it for the benefit of wildlife. The adjoining islet, formerly known as Little Island, now renamed Trelawny Island and connected by a small bridge, was bequeathed by Atkins back to the Trelawny family, who previously owned Looe Island from 1743 to 1921.

== Geography ==
Situated in the English Channel, about one mile from East Looe in the direction of Polperro, it is about 22.5 acres (9 ha) in area and a mile (1.6 km) in circumference. Its highest point is 47 metres (154 ft) above sea level. Looe Island, like much of south west England, has a mild climate with frost and snow being rare.

The island is owned and managed by the Cornwall Wildlife Trust. This is a non-profit-making venture, the landing fees and other income being devoted to conserving the island's natural environment and providing facilities. The island is open during the summer to day visitors arriving by the Trust's authorised boat operator. After a short welcome talk visitors are directed to the small visitor centre from where they can pick up a copy of the self-guided trail. Visitors have some two hours on the island and all trips are subject to tides and weather/sea state.

== Media appearances ==
In 2008, Channel 4's archaeology series Time Team visited the island to carry out an investigation into its early Christian history. They excavated the sites of Christian chapels built on both the island and on the mainland opposite. During their dig they found the remains of a Benedictine chapel that was built in c.1139 by monks from Glastonbury Abbey, a reliquary, graves and the remains of much earlier Anglo-Romano places of worship built of wood with dating evidence suggesting use by Christians before the reign of Constantine the Great.

In 1994/95 Andrew Hugill composed Island Symphony, an electro-acoustic piece utilising sampled sounds sourced over the net plus recorded natural sounds from the island itself.

== See also ==
- St Michael's Mount
- Mont Saint-Michel
- List of monastic houses in Cornwall
