= Lawless Republic =

2025 book

- Author: Josiah Osgood
- Genre: History
- Publisher: Basic Books
- Publication date: January 21, 2025
- Pages: 384
- ISBN: 978-1541604254

Lawless Republic: The Rise of Cicero and the Decline of Rome is a 2025 history book by classics scholar Josiah Osgood.

The book covers the Crisis of the Roman Republic using the Senate and court speeches of prominent Roman lawyer, statesman and Republican Cicero rather than being a standard biography. It argued that Cicero's success in politics through the courts was not a triumph of the rule of law but due to the decay Roman legal norms through the use of violence, with Cicero's oratory excusing much of the violence that ended the Republic. It also argues that Cicero's skill made him enemies.

Although the book avoids making comparisons to its own time, a number of the reviews have drawn a comparison with the Trump Presidency.
