= Ictis =

Legendary island in the British Isles

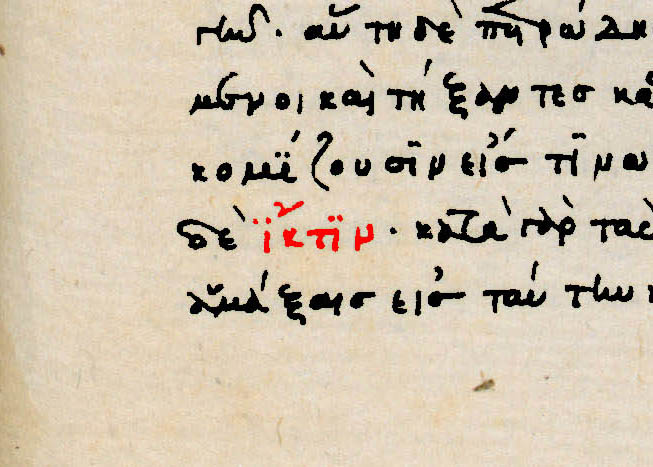
- Ictis (Ἴκτιν) as it appears in Laurentianus Plut-70-1 (f.184v); a prototype manuscript of Diodorus' Bibliotheca Historica (c.1330).
- Other names: Ἴκτιν, Iktin, Mictim

Geography
- Location: British Isles
- Type: Emporium

Ictis (Ancient Greek: Ἴκτιν, romanized: Íktin) was a British island described as a tin trading centre in the Bibliotheca historica of the Sicilian-Greek historian Diodorus Siculus, writing in the first century BC.

While Ictis is widely accepted to have been an island somewhere off the southern coast of what is now England, scholars continue to debate its precise location. Candidates include St Michael's Mount and Looe Island off the coast of Cornwall, the Mount Batten peninsula and Burgh Island in Devon, Hengistbury Head in Dorset and the Isle of Wight further to the east.

== Sources ==
=== Diodorus Siculus ===
The most detailed description of Ictis is found in the Bibliotheca Historica (5.22) of Diodorus Siculus, written in ancient Greek. (Note: The Greek of Diodorus Siculus reads as follows: §1. ἀλλὰ περὶ μὲν τῶν κατʼ αὐτὴν νομίμων καὶ τῶν ἄλλων ἰδιωμάτων τὰ κατὰ μέρος ἀναγράψομεν ὅταν ἐπὶ τὴν Καίσαρος γενομένην στρατείαν εἰς Βρεττανίαν παραγενηθῶμεν, νῦν δὲ περὶ τοῦ κατʼ αὐτὴν φυομένου καττιτέρου διέξιμεν. τῆς γὰρ Βρεττανικῆς κατὰ τὸ ἀκρωτήριον τὸ καλούμενον Βελέριον οἱ κατοικοῦντες φιλόξενοί τε διαφερόντως εἰσὶ καὶ διὰ τὴν τῶν ξένων ἐμπόρων ἐπιμιξίαν ἐξημερωμένοι τὰς ἀγωγάς. οὗτοι τὸν καττίτερον κατασκευάζουσι φιλοτέχνως ἐργαζόμενοι τὴν φέρουσαν αὐτὸν γῆν.αὕτη δὲ πετρώδης οὖσα διαφυὰς ἔχει γεώδεις, ἐν αἷς τὸν πόρον κατεργαζόμενοι καὶ τήξαντες καθαίρουσιν. ἀποτυποῦντες δʼ εἰς ἀστραγάλων ῥυθμοὺς κομίζουσιν εἴς τινα νῆσον προκειμένην μὲν τῆς Βρεττανικῆς, ὀνομαζομένην δὲ Ἴκτιν· κατὰ γὰρ τὰς ἀμπώτεις ἀναξηραινομένου τοῦ μεταξὺ τόπου ταῖς ἁμάξαις εἰς ταύτην κομίζουσι δαψιλῆ τὸν καττίτερον.ἴδιον δέ τι συμβαίνει περὶ τὰς πλησίον νήσους τὰς μεταξὺ κειμένας τῆς τε Εὐρώπης καὶ τῆς Βρεττανικῆς· κατὰ μὲν γὰρ τὰς πλημυρίδας τοῦ μεταξὺ πόρου πληρουμένου νῆσοι φαίνονται, κατὰ δὲ τὰς ἀμπώτεις ἀπορρεούσης τῆς θαλάττης καὶ πολὺν τόπον ἀναξηραινούσης θεωροῦνται χερρόνησοι. ἐντεῦθεν δʼ οἱ ἔμποροι παρὰ τῶν ἐγχωρίων ὠνοῦνται καὶ διακομίζουσιν εἰς τὴν Γαλατίαν· τὸ δὲ τελευταῖον πεζῇ διὰ τῆς Γαλατίας πορευθέντες ἡμέρας ὡς τριάκοντα κατάγουσιν ἐπὶ τῶν ἵππων τὰ φορτία πρὸς τὴν ἐκβολὴν τοῦ Ῥοδανοῦ ποταμοῦ) This was first translated into English by George Booth (1700; reprinted 1814), but C. H. Oldfather's translation of 1939 is more often used:

But we shall give a detailed account of the customs of Britain and of the other features which are peculiar to the island when we come to the campaign which Caesar undertook against it, and at this time we shall discuss the tin which the island produces. The inhabitants of Britain who dwell about the promontory known as Belerium are especially hospitable to strangers and have adopted a civilized manner of life because of their intercourse with merchants of other peoples. They it is who work the tin, treating the bed which bears it in an ingenious manner. This bed, being like rocks contains earthy seams and in them the workers quarry the ore which they then melt down and cleanse of its impurities. Then they work the tin into pieces the size of knuckle-bones and convey it to an island which lies off Britain and is called Ictis for at the time of ebb-tide the space between this island and the mainland becomes dry and they can take the tin in large quantities over to the island on their wagons. (And a peculiar thing happens in the case of the neighbouring islands which lie between Europe and Britain, for at flood-tide the passages between them and the mainland run full and they have the appearance of islands, but at ebb-tide the sea recedes and leaves dry a large space, and at that time they look like peninsulas.) On the island of Ictis the merchants purchase the tin of the natives and carry it from there across the Strait to Galatia or Gaul; and finally, making their way on foot through Gaul for some thirty days, they bring their wares on horseback to the mouths of the river Rhone.

A more recent English translation by Lionel Scott appeared in 2022 and one by Casevitz & Jacquemin into French in 2015.

In the Greek text of Diodorus, the name appears, in the accusative case, as "Iktin", so that translators have inferred that the nominative form of the name was "Iktis", rendering this into the medieval lingua franca of Latin (which only rarely used the letter 'k') as "Ictis". However, some commentators doubt that "Ictis" is correct and prefer "Iktin".

Diodorus Siculus, who flourished between about 60 and about 30 BC, is supposed to have relied for his account of the geography of Britain on a lost work of Pytheas, a Greek geographer from Massalia who made a voyage around the coast of Britain near the end of the fourth century BC, searching for the source of amber. The record of the voyage of Pytheas was lost in antiquity but was known to some later writers, including Timaeus, Posidonius, and Pliny the Elder. Their work is contradictory, but from it deductions can be made about what was reported by Pytheas. This "represents all that was known about the tin trade in the ancient classical world".

Scott (2022) gives Diodorus 5.22 as F5 in his study of Pytheas's fragments; but only as a secondary source referenced via Timaeus (FGrH 566 F164.22). Unlike Strabo and Pliny, Diodorus never explicitly cites his sources, however there are several clues that his source was Timaeus:

- Diodorus mentions Timaeus by name in the introduction to book 5 (5.1.3), meaning he had access to him as a source.
- Pliny states (NH 4.16/30) that Timaeus is the source for his reference to Ictis (as the accusative "Mictim" with "m"-prothesis: a possible dittography), so Timaeus is the only author known for certain to mention the place.
- When Timaeus was writing in the early 3rd century BC, Pytheas was the only source of information on the British Isles and Northern Europe.
- Pliny states that whilst Pytheas called the Amber Isles Abalus, Timaeus referred to them as Basilia (NH 37.11). Diodorus (5.23) refers to Basileia but never mentions Abalus.
- Diodorus also made use of Posidonius as a source, as did Strabo, but Strabo does not mention Ictis while Pliny, who uses Timaeus, does. Posidonius never visited the British Isles but was aware of their tin trade, perhaps also from Timaeus or Pytheas.
- Diodorus' measurements for the size of Britain correspond to Pytheas' as quoted by Strabo and Pliny:

Side	Length (stadia)		Length (miles)
Side	Diodorus	Strabo	Pliny
Kantion–Belerion	7500		
Kantion–Orka	15,000		
Orka to Belerion	20,000	20,000	
Total	42,500	over 40,000	4875

Ultimately Walbank (1956), Mette (1952) and Roller (2006) agree that Diorodus' information on the British Isles is an epitome of Pytheas via Timaeus.

=== Pliny the Elder ===
In his Natural History (4.16 or 4.30), Pliny quotes Timaeus and refers to "insulam Mictim":

Ex adverso huius situs Britannia insula, clara Graecis nostrisque monimentis, inter septentrionem et occidentem iacet, Germaniae, Galliae, Hispaniae, multo maximis Europae partibus, magno intervallo adversa. Albion ipsi nomen fuit, cum Britanniae vocarentur omnes de quibus mox paulo dicemus. ... Timaeus historicus a Britannia introrsus sex dierum navigatione abesse dicit insulam Ictim, in qua candidum plumbum proveniat; ad eam Britannos vitilibus navigiis corio circumsutis navigare.

This was translated into English by Bostock (1855). In full context of Pliny's description of the British Isles:

Opposite to this coast is the island called Britannia, so celebrated in the records of Greece and of our own country. It is situate to the north-west, and, with a large tract of intervening sea, lies opposite to Germany, Gaul, and Spain, by far the greater part of Europe. Its former name was Albion; but at a later period, all the islands, of which we shall just now briefly make mention, were included under the name of "Britanniæ." This island is distant from Gesoriacum, on the coast of the nation of the Morini, at the spot where the passage across is the shortest, fifty miles. Pytheas and Isidorus say that its circumference is 4875 miles. It is barely thirty years since any extensive knowledge of it was gained by the successes of the Roman arms, and even as yet they have not penetrated beyond the vicinity of the Caledonian forest. Agrippa believes its length to be 800 miles, and its breadth 300; he also thinks that the breadth of Hibernia is the same, but that its length is less by 200 miles. This last island is situate beyond Britannia, the passage across being the shortest from the territory of the Silures, a distance of thirty miles. Of the remaining islands none is said to have a greater circumference than 125 miles. Among these there are the Orcades, forty in number, and situate within a short distance of each other, the seven islands called Acmodæ, the Hæbudes, thirty in number, and, between Hibernia and Britannia, the islands of Mona, Monapia, Ricina, Vectis, Limnus, and Andros. Below it are the islands called Samnis and Axantos, and opposite, scattered in the German Sea, are those known as the Glæsariæ, but which the Greeks have more recently called the Electrides, from the circumstance of their producing electrum or amber. The most remote of all that we find mentioned is Thule, in which, as we have previously stated, there is no night at the summer solstice, when the sun is passing through the sign of Cancer, while on the other hand at the winter solstice there is no day. Some writers are of opinion that this state of things lasts for six whole months together. Timæus the historian says that an island called Mictis is within six days' sail of Britannia, in which white lead is found; and that the Britons sail over to it in boats of osier, covered with sewed hides. There are writers also who make mention of some other islands, Scandia namely, Dumna, Bergos, and, greater than all, Nerigos, from which persons embark for Thule. At one day's sail from Thule is the frozen ocean, which by some is called the Cronian Sea.

The most recent translation into English is by Turner & Talbert (2022) and Scott (2022).

It has been suggested that "insulam Mictim" was a dittographic error for insulam Ictim, and Diodorus and Pliny probably both relied on the same primary source. However, while it is possible that "Mictim" and "Iktin" are one and the same, it is also possible that they are different places. The word "inwards" (introrsus) can be interpreted as meaning "towards our home", and six days' sail from Britain could take a boat to somewhere on the Atlantic coast of what is now France.

=== Other authors ===
No other authors describe Ictis in the same way as Diodorus or Pliny (e.g. an island with that name connected with the tin trade), however several other authors add context.

Strabo stated in his Geography that British tin was shipped to Massalia on the Mediterranean coast of Gaul:

Posidonius, in praising the amount and excellence of the metals, cannot refrain from his accustomed rhetoric, and becomes quite enthusiastic in exaggeration. ... He says that tin is not found upon the surface, as authors commonly relate, but that it is dug up; and that it is produced both in places among the barbarians who dwell beyond the Lusitanians and in the islands Cassiterides; and that from the Britannic Islands it is carried to Marseille.

Julius Caesar, in his De Bello Gallico, says of the Veneti: "This last-named people were by far the most powerful on the coast of Armorica: they had a large fleet plying between their own ports and Britain; they knew more about the handling of ships and the science of navigation than anyone else thereabouts."

Ptolemy refers to the Isle of Wight as νῆσος Οὐηκτὶς (translitterated as Oúektìs or Oúiktìs, see iotacism). The Maritime Itinerary mentions "Vecta". "Vectis" appears in the Ravenna Cosmography. The monophthong "οὐ" before front vowel "η" would have approximated the semivocalic [w] found in Celtic and italic languages and usually represented by ⟨v⟩, but not found in ancient Greek due to its phonotactics. Old Irish sources such as the Sanas Cormaic, In Cath Catharda, Broccán’s Hymn & Saegul Adaim refer to the English channel as nIcht, Icht, Ict and Iucht (showing examples of n-prothesis of old Irish grammar). Bede refers to the inhabitants of Wight as Victuari.

== Debate ==
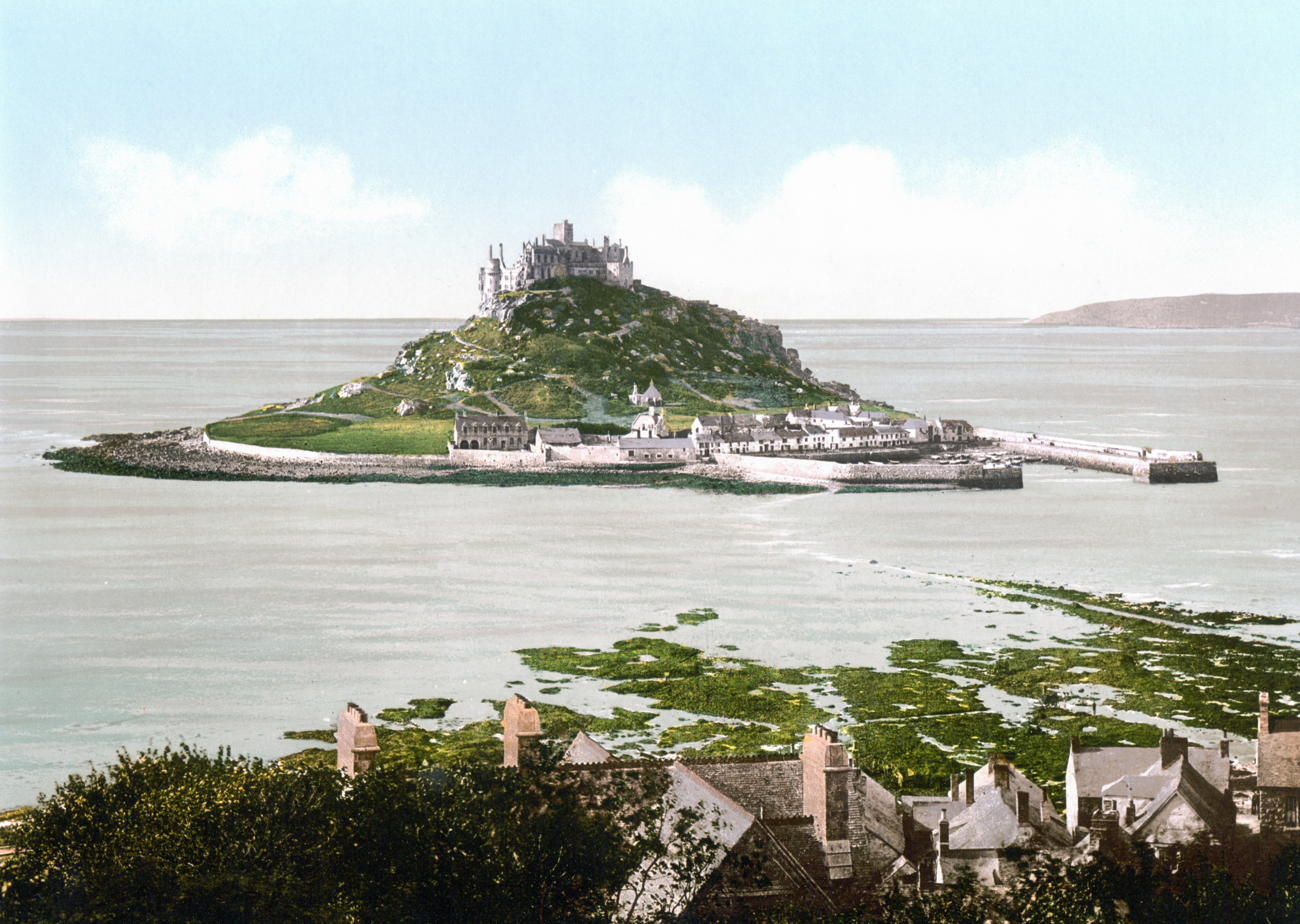
St Michael's Mount, a candidate to be Ictis

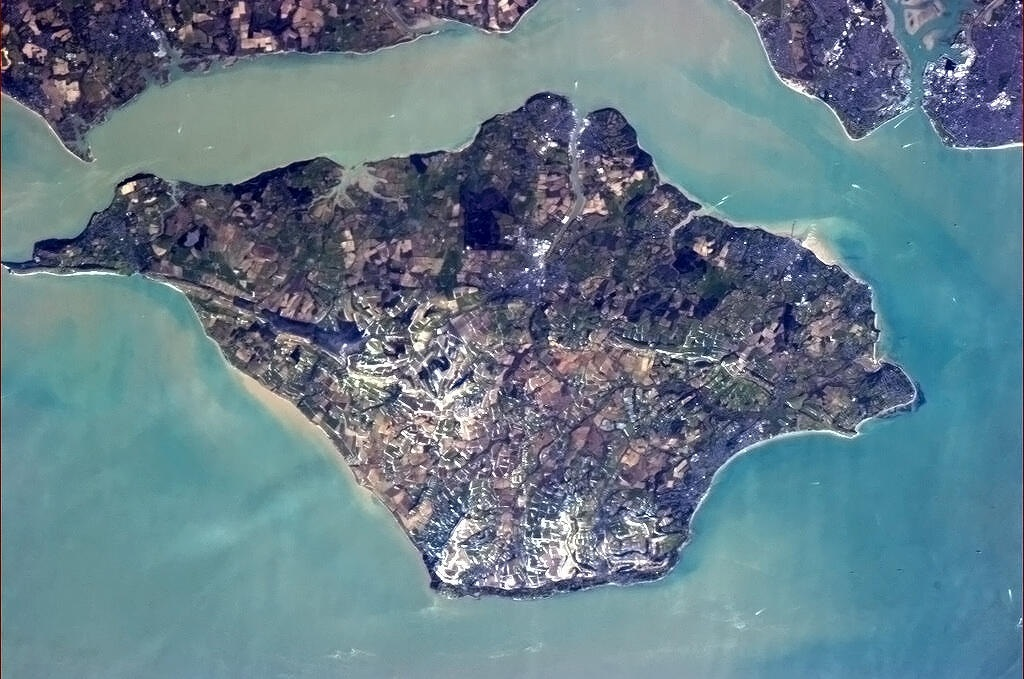
The Isle of Wight, another candidate for Ictis.

William Camden, the Elizabethan historian, took the view that the name "Ictis" was so similar to "Vectis", the Latin name for the Isle of Wight, that the two were probably the same island. The Cornish antiquary William Borlase (1696–1772) suggested that Ictis must have been near the coast of Cornwall and could have been a general name for a peninsula there.

In 1960, Gavin de Beer concluded that the most likely location of Iktin (the form of the name he preferred) was St Michael's Mount, a tidal island near the town of Marazion in Cornwall. Apart from the effect of the tide being consistent with what is said by Diodorus, de Beer considered the other benefits of St Michael's Mount for the Britons. This identification is supported by the Roman Britain website.

In 1972, I. S. Maxwell weighed up the competing claims of no fewer than twelve possible sites. In 1983, after excavations, the archaeologist Barry W. Cunliffe proposed the Mount Batten peninsula near Plymouth as the site of Ictis. Near the mouth of the River Erme, not far away, a shipwreck site has produced ingots of ancient tin, which indicates a trade along the coast, although dating the site is difficult and it may not belong to the Bronze Age.

The assessment of Miranda Aldhouse-Green in The Celtic World (1996) was that:

The two places considered most likely to be Ictis are the island of St Michael's Mount, Cornwall, and the peninsula of Mount Batten in Plymouth Sound (Cunliffe 1983; Hawkes 1984) ... Mount Batten seems archaeologically more likely as there are a number of finds from there which indicate it was prominent in international trade from the fourth century BC until the first century AD (Cunliffe 1988).

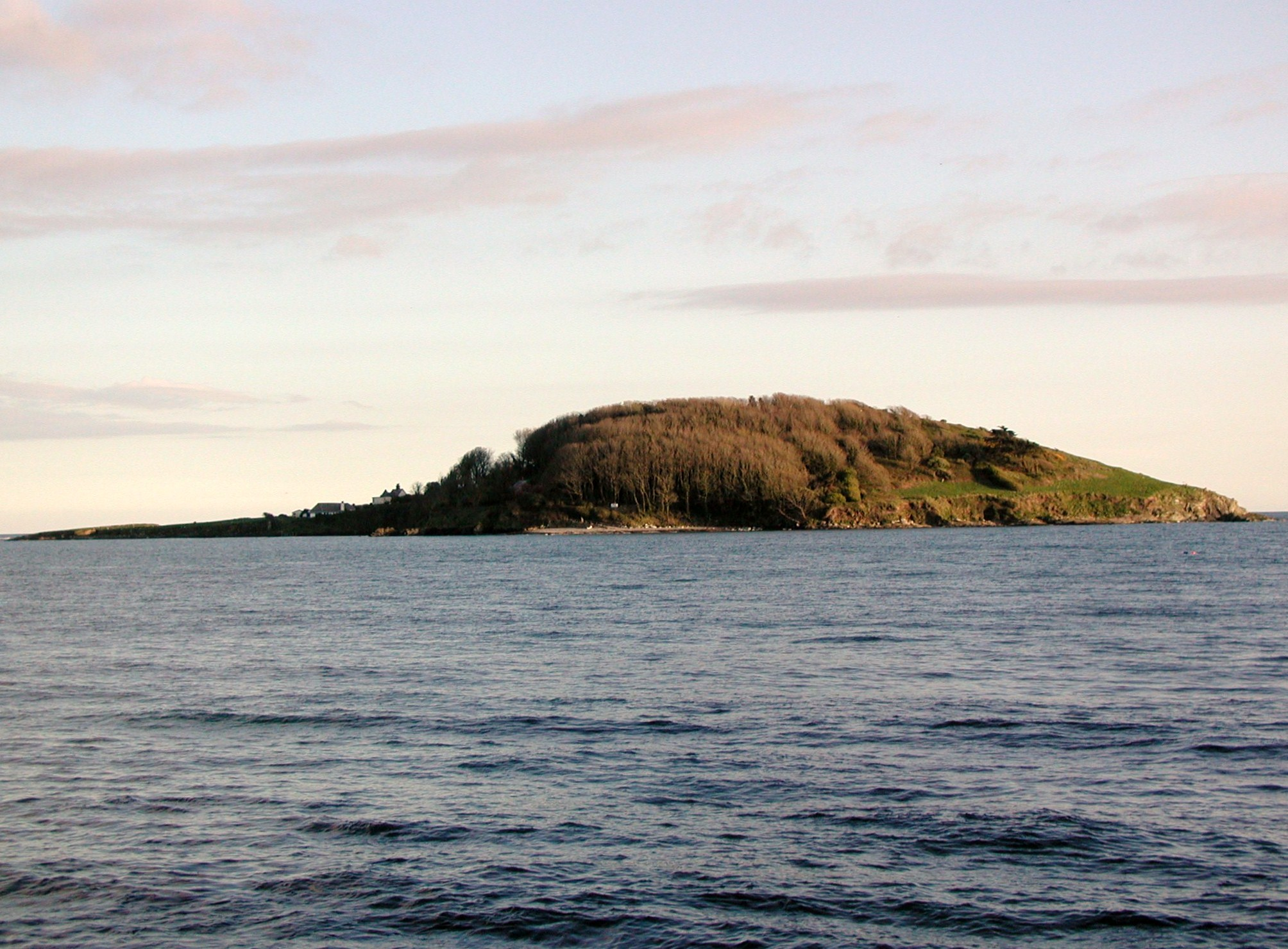
Looe, another island proposed as Ictis

== See also ==
- Mining in Cornwall and Devon
- Tin sources and trade in ancient times
- Isle of Wight
- Pytheas
- Ictimuli
- Corbilo
- Tombolo
- Wilusa - the Hittite name for Troy, which in Greek became known as Ἴλιον (Illion) due to digamma apheresis.
