= Cleopatra (Roller book) =

2010 book by Duane W. Roller

- Author: Duane W. Roller
- Genre: Biography
- Publisher: Oxford University Press
- Publication date: April 2010
- ISBN: 978-0-19-536553-5

Cleopatra: A Biography is a 2010 biography of Cleopatra by Duane W. Roller. It was published by Oxford University Press in April 2010.

== Overview ==
The book is a comprehensive biography of Cleopatra, as well as a history of the Ptolemaic Kingdom in her lifetime.

== Reception ==
Historian Josiah Osgood praised the book for including a substantial amount of historical context for Cleopatra's reign and providing a "no-nonsense" biography of the queen. Carol J. King wrote that "As a corrective to the generally misunderstood and unfairly represented persona of this important historical figure, Roller's book is a valuable contribution to Hellenistic scholarship."

Tracy Lee Simmons of the New York Times wrote that "Roller tells his tale smoothly and accessibly. Scholarly digressions are consigned to helpful appendixes that Roller uses as small seminars for airing points of dispute, as a good many remain."
