= Cleopatra's Daughter (Roller book) =

2018 book by Duane W. Roller

- Author: Duane W. Roller
- Genre: History
- Publisher: Oxford University Press
- Publication date: 2018

Cleopatra's Daughter: And Other Royal Women of the Augustan Era is a 2018 book by Duane W. Roller. It was published by Oxford University Press.

== Overview ==
The book includes the biographies of several royal women in the Mediterranean during the early Principate, including Cleopatra Selene II, Glaphyra of Cappadocia, Salome, Dynamis, Pythodoris of Pontus, Musa of Parthia and Aba, ruler of Olba.

== Reception ==
Archaeologist Jane Draycott wrote that "Roller has succeeded in synthesizing a considerable amount of information that is not necessarily widely known or readily accessible and making it engrossing and entertaining for both specialist and non-specialist readers".

Susan Walker praised the book for "[exposing] the network of relationships between these monarchies", noting that "the sources are often frustratingly thin".
