= Demetrios of Tarsus =

- Δημήτριος τοῦ Ταρσὸν
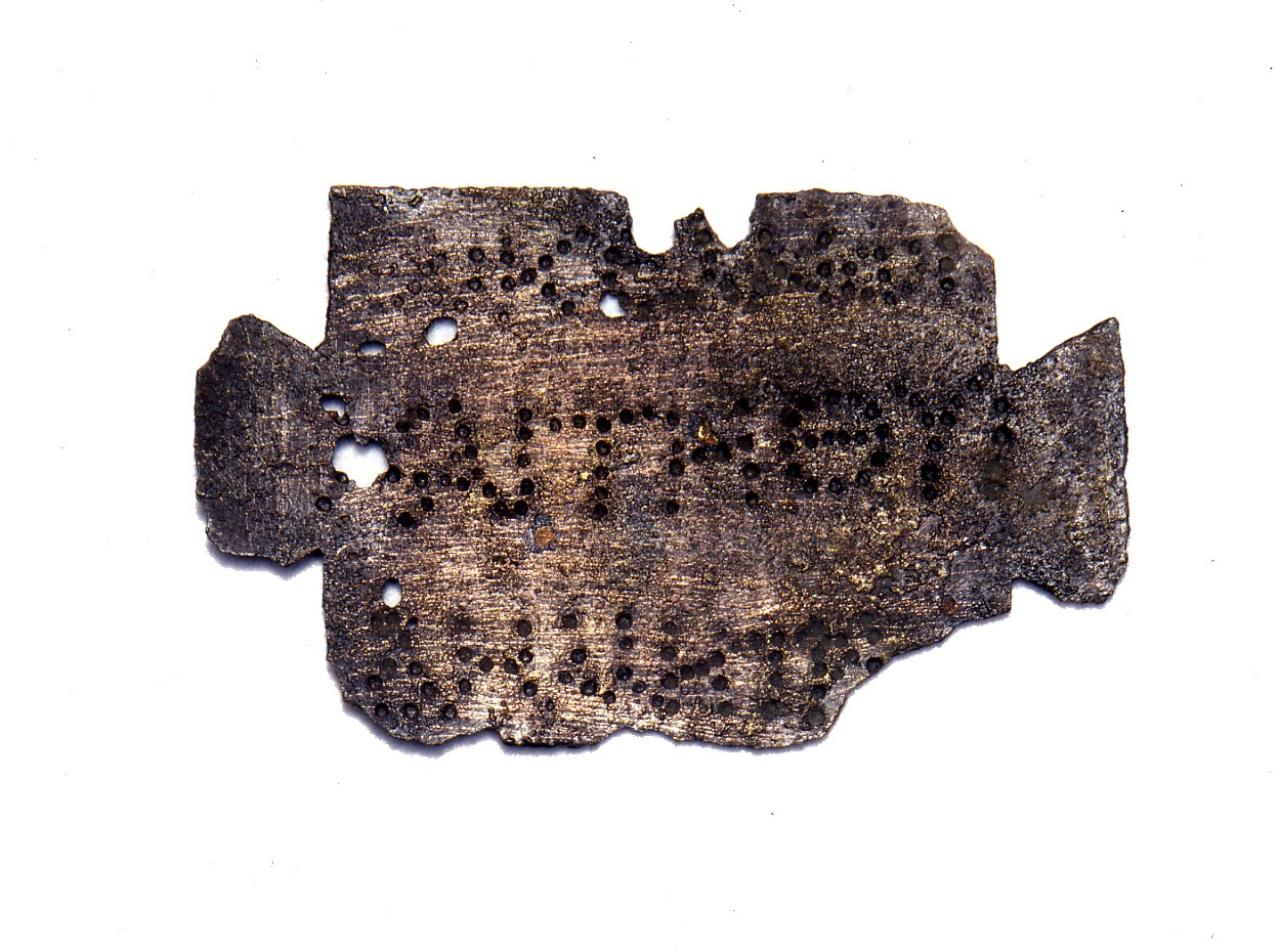
- RIB 663: Dedication to Oceanus and Tethys by a Demetrios, possibly Demetrios of Tarsos.
- Citizenship: Tarsus
- Occupation: Grammarian
- Years active: 1st century AD
- Known for: Voyage to the British Isles

Demetrius of Tarsus (Ancient Greek: Δημήτριος, Latin: Demetrius) was a Greek grammarian known only from Plutarch's work De Oraculorum Defectu (περὶ τῶν ἐκλελοιπότων χρηστηρίων). He is Demetrios 107 in Pauly's Encyclopedia. He is thought to have made a voyage to the British Isles around the 1st century AD. Two bronze dedication plaques by a Demetrios written in ancient Greek have been found in Roman contexts from York: RIB 662 and 663.

His life is dated by him arriving at Delphi a short time before the Pythian Games in A.D. 83–84.

== Voyage to Britain ==
The sole reference to Demetrius' voyage in classical literature is passim Plutarch's On the Obsolescence of Oracles (De Oraculorum Defectu, chapter 18); his voyage to Britain is thought to have occurred at some point around the 1st century AD. He is said to have been commissioned by an unknown king/emperor to undertake the voyage.

Demetrius said that among the islands lying near Britain were many isolated, having few or no inhabitants, some of which bore the names of divinities or heroes. He himself, by the emperor's order, had made a voyage for inquiry and observation to the nearest of these islands which had only a few inhabitants, holy men who were all held inviolate by the Britons. Shortly after his arrival there occurred a great tumult in the air and many portents; violent winds suddenly swept down and lightning-flashes darted to earth. When these abated, the people of the island said that the passing of someone of the mightier souls had befallen. 'For,' said they, 'as a lamp when it is being lighted has no terrors, but when it goes out is distressing to many, so the great souls have a kindling into life that is gentle and inoffensive, but their passing and dissolution often, as at the present moment, fosters tempests and storms, and often infects the air with pestilential properties.' Moreover, they said that in this part of the world there is one island where Cronus is confined, guarded while he sleeps by Briareus; for his sleep has been devised as a bondage for him, and round about him are many demigods as attendants and servants.

Two bronze dedication plaques by a Demetrios written in ancient Greek have been found in Roman contexts from York: RIB 662 and 663. They state "To the gods of the legate’s residence Scribonius Demetrius (set this up)" and "To Ocean and Tethys Demetrius (set this up)." respectively. The latter's association with the Ocean has led to their association with Demetrios of Tarsus' voyage.

== See also ==
- Pytheas of Massalia
- Tarsus, Mersin - Mediterranean port city and capital of the Roman providence of Cilicia
- Tarsus (Bithynia) - inland ancient town in northeast Turkey.
