= Fulvia (book) =

2025 book by Jane Draycott

Fulvia: The Woman Who Broke All the Rules in Ancient Rome is a 2025 book by Jane Draycott, published by Yale University Press. It is a biography of the Roman matron Fulvia.

== Reception ==
The book received mostly positive reviews from critics, who noted that it shed light on an understudied historical figure. Ann Northfield of the Historical Novel Society wrote that "Draycott does an excellent and thoughtful job of reconstructing and evaluating such evidence as there is, in a fair and reflective way." However, some reviewers found Draycott's positive portrayal of Fulvia to be unconvincing.
