= Belerion =

Roman Britain name for southwest England

- Βελέριον (Ancient Greek)
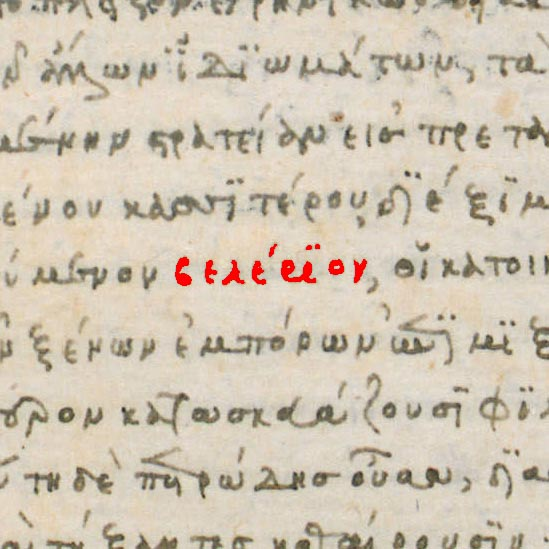
- Belerion (Βελέριον) as it appears in Laurentianus Plut-70-1 (f.184v); a prototype manuscript of Diodorus' Bibliotheca Historica (c.1330).
- Type: Promontory
- Location: Southwest England

Belerion (Ancient Greek: Βελέριον, romanized: Belérion, also Latinised as Belerium or Bolerium) was the southwest promontory of Great Britain as described by Pythéas in the 4th century B.C.. Pythéas' original work has not survived, however he is epitomised by the 1st century B.C. historian Diodorus and the 2nd century A.D. geographer Ptolemy. Its inhabitants, otherwise unnamed, were said to be "hospitable to strangers" because of their tinworking industry, corresponding with the modern counties of Cornwall and Devon.

== Etymology ==
Rivet and Smith (1979) suggest an etymology which associated Belerion with Belenos with the bel- element of Proto-Indo-European supposedly meaning "bright, shining". However, in the Leiden Indo-European etymological dictionary series the element has the meaning "strike, pierce" in proto-Celtic and "war, warfare" in Latin and old italic.

== Quotes ==
Reference to Belerion only found in two sources from classical antiquity: the Bibliotheca Historica and the Geography. Both are secondary or tertiary sources, originally deriving from one primary source: Pytheas.

=== Diodorus ===
The most detailed description of Belerion is found in the Bibliotheca Historica (5.21-22), written in ancient Greek. The relevant phrase is emboldened:

5.21.3-4 αὕτη γὰρ τῷ σχήματι τρίγωνος οὖσα παραπλησίως τῇ Σικελίᾳ τὰς πλευρὰς οὐκ ἰσοκώλους ἔχει. παρεκτεινούσης δʼ αὐτῆς παρὰ τὴν Εὐρώπην λοξῆς, τὸ μὲν ἐλάχιστον ἀπὸ τῆς ἠπείρου διεστηκὸς ἀκρωτήριον, ὃ καλοῦσι Κάντιον, φασὶν ἀπέχειν ἀπὸ τῆς γῆς σταδίους ὡς ἑκατόν, καθʼ ὃν τόπον ἡ θάλαττα ποιεῖται τὸν ἔκρουν, τὸ δʼ ἕτερον ἀκρωτήριον τὸ καλούμενον Βελέριον ἀπέχειν λέγεται τῆς ἠπείρου πλοῦν ἡμερῶν τεττάρων, τὸ δʼ ὑπολειπόμενον ἀνήκειν μὲν ἱστοροῦσιν εἰς τὸ πέλαγος, ὀνομάζεσθαι δʼ Ὄρκαν. τῶν δὲ πλευρῶν τὴν μὲν ἐλαχίστην εἶναι σταδίων ἑπτακισχιλίων πεντακοσίων, παρήκουσαν παρὰ τὴν Εὐρώπην, τὴν δὲ δευτέραν τὴν ἀπὸ τοῦ πορθμοῦ πρὸς τὴν κορυφὴν ἀνήκουσαν σταδίων μυρίων πεντακισχιλίων, τὴν δὲ λοιπὴν σταδίων δισμυρίων, ὥστε τὴν πᾶσαν εἶναι τῆς νήσου περιφορὰν σταδίων τετρακισμυρίων δισχιλίων πεντακοσίων.

5.22 ἀλλὰ περὶ μὲν τῶν κατʼ αὐτὴν νομίμων καὶ τῶν ἄλλων ἰδιωμάτων τὰ κατὰ μέρος ἀναγράψομεν ὅταν ἐπὶ τὴν Καίσαρος γενομένην στρατείαν εἰς Βρεττανίαν παραγενηθῶμεν, νῦν δὲ περὶ τοῦ κατʼ αὐτὴν φυομένου καττιτέρου διέξιμεν. τῆς γὰρ Βρεττανικῆς κατὰ τὸ ἀκρωτήριον τὸ καλούμενον Βελέριον οἱ κατοικοῦντες φιλόξενοί τε διαφερόντως εἰσὶ καὶ διὰ τὴν τῶν ξένων ἐμπόρων ἐπιμιξίαν ἐξημερωμένοι τὰς ἀγωγάς. οὗτοι τὸν καττίτερον κατασκευάζουσι φιλοτέχνως ἐργαζόμενοι τὴν φέρουσαν αὐτὸν γῆν.

This was first translated into English by George Booth (1700; reprinted 1814), but C. H. Oldfather's translation of 1939 is more commonly used:

5.21.3-4 Britain is triangular in shape, very much as is Sicily, but its sides are not equal. This island stretches obliquely along the coast of Europe, and the point where it is least distant from the mainland, we are told, is the promontory which men call Cantium, and this is about one hundred stades from the land, at the place where the sea has its outlet, whereas the second promontory, known as Belerium, is said to be a voyage of four days from the mainland, and the last, writers tell us, extends out into the open sea and is named Orca.

5.22 But we shall give a detailed account of the customs of Britain and of the other features which are peculiar to the island when we come to the campaign which Caesar undertook against it, and at this time we shall discuss the tin which the island produces. The inhabitants of Britain who dwell about the promontory known as Belerium are especially hospitable to strangers and have adopted a civilized manner of life because of their intercourse with merchants of other peoples. They it is who work the tin, treating the bed which bears it in an ingenious manner.

=== Ptolemy ===
Belerion also appears in Ptolemy's Geography (II.3) as an alternative name for the Άντιουέσταιον (or Άλτιουεταίον depending on the manuscript used) promontory. It appears in his description of the British coastline and it the islands southwesterly extreme point, e.g. Lands End:

Ἀντιουέσταιον (Ἀλτιουεσταῖον) ἄκρον τὸ καὶ Βολέριον

Translated and transliterated as:

Ántiouéstaion (ÁltiouestaÍon) or Bolérion promontory

== Location ==
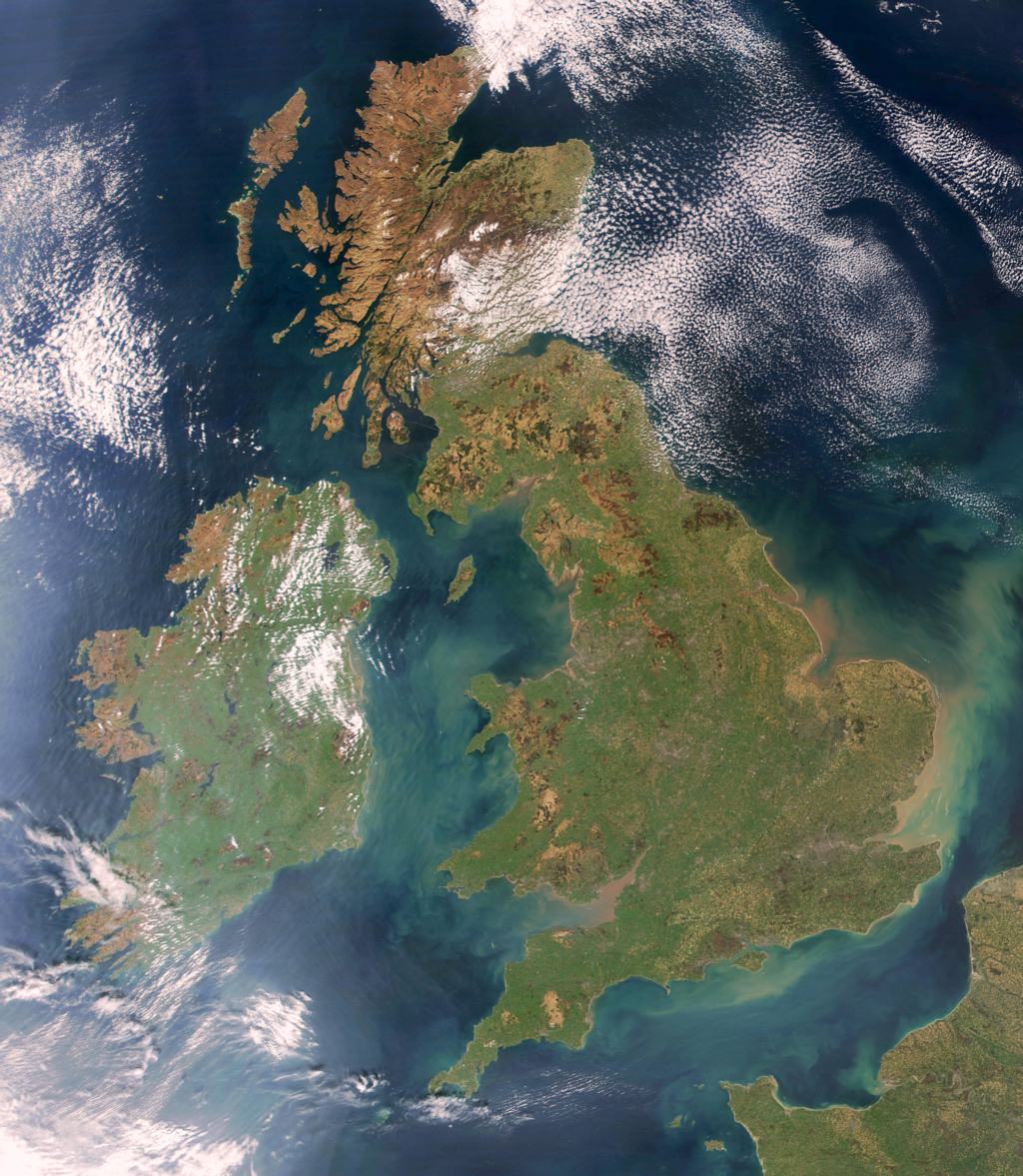
Satellite image of the British Isles. Pytheas described Britain as a triangle with three principal extreme points in the north, east and southwest.

Pytheas (via Diodorus) is not specific about the location of Belerion except that it was a promontory (ἀκρωτήριον) described in general terms in a similar way to Κάντιον (Kent) or Ὄρκαν (northern tip of Scottish mainland, now only surviving in the toponym for Orkney), and that its inhabitants produced tin that was sailed to Ictis and transported to Massalia via continental Gaul. The only places in the British Isles that produced tin were modern counties of Devon and Cornwall. In Ptolemy's Geography Belerion is an alternative (possibly archaic) name for Lands End.

== See also ==
- Mining in Cornwall and Devon
- Ictis
- Bibliotheca Historica
- Ptolemy's Geography
- Beleriand
