= Jane Draycott (archaeologist) =

British archaeologist and historian

Academic background
- Education: University of Nottingham

Academic work
- Discipline: Archaeologist
- Sub-discipline: Roman specialist
- Institutions: University of Glasgow

Jane Draycott is a British archaeologist, historian and biographer who is senior lecturer in Classics at the University of Glasgow.

== Early life and education ==
Draycott graduated from Cardiff University with a master of arts degree in ancient history. She received a master of science in archaeology and anthropology from Cranfield University and a PhD in Classics from the University of Nottingham. She was the 2011-12 Rome Fellow at the British School at Rome and the 2016-2018 LKAS Research Fellow in Classics at the University of Glasgow.

== Career ==
In 2023, Draycott published Prosthetics and Assistive Technology in Ancient Greece and Rome. Draycott also wrote Cleopatra's Daughter, a biography of Cleopatra Selene II. In 2025, she published Fulvia: The Woman Who Broke All the Rules in Ancient Rome, a biography of Fulvia.

Draycott has researched digital history and the depiction of ancient history in video games. She edited Women in Historical and Archaeological Video Games and co-edited Women in Classical Video Games.

She is senior lecturer in Classics at the University of Glasgow.
