= Cleopatra's Daughter (Draycott book) =

2023 book by Jane Draycott

Cleopatra's Daughter: From Roman Prisoner to African Queen
- Cover
- Author: Jane Draycott
- Genre: Biography
- Publisher: Bloomsbury Publishing
- Publication date: 2023
- ISBN: 9781800244825

Cleopatra's Daughter: From Roman Prisoner to African Queen is a 2023 biography of Cleopatra Selene II by archaeologist Jane Draycott.

== Overview ==
The book is written by archaeologist Jane Draycott. It examines the life of Cleopatra Selene II, the daughter of Cleopatra and Mark Antony. Draycott reexamines the literary and archaeological evidence for Cleopatra Selene II's life and her reign in Mauretania to create a full biography of the queen.

== Reception ==
The book received mostly positive reviews. James Romm, writing for Wall Street Journal, noted that Draycott often relied on well-informed speculation to fill in Cleopatra Selene II's biography. Kirkus Reviews praised Draycott's witty anecdotes and writing.

Arienne King of World History Encyclopedia called it "a thorough but accessible biography" that "charts the trajectory of Selene's life from her childhood in Egypt to her captivity in Rome and eventual marriage to the African prince Juba II".
