= Duane W. Roller =

American archaeologist, author and academic (born 1946)

Duane Roller
- Born: October 7, 1946 (age 80)

Academic background
- Education: University of Oklahoma (BA, MA); Harvard University (PhD)

Academic work
- Discipline: Archeology; Classics
- Institutions: Ohio State University; University of Graz

Duane W. Roller (born October 7, 1946) is an American archaeologist, author, and professor emeritus of classics, Greek and Latin at the Ohio State University.

== Education ==
Roller received his Bachelor of Arts degree in letters from the University of Oklahoma in 1966. In 1968, he received his Master of Arts in Latin from the same institution. He obtained his PhD in classical archaeology from Harvard University in 1971.

== Career ==
Roller is a professor emeritus of classics at the Ohio State University, retiring in 2007 but continuing lectures throughout the U.S. In 2008, he was granted a position as a Karl-Franzens Distinguished Professor of Cultural Studies at the University of Graz in Graz, Austria. He has led or participated in various archaeological excavations. These include Greco-Roman sites located in Greece, Italy, Turkey, Israel, Jordan, and northwestern Africa.

Roller is the author of various works, ranging from over two-hundred scholarly journal articles and 20 published books. These works include The Building Program of Herod the Great (1998), focused on Herod the Great of the Herodian kingdom of Judaea, and Cleopatra: a Biography (2010), recounting the early life, reign, and death of Cleopatra VII of Ptolemaic Egypt. His book Tanagran Studies (1989) focuses on the ancient city of Tanagra. He has also published material on the history of geography with his book Ancient Geography (2015). Empire of the Black Sea (2020) examines the Mithridatic dynasty of Asia Minor. His books have been translated into several languages, including Chinese, Modern Greek, and Romanian.

== Awards and grants ==
Roller has been the recipient of numerous rewards for academic work. These include four Fulbright Awards for his teaching roles in India, Poland, Malta, and Austria. He has also received grants from the National Endowment for the Humanities and the National Geographic Society.

== Personal life ==
Roller lives in Santa Fe, New Mexico.

== See also ==
- List of Harvard University people
- List of Ohio State University people

== Bibliography ==
- The Building Program of Herod the Great, California University Press, 1998.
- The World of Juba II and Kleopatra Selene: Royal Scholarship on Rome's African Frontier, Routledge, 2003.
- Through the Pillars of Herakles: Greco-Roman Exploration of the Atlantic, Routledge, 2006.
- Cleopatra: A Biography, Oxford University Press, 2010.
- Ancient Geography: The Discovery of the World in Classical Greece and Rome, I.B.Tauris, 2015.
- A Historical and Topographical Guide to the Geography of Strabo, Cambridge University Press, 2018.
- Cleopatra's Daughter: And Other Royal Women of the Augustan Era, Oxford University Press, 2018.
- Empire of the Black Sea: The Rise and Fall of the Mithridatic World, Oxford University Press, 2020.
- A Guide to the Geography of Pliny the Elder. Cambridge: Cambridge University Press, 2022.
- The Geographical Guide of Ptolemy of Alexandria. An Analysis. London: Routledge, 2023.
