= Baltia =

Island described by ancient sources

Baltia, Basilia or Abalus is a mythic island in northern Europe mentioned in Greco-Roman geography in the connection of amber.

It presumably corresponds to a territory near either the Baltic Sea or the North Sea, perhaps the coast of Prussia, the island of Gotland, Sweden, or of the Jutland Peninsula.

== Sources ==
Pliny the Elder (HN. 4.95; 37.35-36)

"Xenophon of Lampsacus tells us that at a distance of three days' sail from the shores of Scythia, there is an island of immense size called Baltia, which by Pytheas is called Basilia." [...] "Pytheas says that the Gutones, a people of Germany, inhabit the shores of an æstuary of the Ocean called Mentonomon, their territory extending a distance of six thousand stadia; that, at one day's sail from this territory, is the Isle of Abalus, upon the shores of which, amber is thrown up by the waves in spring, it being an excretion of the sea in a concrete form; as, also, that the inhabitants use this amber by way of fuel, and sell it to their neighbours, the Teutones. Timæus, too, is of the same belief, but he has given to the island the name of Basilia.."

Diodorus Siculus (v. 23):

"But as regards the tin of Britain we shall rest content with what has been said, and we shall now discuss the electron, as it is called (amber). Directly opposite the part of Scythia which lies above Galatia there is an island out in the open sea which is called Basileia. On this island the waves of the sea cast up great quantities of what is known as amber, which is to be seen nowhere else in the inhabited world".

== See also ==
- Amber Coast
- Amber Road
- Baltic (name)
- Baltica
