= Pytheas =

Ancient Greek geographer (born ca. 350 BC)

Pytheas of Massalia
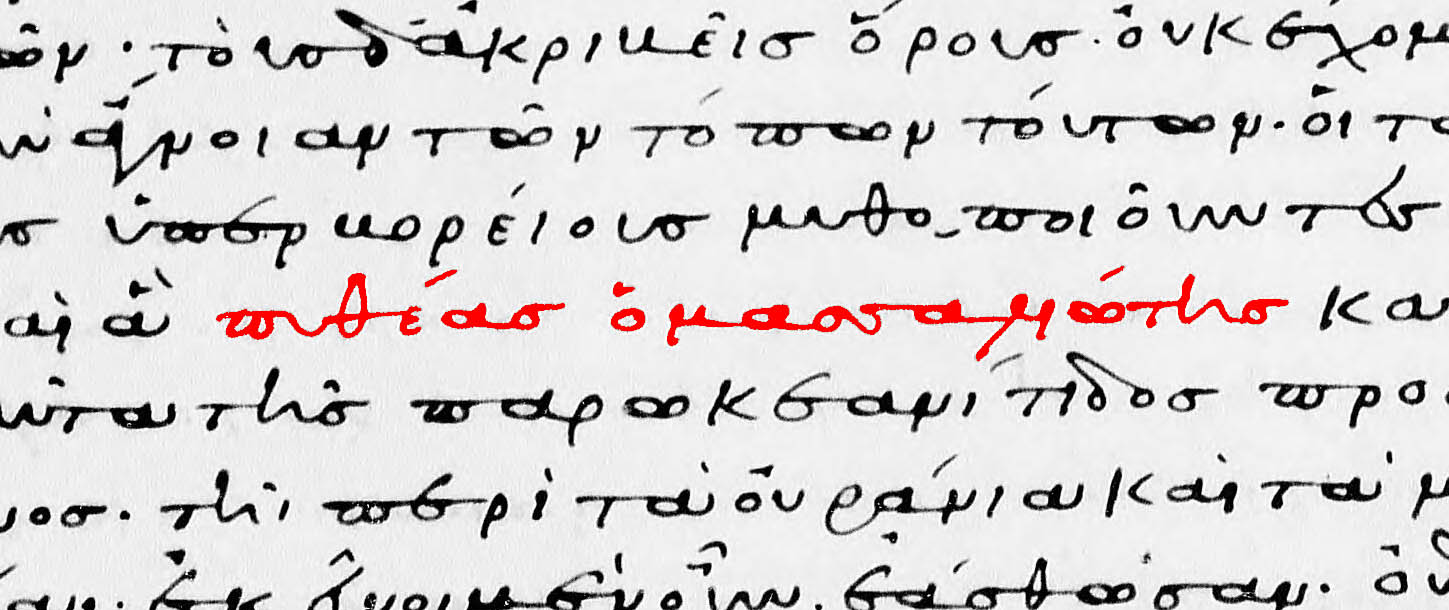
- Pytheas of Massalia (Πυθέας ὁ Μασσαλιώτης) in the 10th century manuscript of Strabo (Geog.7.3.1) written in Byzantine Greek minuscule.
- Born: c. 350 BC; Massalia
- Citizenship: Massaliote
- Known for: Earliest Greek voyage to Britain, the Baltic, and the Arctic Circle for which there is a record, author of Periplus.
- Scientific career
- Fields: Geography, exploration, navigation

Pytheas of Massalia (/ˈpɪθiəs/; Ancient Greek: Πυθέας ὁ Μασσαλιώτης Pythéas ho Massaliōtēs; Latin: Pytheas Massiliensis; born c. 350 BC, fl. c. 320–306 BC) was a Greek geographer, explorer and astronomer from the Greek colony of Massalia (modern-day Marseille, France). He made a voyage of exploration to Northern Europe in about 325 BC, but his account of it, known widely in antiquity, has not survived and is now known only through the writings of others.

On this voyage, he circumnavigated and visited a considerable part of the British Isles. He was the first known Greek scientific visitor to see and describe the Arctic, polar ice, and the Celtic and Germanic tribes. He is also the first person on record to describe the midnight sun. The theoretical existence of some Northern phenomena that he described, such as a frigid zone, and temperate zones where the nights are very short in summer and the sun does not set at the summer solstice, was already known. Similarly, reports of a country of perpetual snow and darkness (the country of the Hyperboreans) had reached the Mediterranean some centuries before.

Pytheas introduced the idea of distant Thule to the geographic imagination, and his account of the tides is the earliest one known that suggests the moon as their cause.

== Record ==
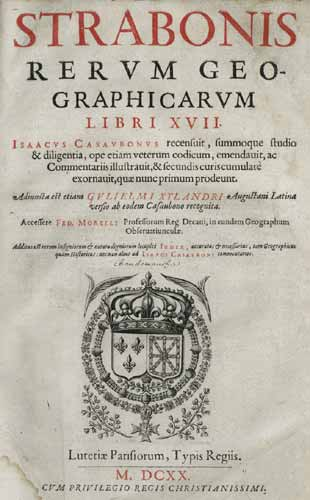
The 1620 edition of Strabo's Geographica, published in Paris.

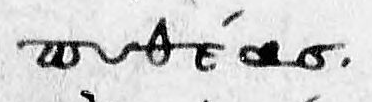
Pytheas (Πυθέας) in Strabo's Geographica, from an 11th century manuscript.

Pytheas described his travels in a work that has not survived; only excerpts remain, quoted or paraphrased by later authors. Much of what is known about Pytheas comes from commentary written by historians during the classical period hundreds of years after Pytheas's journeys occurred, most familiarly in Strabo's Geographica (late 1st century BC, or early 1st century AD), passages in the world history written by Diodorus of Sicily between 60 and 30 BC, and Pliny's Natural History (AD 77).

Diodorus does not mention Pytheas by name. The association is made as follows: Pliny reports: "Timaeus says there is an island named Mictis [...] where tin is found, and to which the Britons cross." Diodorus says that tin was brought to the island of Ictis, where there was an emporium. Walbank (1956), Mette (1952) and Roller (2006) agree that Diorodus' information on the British Isles is an epitome of Pytheas via Timaeus.

Scholars of the 19th century tended to interpret these titles as the names of distinct works covering separate voyages; for example, Smith's Dictionary of Greek and Roman Biography and Mythology hypothesizes a voyage to Britain and Thule written about in "Ocean" and another from Cádiz to the river Don, written about in "A Sailing-Around". As is common with ancient texts, multiple titles may represent a single source, for example, if a title refers to a section rather than the whole. Mainstream consensus is that there was only one work, "On the Ocean", which was based on a periplus, a type of navigational literature.

=== Surviving fragments ===
Only 'fragments' (i.e., quotations in other authors) or references/epitomies survive of Pytheas' original work in the works of other authors. Scott (2022) cited at least 39 such examples.

Table of Concordence: Fragments of Pytheas
Concordence Number				Reference
Scott (2022)	Mette (1952)	Roseman (1994)	Bianchetti (1998)	Reference
F1	F2	T26	F2a, F2b	Aetios III 17.3
F2	F14	T27	F12a	Cleomedes I 4
F3	F9(b)	F9	F13b	Cosmas Indicopleustes, Christian Topography 2.80
F4				Diodoros Siculus 5.21.3–4 ≈ Timaios FGrH 566 F164.21
F5				Diodoros Siculus 5.22.1–4 ≈ Timaios FGrH 566 F164.22
F6				Diodoros Siculus 5.23.1, 4 ≈ Timaios FGrH 566 F164.23
F7	9(a)	F8	F13a	Geminos 6.7–9
F8	F1	F1	F1	Hipparchos of Nicaea, Commentary on the Phaenomena of Aratos and Eudoxos 1.4.1
F9	F3	T28	F23	Marcianus of Heracleia, Epitome of the Periplus of the Inner Sea by Menippos 1.2, GGM 1.565
F10	F13(a)	T18(b)	F9b	Martianus Capella, De Nuptiis Philologiae et Mercurii 6.595
F11		T29	F12b	Martianus Capella, De Nuptiis Philologiae et Mercurii 6.608–9
F12				Mela 3.47–50
F13				Mela 3.54–7
F14	F10(a), 10(b)	T17, T20	F3, F7d, F10	Pliny NH 1.2, 1.4, 1.37
F12	T24	F17		
F15	F13(a)	T18(a)	F9a	Pliny NH 2.186–7
F16	F13(a)	T19	F7e	Pliny NH 2.217
F17	F11(b)	T21	F16	Pliny NH 4.94–7
F18	F11(b)	T22	F7c	Pliny NH 4.102
F19	F11(b)	T23	F8f	Pliny NH 4.103–4
F20	F13(b)			Pliny NH 6.219
F21	F11(a)	T25	F15	Pliny NH 37.35–6
F22	F15	T30	F19	Schol in Ap Rhod 4.761–5a
F23	F6(f)	T1b	F18b	Steph Byz sv ̓Ωστίωνες ≈ Aelius Herodianus, De Pros Cath 3.1.19
F24	F6(a)	F2	F8a	Strabo 1.4.2
F25	F6(a)	T1a, T2, F3	F7a, F8a, F18a	Strabo 1.4.3–4
F26	F6(a)	T3, F5	F6a	Strabo 1.4.5
F27	F6(b)	T4	F8b	Strabo 2.1.12
F28	F6(b)	T5	F11	Strabo 2.1.18
F29	F5	T6	F20	Strabo 2.3.5
F30	F7(a)	T7, T8	F7b, F8d, F21	Strabo 2.4.1–2 = Polyb 34.5.1–13
F30 n 8	F7(b)			
F31	F6(c)	T9, F6	F8c	Strabo 2.5.7–8
F32	F6(c)			Strabo 2.5.41
F33	F6(d)	T10	F14	Strabo 2.5.43
F34	F8	T11	F4	Strabo 3.2.11
F35	F4	T12	F35	Strabo 3.4.4
F36	F7(c)	T13	F5	Strabo 4.2.1 = Polyb 34.10.6–7
F37	F6(e)	T14	F6b	Strabo 4.4.1
F38	F6(g)	T15, F7	F8e	Strabo 4.5.5
F39	F6(h)	T16	F8g	Strabo 7.3.1

== Dating the voyage ==
Pliny said that Timaeus (born about 350 BC) believed Pytheas's story of the discovery of amber. First century BC Strabo said that Dicaearchus (died about 285 BC) did not trust the stories of Pytheas. None of Aristotle's works mention Pytheas, nor do those of Ephorus. Thus the terminus post quem for Pytheas’s voyage are the works of Aristotle and Ephorus, and the terminus ante quem is that of Aristotle's student, Dicaearchus. Henry Fanshawe Tozer estimated that Pytheas's voyage occurred about 330 BC, derived from three main sources.

The earliest extant author to quote Pytheas explicitly is Hipparcus, however he is also widely quoted explicitly by other later authors such as Polybius, Cleomides, Geminus and Aetius; perhaps the last was Dicuil. By far, the most quotations of Pytheas survive in Pliny and Strabo, however they seem to be quoting Pytheas as a tertiary source, perhaps through Timaeus. The Naturalis Historia and Geographica demonstrate that Pytheas was also used by a range of Hellenistic authors starting with Dicaearchus, Timaeus, Eratosthenes, Polybius, Artemidorus and Xenophon of Lampsacus. The extent to which Hecataeus of Abdera's On the Hyperboreans may have been inspired by Pytheas is not known.

Elton (1890) summarises the method of dating as:

"The exact date cannot be ascertained, but is found approximately by the facts that the astronomical discoveries of Pytheas were not mentioned by Aristotle, but were controverted on some points by Dicaearchus, the pupil of Aristotle, whose writings were published not long after the famous philosopher’s death."

With which Roller (2006) agrees:

The most that can be said with certainty is that Pytheas’s journey and the research performed during it, which resulted in the treatise On the Ocean, occurred probably in the 320s BC or very shortly thereafter, since it was unknown to (yet based on) Aristotle, and first quoted by Aristotle’s student Dikaiarchos.

== Circumstances of the voyage ==
Pytheas was the first documented Mediterranean mariner to reach the British Isles.

The start of Pytheas's voyage is unknown. The Carthaginians had closed the Strait of Gibraltar to all ships from other nations. Some historians, mainly of the late 19th century and early, speculated that he must have traveled overland to the mouth of the Loire or the Garonne. Others believed that, to avoid the Carthaginian blockade, he may have stayed close to land and sailed only at night, or taken advantage of a temporary lapse in the blockade.

An alternate theory is that by the 4th century BC, the western Greeks, especially the Massaliotes, were on amicable terms with Carthage. In 348 BC, Carthage and Rome came to terms over the Sicilian Wars with a treaty defining their mutual interests. Rome could use Sicilian markets, Carthage could buy and sell goods at Rome, and slaves taken by Carthage from allies of Rome were to be set free. Rome was to stay out of the western Mediterranean, but these terms did not apply to Massalia, which had its own treaty. During the second half of the 4th century BC, the time of Pytheas' voyage, Massaliotes were presumably free to operate as they pleased; there is, at least, no evidence of conflict with Carthage in any of the sources that mention the voyage.

The early part of Pytheas' voyage was outlined by statements of Eratosthenes that Strabo said are false because they were taken from Pytheas. Apparently, Pytheas said that tides ended at the "sacred promontory" (Hieron akrōtērion, or Sagres Point), and from there to Gades is said to be 5 days' sail. Strabo complained about this distance, and about Pytheas' portrayal of the exact location of Tartessos. Mention of these places in a journal of the voyage indicates that Pytheas passed through the Straits of Gibraltar and sailed north along the coast of Portugal.

== Voyage to Britain ==
=== The "circumnavigation" ===
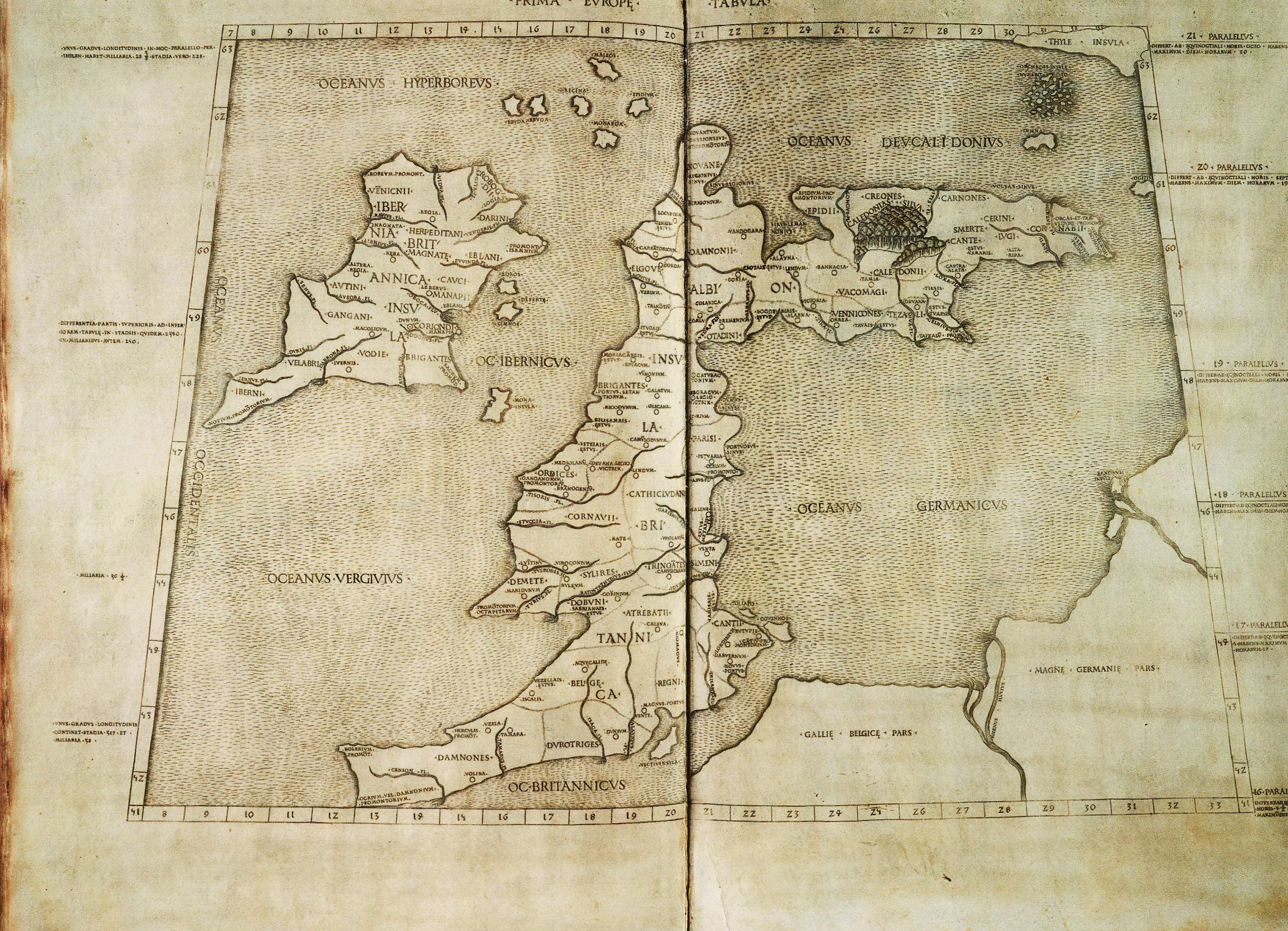
A 1490 Italian reconstruction of the map of Ptolemy. The map is a result of a combination of the lines of roads and of the coasting expeditions during the first century of Roman occupation. One great fault, however, is a lopsided Scotland, which in one hypothesis is the result of Ptolemy using Pytheas' measurements of latitude (see below). Whether Ptolemy would have had Pytheas' real latitudes at that time is a much debated issue.

Strabo reported that Pytheas said he "travelled over the whole of Britain that was accessible". Because there are scant first-hand sources available regarding Pytheas's journey, historians have looked at the etymology for clues about the route he took up the north Atlantic. The word epelthein, at root "come upon", does not imply any specific method, and Pytheas did not elaborate.

Pytheas did use the word "whole" and he stated a perimetros ("perimeter") for Britain of more than 40,000 stadia. Using Herodotus' standard of 600 feet (180 m) for one stadium gives 4,545 miles (7,314 km); however, there is no way to tell which standard foot was in effect. The English foot is an approximation. Strabo wanted to discredit Pytheas on the grounds that 40,000 stadia is outrageously high and cannot be real.

Diodorus Siculus gave a similar number: 42,500 stadia, about 4,830 miles (7,770 km), and explains that it is the perimeter of a triangle around Britain. The consensus has been that he probably took his information from Pytheas through Timaeaus. Pliny gave the circuitus reported by Pytheas as 4,875 Roman miles.

The explorer Fridtjof Nansen explained this apparent fantasy of Pytheas as a mistake of Timaeus. Strabo and Diodorus Siculus never saw Pytheas' work, says Nansen, but they and others read of him in Timaeus. Pytheas reported only days' sail. Timaeus converted days to stadia at the rate of 1,000 per day, a standard figure of the times. However, Pytheas only sailed 560 stadia per day for a total of 23,800, which in Nansen's view is consistent with 700 stadia per degree.

Nansen later states that Pytheas must have stopped to obtain astronomical data. Presumably, the extra time was spent ashore. Using the stadia of Diodorus Siculus, one obtains 42.5 days for the time that would be spent in circumnavigating Britain. It may have been a virtual circumnavigation; see under Thule below.

The perimeter, according to Nansen based on the 23,800 stadia, was 2,375 miles (3,822 km). This number is in the neighborhood of what a triangular perimeter ought to be, but it cannot be verified against anything Pytheas may have said, nor was Diodorus Siculus very precise about the locations of the legs. The "perimeter" is often translated as "coastline", but this translation is misleading. The coastline, following all the bays and inlets, is 7,723 miles (12,429 km) (see Geography of the United Kingdom). Pytheas could have travelled any perimeter between that number and Diodorus'. Polybius added that Pytheas said he traversed the whole of Britain on foot, of which he, Polybius, was skeptical. Despite Strabo's conviction of a lie, the perimeter said to have been given by Pytheas is not evidence of it. The issue of what he did say can never be settled until more fragments of Pytheas's writings are found.

=== Name and description of the British ===
The first known written use of the word Britain was an ancient Greek transliteration of the original P-Celtic term. It is believed to have appeared within a periplus by Pytheas, but no copies of this work survive. The earliest existing records of the word are quotations of the periplus by later authors, such as those within Strabo's Geographica, Pliny's Natural History and Diodorus of Sicily's Bibliotheca historica. According to Strabo, Pytheas referred to Britain as Prettanike \ Bretannikē, which shares more similarities with spellings in the modern Celtic languages than its Classical Latin variants. From this Greek spelling, the name is treated a feminine noun.

A Pictish beast on an early medieval Pictish stone.

"Britain" is most like Welsh Ynys Prydein, "the island of Britain", in which is a P-Celtic cognate of Q-Celtic Cruithne in Irish Cruithen-tuath, "land of the Picts". The base word is Scottish/Irish cruth, Welsh pryd, meaning "form". The British were the "people of forms", with the sense of shapes or pictures, thought to refer to their practice of tattooing or war painting. The Roman word Picti, "the Picts", means "painted".

This etymology suggests Pytheas most likely did not have much interaction with the Irish as their language was Q-Celtic. Rather, Pytheas brought back the P-Celtic form from more geographically accessible regions where Welsh or Breton are spoken presently. Furthermore, some proto-Celtic was spoken over all of Greater Britain, and this particular spelling is prototypical of those more populous regions, but there is no evidence that Pytheas distinguished between the peoples of the archipelago.

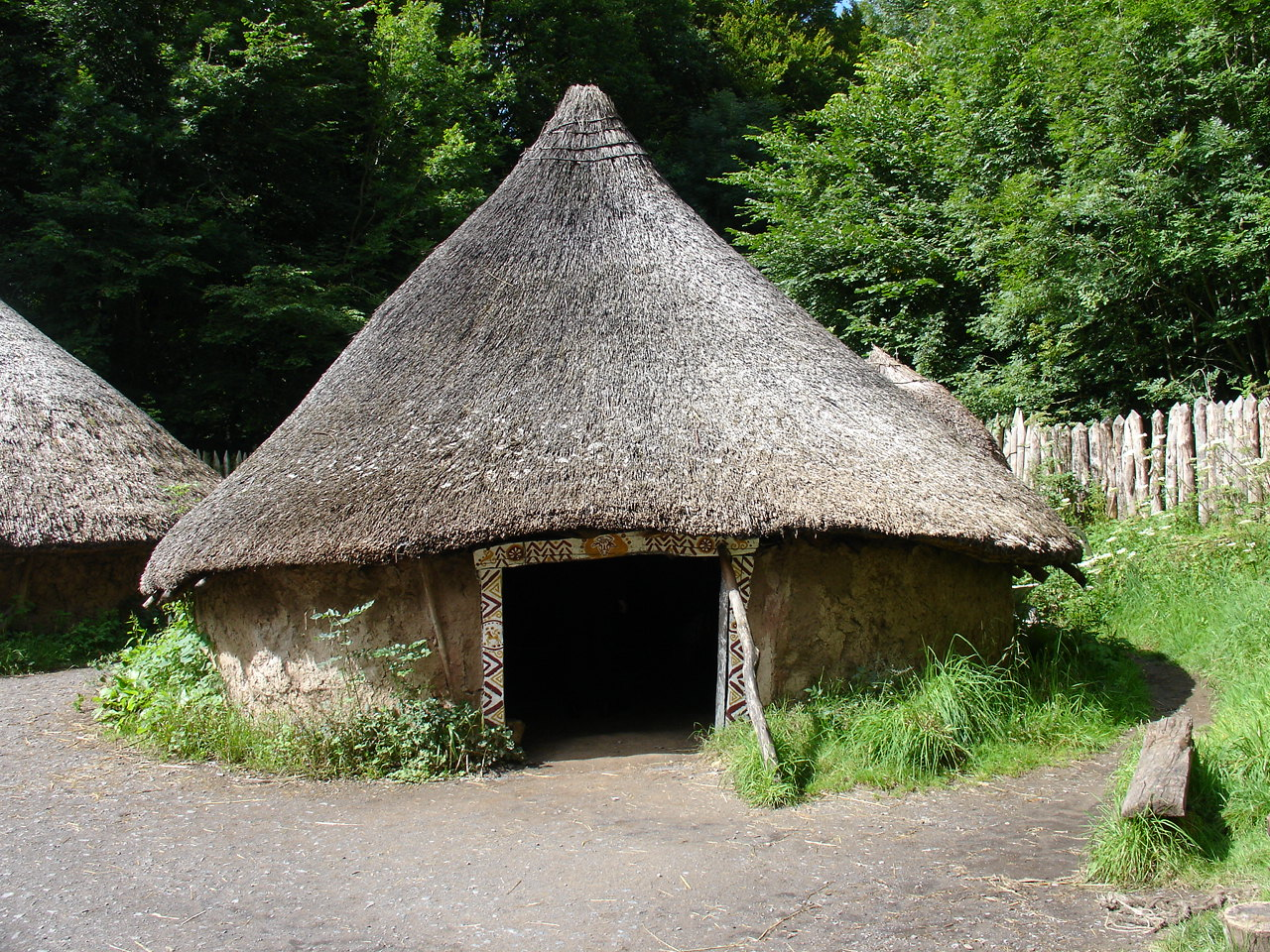
A reconstruction of a Celtic thatched hut in Wales.

Diodorus – based on Pytheas – reported that Britain is cold and subject to frosts, being "too much subject to the Bear", and not "under the Arctic pole", as some translations say. The numerous population of natives, he says, live in thatched cottages, store their grain in subterranean caches and bake bread from it. They are "of simple manners" (ēthesin haplous) and are content with plain fare. They are ruled by many kings and princes who live in peace with each other. Their troops fight from chariots, as did the Greeks in the Trojan War.

=== The three corners of Britain: Kantion, Belerion and Orkas ===
Opposite Europe in Diodorus is the promontory (akrōtērion) of Kantion (Kent), 100 stadia, about 11 miles (18 km), from the land, but the text is ambiguous: "the land" could be either Britain or the continent. Four days' sail beyond that is another promontory, Belerion, which can only be Cornwall, as Diodorus is describing the triangular perimeter and the third point is Orkas, presumably the main island of the Orkney Islands.

=== The tin trade ===
The inhabitants of Cornwall were involved in the manufacture of tin ingots. They mined the ore, smelted it and then worked it into pieces in the shape of knuckle-bones, after which it was transported to the island of Ictis by wagon, which could be done at low tide. Merchants that purchased it there packed it on horses for 30 days to the river Rhône, where it was carried down to the mouth. Diodorus said that the inhabitants of Cornwall were civilized in manner and especially hospitable to strangers because of their dealings with foreign merchants.

=== Scotland ===
The first written reference to Scotland was in 320 BC by Pytheas, who called the northern tip of Britain "Orcas", the source of the name of the Orkney islands.

== Thule ==
Strabo, taking his text from Polybius, related that "Pytheas asserts that he explored in person the whole northern region of Europe as far as the ends of the world." Strabo did not believe it but he explained what Pytheas meant by the ends of the world. Thoulē, he said (now spelled Thule; Pliny the Elder uses Tyle; Vergil references ultima Thule in Georgic I, Line 30, where the ultima refer to the end of the world) is the most northerly of the British Isles. There the circle of the summer tropic is the same as the Arctic Circle (see below on Arctic Circle). Moreover, said Strabo, none of the other authors mention Thule, a fact which he used to discredit Pytheas, but which to moderns indicates Pytheas was the first explorer to arrive there and tell of it.

Thule was described as an island six days' sailing north of Britain, near the frozen sea (pepēguia thalatta, "solidified sea"). Pliny added that it had no nights at midsummer when the sun was passing through the sign of the Crab (at the summer solstice), a reaffirmation that it is on the Arctic Circle. He added that the crossing to Thule started at the island of Berrice, "the largest of all", which may be Lewis in the outer Hebrides. If Berrice was in the outer Hebrides, the crossing would have brought Pytheas to the coast of Møre og Romsdal or Trøndelag, Norway, explaining how he managed to miss the Skagerrak. If this is his route, in all likelihood he did not actually circumnavigate Britain, but returned along the coast of Germany, accounting for his somewhat larger perimeter.

Concerning the location of Thule, a discrepancy in data caused subsequent geographers some problems, and may be responsible for Ptolemy's distortion of Scotland. Strabo reported that Eratosthenes places Thule at a parallel 11500 stadia (1305 miles, or 16.4°) north of the mouth of the Borysthenes. The parallel running through that mouth also passes through Celtica and is Pytheas' base line. Using 3700 or 3800 stadia (approximately 420–430 miles or 5.3°–5.4°) north of Marseille for a base line obtains a latitude of 64.8° or 64.9° for Thule, well short of the Arctic Circle. It is in fact the latitude of Trondheim, where Pytheas may have reached land.

A statement by Geminus of Rhodes quotes On the Ocean as saying:

... the Barbarians showed us the place where the sun goes to rest. For it was the case that in these parts the nights were very short, in some places two, in others three hours long, so that the sun rose again a short time after it had set.

Nansen claimed that according to this statement, Pytheas was there in person and that the 21- and 22-hour days must be the customary statement of latitude by length of longest day. He calculates the latitudes to be 64° 32′ and 65° 31′, partially confirming Hipparchus' statement of the latitude of Thule. And yet Strabo said:

Pytheas of Massalia tells us that Thule ... is farthest north, and that there the circle of the summer tropic is the same as the Arctic Circle.

Eratosthenes extended the latitudinal distance from Massalia to Celtica to 5000 stadia (7.1°), placing the base line in Normandy. The northernmost location cited in Britain at the Firth of Clyde is now northern Scotland. To get this country south of Britain to conform to Strabo's interpretation of Pytheas, Ptolemy has to rotate Scotland by 90°.

The 5000 stadia must be discounted: it crosses the Borysthenes upriver near present-day Kyiv rather than at the mouth. It does place Pytheas on the Arctic Circle, which in Norway is south of the Lofoten islands. It seems that Eratosthenes altered the base line to pass through the northern extreme of Celtica. Pytheas, as related by Hipparchus, probably cited the place in Celtica where he first made land. If he used the same practice in Norway, Thule is at least somewhere on the entire northwest coast of Norway from Møre og Romsdal to the Lofoten Islands.

In his study of Thule, the explorer Richard Francis Burton stated that it had had many definitions over the centuries. Many more authors have written about it than remembered Pytheas. The question of the location of Pytheas' Thule remains. The latitudes given by the ancient authors can be reconciled. The missing datum required to fix the location is longitude: "Manifestly we cannot rely upon the longitude."

Pytheas crossed the waters northward from Berrice, in the north of the British Isles, but whether to starboard, port, or straight ahead is not known. From the time of the Roman Empire all the possibilities were suggested repeatedly by each generation of writers: Iceland, Shetland, the Faroe Islands, Norway and later Greenland. A manuscript variant of a name in Pliny has abetted the Iceland theory: Nerigon instead of Berrice, which sounds like Norway. If one sails west from Norway one encounters Iceland. Burton himself espoused this theory.

The standard texts have Berrice presently, as well as Bergos for Vergos in the same list of islands. The Scandiae islands are more of a problem, as they could be Scandinavia, but other islands had that name as well. Moreover, Procopius says (De Bello Gothico, Chapter 15) that the earlier name of Scandinavia was Thule and that it was the home of the Goths. The fact that Pytheas returned from the vicinity of the Baltic favors Procopius's opinion. The fact that Pytheas lived centuries before the colonization of Iceland and Greenland by European agriculturalists makes them less likely candidates, as he stated that Thule was populated and its soil was tilled.

Concerning the people of Thule Strabo says of Pytheas, but grudgingly:

... he might possibly seem to have made adequate use of the facts as regards the people who live close to the frozen zone, when he says that, ... the people live on millet and other herbs, and on fruits and roots; and where there are grain and honey, the people get their beverage, also, from them. As for the grain, he says, – since they have no pure sunshine – they pound it out in large storehouses, after first gathering in the ears thither; for the threshing floors become useless because of this lack of sunshine and because of the rains.

What he seems to be describing is an agricultural country that used barns for threshing grain rather than the Mediterranean outside floor of sun-baked mud and manufactured a drink, possibly mead.

== Encounter with drift ice ==
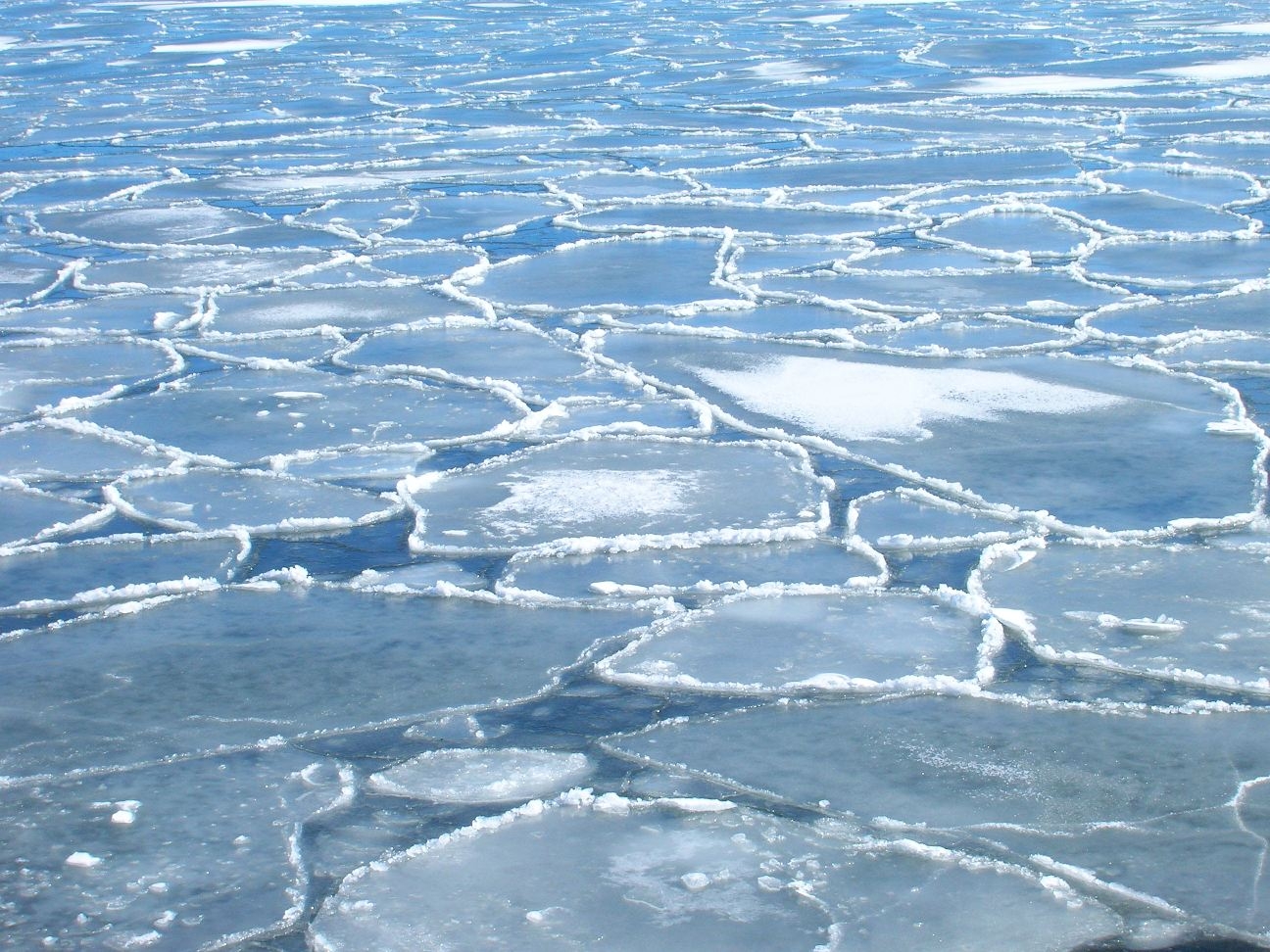
Pancake ice in the Baltic in spring near the Swedish coast.

After mentioning the crossing (navigatio) from Berrice to Tyle, Pliny made a brief statement that:

A Tyle unius diei navigatione mare concretum a nonnullis Cronium appellatur . [One day's sail from Thule is the frozen ocean, called by some the Cronian Sea.]

The mare concretum appears to match Strabo's pepēguia thalatta and is probably the same as the topoi ("places") mentioned in Strabo's apparent description of spring drift ice, which would have stopped his voyage further north and was for him the ultimate limit of the world. Strabo says:

Pytheas also spoke of the waters around Thule and of those places where land properly speaking no longer exists, nor sea nor air, but a mixture of these things, like a "marine lung", in which it was said that earth and water and all things are in suspension as if this something was a link between all these elements, on which one can neither walk nor sail.

The term used for "marine lung" (pleumōn thalattios) appears to refer to jellyfish of the type the ancients called sea-lung. The latter are mentioned by Aristotle in On the Parts of Animals as being free-floating and insensate. They are not further identifiable from what Aristotle says but some pulmones appear in Pliny as a class of insensate sea animal; specifically the halipleumon ("salt-water lung"). William Ogle, a major translator and annotator of Aristotle, attributes the name sea-lung to the lung-like expansion and contraction of the Medusae, a kind of Cnidaria, during locomotion. The ice resembled floating circles in the water. The modern English term for this phenomenon is pancake ice.

The association of Pytheas' observations with drift ice has long been standard in navigational literature, including Nathaniel Bowditch's American Practical Navigator, which begins Chapter 33, Ice Navigation, with Pytheas. At its edge, sea, slush, and ice mix, surrounded by fog.

== Discovery of the Baltic ==
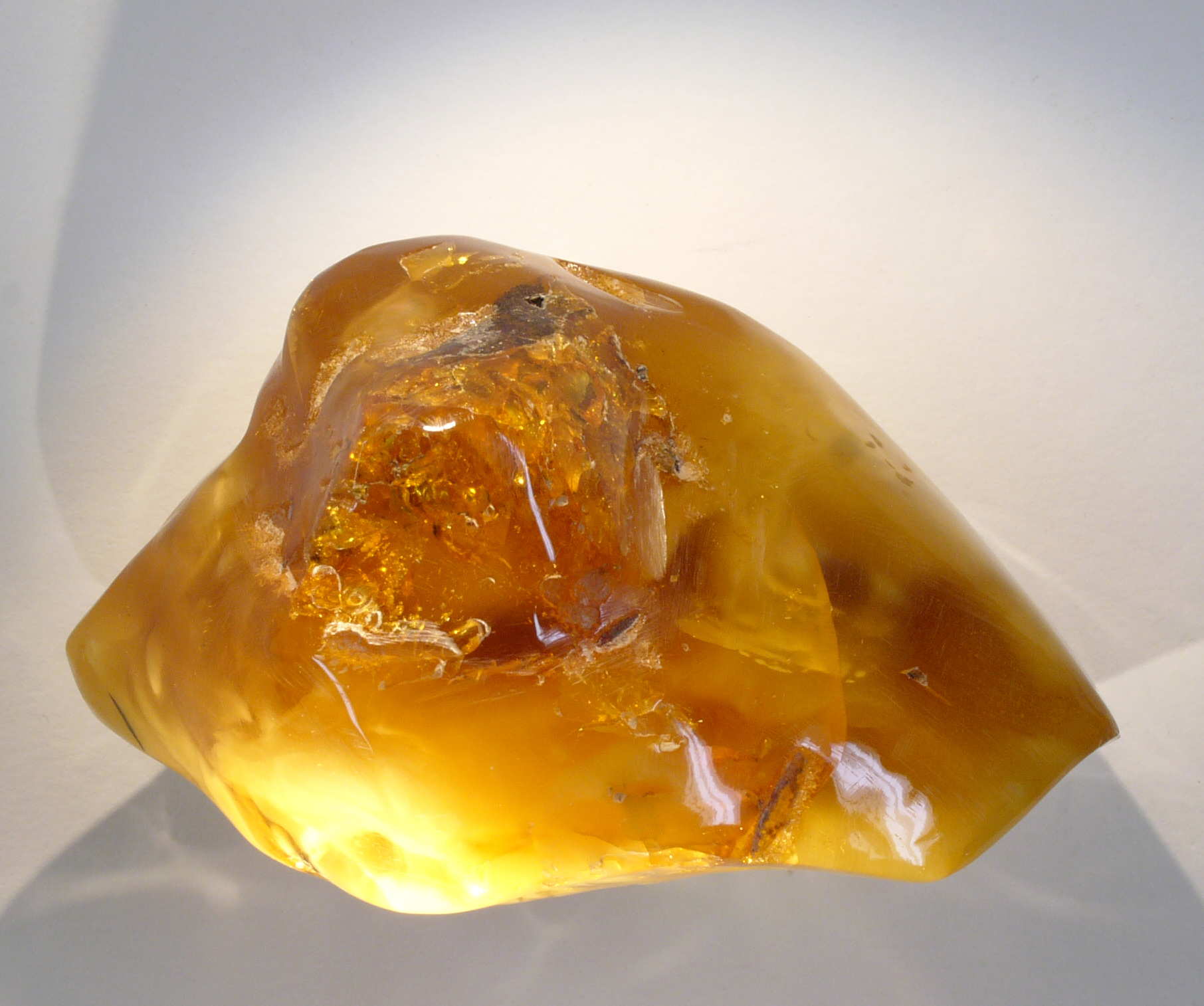
Amber

Strabo said that Pytheas gave an account of "what is beyond the Rhine as far as Scythia", which he, Strabo, thought was false. In the geographers of the late Roman Republic and early Roman Empire, such as Ptolemy, Scythia stretched eastward from the mouth of the river Vistula; thus Pytheas must have described the Germanic coast of the Baltic Sea; if the statement is true, there are no other possibilities. As to whether he explored it in person, he said that he explored the entire north in person (see under Thule above). As the periplus was a sort of ship's log, he probably did reach the Vistula.

According to The Natural History by Pliny the Elder:

Pytheas* speaks of an estuary of the Ocean named Metuonis and extending for 750 miles, the shores of which are inhabited by a German tribe, the Guiones. From here it is a day's sail to the Isle of Abalus, to which, he states, amber is carried in spring by currents, being an excretion consisting of solidified brine. He adds that the inhabitants of the region use it as fuel instead of wood and sell it to the neighbouring Teutones. His belief is shared by Timaeus, who, [c. 356-260] however, calls the island Basilia. Philemon denies the suggestion that amber gives off a flame.

The "Guiones" whom Pliny places in Germania (and not Scythia) are sometimes reinterpreted by modern editors to be Gutones, who are in turn generally seen as predecessors of the later Goths. An alternative interpretation is that Pliny was referring to the Inguaeones, as he does in a related geographical passage about the Germanic part of the northern Oceanic coasts. "Mentonomon" is unambiguously stated to be an aestuarium or "estuary" of 6000 stadia, which using the Herodotean standard of 600 feet (180 m) per stadium is 681 miles (1,096 km). Although it is most often considered to be on the Baltic coast, it has also been argued that Pliny is referring to the North Sea coast, west of present day Denmark.

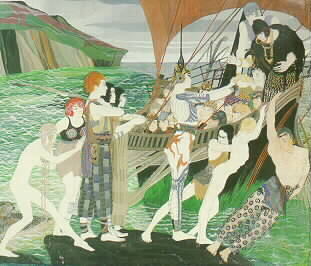
"Pytheas Buys Amber", by Olive Carleton Smyth

In the passage about the northern Ocean coasts Pliny also mentioned that Xenophon of Lampsacus and Pytheas described a very large island which lay three days' sail from the Scythian coast called Balcia by Xenophon and Basilia by Pytheas. Modern scholars note that Pytheas gives this Scythian island the same name that Timaeus later gave to Pytheas's Abalus which Pliny placed in Germania. This raises doubts about the reliability of Pliny's interpretation of older geographers of this region, but it also makes it clear that Pytheas distinguished two large islands.

== Voyage to the Don ==
Pytheas claimed to have explored the entire north; however, he turned back at the mouth of the Vistula, the border with Scythia. If he had gone on he would have discovered the ancestral Balts. They occupied the lands to the east of the Vistula. In the west they began with the people living around Frisches Haff, Lithuanian Aismarės, "sea of the Aistians", who in that vicinity became the Baltic Prussians. On the east Herodotus called them the Neuri, a name related to Old Prussian narus, "the deep", in the sense of water country. Later Lithuanians would be "the people of the shore". The Vistula was the traditional limit of Greater Germany. Place names featuring *ner- or *nar- are wide-ranging over the vast Proto-Baltic homeland, occupying western Russia before the Slavs.

Herodotus said that the Neuri had Scythian customs, but they were at first not considered Scythian. During the war between the Scythians and the Persian Empire, the Scythians came to dominate the Neuri. Strabo denied that any knowledge of the shores of the eastern Baltic existed. He had heard of the Sauromatai, but had no idea where to place them.

Herodotus had mentioned these Sauromatai as a distinct people living near the Neuri. Pliny the Elder, however, was much better informed. The island of Baunonia (Bornholm), he said lies a days' sail off Scythia, where amber is collected. To him the limit of Germany was the Vistula. In contrast to Strabo, he knew that the Goths live around the Vistula, but these were definitely Germans.

By the time of Tacitus, the Aestii had emerged. The former Scythia was now entirely Sarmatia. Evidently the Sarmatians conquered westward to the Vistula. The Goths moved to the south. That the Balts lived east of the Vistula from remote prehistoric times is unquestioned. The Baltic languages, however, are only known from the 2nd millennium AD. They are known to have developed in tribal contexts, as they were originally tribal. The first mention of any tribes is in Ptolemy's description of European Sarmatia, where the main Prussian tribes are mentioned for the first time.

In Tacitus, only the language of the Aestii is mentioned. Strabo distinguished the Venedi, who were likely Slavs. From these few references, which are the only surviving evidence apart from glottochronology and place name analysis, it would seem that the Balts of Pytheas' time were well past the Common Balto-Slavic stage, and likely spoke a number of related dialects. By turning back at what he thought was the limit of Germany, he not only missed the Balts, but did not discover that more Germans, the Goths, had moved into the Baltic area.

Polybius related: "... on his return thence (from the north), he traversed the whole of the coast of Europe from Gades to the Tanais." Some authors consider this leg a second voyage, as it does not seem likely he would pass by Marseille without refitting and refreshing the crew. It is striking that he encountered the border of Scythia, turned around, and went around Europe counter-clockwise until he came to the southern side of Scythia on the Black Sea. It is possible to speculate that he may have hoped to circumnavigate Europe, but the sources do not say. In other, even more speculative interpretations, Pytheas returned north and the Tanais is not the Don but is a northern river, such as the Elbe.

== Measurements of latitude ==
=== Latitude by the altitude of the Sun ===
In discussing the work of Pytheas, Strabo typically used direct discourse: "Pytheas says ..." In presenting his astronomical observations, he changed to indirect discourse: "Hipparchus said that Pytheas says ..." either because he never read Pytheas' manuscript (because it was not available to him) or in deference to Hipparchus, who appears to have been the first to apply the Babylonian system of representing the sphere of the Earth by 360°.

Strabo used the degrees, based on Hipparchus. Neither say that Pytheas did. Nevertheless, Pytheas did obtain latitudes, which, according to Strabo, he expressed in proportions of the gnōmōn ("index"), or trigonometric tangents of angles of elevation to celestial bodies. They were measured on the gnōmōn, the vertical leg of a right triangle, and the flat leg of the triangle. The imaginary hypotenuse looked along the line of sight to the celestial body or marked the edge of a shadow cast by the vertical leg on the horizontal leg.

Pytheas took the altitude of the Sun at Massalia at noon on the longest day of the year and found that the tangent was the proportion of 120 (the length of the gnōmōn) to 1/5 less than 42 (the length of the shadow). Hipparchus, relying on the authority of Pytheas (says Strabo), states that the ratio is the same as for Byzantium and that the two therefore are on the same parallel. Nansen and others prefer to give the cotangent 209/600, which is the inverse of the tangent, but the angle is greater than 45° and it is the tangent that Strabo states. His number system did not permit him to express it as a decimal but the tangent is about 2.87.

It is unlikely that any of the geographers could compute the arctangent, or angle of that tangent. Moderns look it up in a table. Hipparchos is said to have had a table of some angles. The altitude, or angle of elevation, is 70° 47′ 50″ but that is not the latitude.

At noon on the longest day the plane of longitude passing through Marseille is exactly on edge to the Sun. If the Earth's axis were not tilted toward the Sun, a vertical rod at the equator would have no shadow. A rod further north would have a north–south shadow, and as an elevation of 90° would be a zero latitude, the complement of the elevation gives the latitude. The Sun is even higher in the sky due to the tilt. The angle added to the elevation by the tilt is known as the obliquity of the ecliptic and at that time was 23° 44′ 40″. The complement of the elevation less the obliquity is 43° 13′, only 5′ in error from Marseille's latitude, 43° 18′.

=== Latitude by the elevation of the north pole ===
A second method of determining the latitude of the observer measures the angle of elevation of a celestial pole, north in the northern hemisphere. Seen from zero latitude the north pole's elevation is zero; that is, it is a point on the horizon. The declination of the observer's zenith also is zero and therefore so is their latitude.

As the observer's latitude increases (traveling north) so does the declination. The pole rises over the horizon by an angle of the same amount. The elevation at the terrestrial North Pole is 90° (straight up) and the celestial pole has a declination of the same value. The latitude also is 90.

Moderns have Polaris to mark the approximate location of the North celestial pole, which it does nearly exactly. This was not the case in Pytheas' time, due to the precession of the equinoxes. Pytheas reported that the pole was an empty space at the corner of a quadrangle, the other three sides of which were marked by stars. Their identity has not survived but based on calculations these are believed to have been α and κ in Draco and β in Ursa Minor.

Pytheas sailed northward with the intent of locating the Arctic Circle and exploring the "frigid zone" to the north of it at the extreme of the Earth. He did not know the latitude of the circle in degrees. All he had to go by was the definition of the frigid zone as the latitudes north of the line where the celestial arctic circle was equal to the celestial Tropic of Cancer, the tropikos kuklos (refer to the next subsection). Strabo's angular report of this line as being at 24° may well be based on a tangent known to Pytheas, but he did not say that. In whatever mathematical form Pytheas knew the location, he could only have determined when he was there by taking periodic readings of the elevation of the pole (eksarma tou polou in Strabo and others).

Today the elevation can be obtained easily on ship with a quadrant. Electronic navigational systems have made even this simple measure unnecessary. Longitude was beyond Pytheas and his peers, but it was not of as great a consequence, because ships seldom strayed out of sight of land. East–west distance was a matter of contention to the geographers; they are one of Strabo's most frequent topics. Because of the gnōmōn north–south distances were accurate often to within a degree.

It is unlikely that any gnōmōn could be read accurately on the pitching deck of a small vessel at night. Pytheas must have made frequent overnight stops to use his gnōmōn and talk to the natives, which would have required interpreters, probably acquired along the way. The few fragments that have survived indicate that this material was a significant part of the periplus, possibly kept as the ship's log. There is little hint of native hostility; the Celts and the Germans appear to have helped him, which suggests that the expedition was put forward as purely scientific. In any case all voyages required stops for food, water and repairs; the treatment of voyagers fell under the special "guest" ethic for visitors.

=== Location of the Arctic Circle ===
The ancient Greek view of the heavenly bodies on which their navigation was based was imported from Babylonia by the Ionian Greeks, who used it to become a seafaring nation of merchants and colonists during the Archaic period in Greece. Massalia was an Ionian colony. The first Ionian philosopher, Thales, was known for his ability to measure the distance of a ship at sea from a cliff by the very method Pytheas used to determine the latitude of Massalia, the trigonometric ratios.

The astronomic model on which ancient Greek navigation was based, which is still in place today, was already extant in the time of Pytheas, the concept of the degrees only being missing. The model divided the universe into a celestial and an earthly sphere pierced by the same poles. Each of the spheres were divided into zones (zonai) by circles (kukloi) in planes at right angles to the poles. The zones of the celestial sphere repeated on a larger scale those of the terrestrial sphere.

The basis for division into zones was the two distinct paths of the heavenly bodies: that of the stars and that of the Sun and Moon. Astronomers know today that the Earth revolving around the Sun is tilted on its axis, bringing each hemisphere now closer to the Sun, now further away. The Greeks had the opposite model, that the stars and the Sun rotated around the Earth. The stars moved in fixed circles around the poles. The Sun moved at an oblique angle to the circles, which obliquity brought it now to the north, now to the south. The circle of the Sun was the ecliptic. It was the center of a band called the zodiac on which various constellations were located.

The shadow cast by a vertical rod at noon was the basis for defining zonation. The intersection of the northernmost or southernmost points of the ecliptic defined the axial circles passing through those points as the two tropics (tropikoi kukloi, "circles at the turning points") later named for the zodiacal constellations found there, Cancer and Capricorn. During noon of the summer solstice (therinē tropē) rods there cast no shadow. The latitudes between the tropics were called the torrid zone (diakekaumenē, "burned up").

Based on their experience of the Torrid Zone south of Egypt and Libya, the Greek geographers judged it uninhabitable. Symmetry requires that there be an uninhabitable Frigid Zone (katepsugmenē, "frozen") to the north and reports from there since the time of Homer seemed to confirm it. The edge of the Frigid Zone ought to be as far south from the North Pole in latitude as the Summer Tropic is from the Equator. Strabo gives it as 24°, which may be based on a previous tangent of Pytheas, but he does not say. The Arctic Circle would then be at 66°, accurate to within a degree.

Seen from the equator the celestial North Pole (boreios polos) is a point on the horizon. As the observer moves northward the pole rises and the circumpolar stars appear, now unblocked by the Earth. At the Tropic of Cancer the radius of the circumpolar stars reaches 24°. The edge stands on the horizon. The constellation of mikra arktos (Ursa Minor, "little bear") was entirely contained within the circumpolar region. The latitude was therefore called the arktikos kuklos, "circle of the bear". The terrestrial Arctic Circle was regarded as fixed at this latitude. The celestial Arctic Circle was regarded as identical to the circumference of the circumpolar stars and therefore a variable.

When the observer is on the terrestrial Arctic Circle and the radius of the circumpolar stars is 66° the celestial Arctic Circle is identical to the celestial Tropic of Cancer. That is what Pytheas means when he says that Thule is located at the place where the Arctic Circle is identical to the Tropic of Cancer. At that point, on the day of the Summer Solstice, the vertical rod of the gnōmōn casts a shadow extending in theory to the horizon over 360° as the Sun does not set. Under the pole the Arctic Circle is identical to the Equator and the Sun never sets but rises and falls on the horizon. The shadow of the gnōmōn winds perpetually around it.

=== Latitude by length of longest day, and by Sun's elevation on shortest day ===
Strabo used the astronomical cubit (pēchus, the length of the forearm from the elbow to the tip of the little finger) as a measure of the elevation of the Sun. The term "cubit" in this context is obscure; it has nothing to do with distance along either a straight line or an arc, does not apply to celestial distances, and has nothing to do with the gnōmōn. Hipparchus borrowed this term from Babylonia, where it meant 2°. They in turn took it from ancient Sumer so long ago that if the connection between cubits and degrees was known in either Babylonia or Ionia it did not survive. Strabo stated degrees in either cubits or as a proportion of a great circle. The Greeks also used the length of day at the summer solstice as a measure of latitude. It is stated in equinoctial hours (hōrai isēmerinai), one being 1/12 of the time between sunrise and sunset on an equinox.

Based partly on data taken from Pytheas, Hipparchus correlated cubits of the Sun's elevation at noon on the winter solstice, latitudes in hours of a day on the summer solstice, and distances between latitudes in stadia for some locations. Pytheas had proved that Marseille and Byzantium were on the same parallel (see above). Hipparchus, through Strabo, added that Byzantium and the mouth of the Borysthenes, today's Dnieper, were on the same meridian and were separated by 3700 stadia, 5.3° at Strabo's 700 stadia per a degree of meridian arc. As the parallel through the river-mouth also crossed the coast of "Celtica", the distance due north from Marseille to Celtica was 3700 stadia, a baseline from which Pytheas seems to have calculated latitude and distance.

Strabo said that Ierne (written Ἰέρνη, meaning Ireland) is under 5000 stadia (7.1°) north of this line. These figures place Celtica around the mouth of the Loire, an emporium for the trading of British tin. The part of Ireland referenced is the vicinity of Belfast. Pytheas then would either have crossed the Bay of Biscay from the coast of Spain to the mouth of the Loire, or reached it along the coast, crossed the English Channel from the vicinity of Brest, France to Cornwall, and traversed the Irish Sea to reach the Orkney Islands. A statement of Eratosthenes attributed by Strabo to Pytheas, that the north of the Iberian Peninsula was an easier passage to Celtica than across the Ocean, is somewhat ambiguous: apparently he knew or knew of both routes, but he does not say which he took.

At noon on the winter solstice the Sun stands at 9 cubits and the longest day on the summer solstice is 16 hours at the baseline through Celtica. At 2500 stadia, approximately 283 miles, or 3.6°, north of Celtica, are a people Hipparchus called Celtic, but whom Strabo thought were the British, a discrepancy he might not have noted if he had known that the British were also Celtic. The location is Cornwall. The Sun stands at 6 cubits and the longest day is 17 hours. At 9100 stadia, approximately 1032 miles, north of Marseille, 5400 or 7.7° north of Celtica, the elevation is 4 cubits and the longest day is 18 hours. This location is in the vicinity of the Firth of Clyde.

Here Strabo launched another quibble. Hipparchus, relying on Pytheas, according to Strabo, placed this area south of Britain, but he, Strabo, calculated that it was north of Ireland (Ierne/Ἰέρνη). Pytheas, however, rightly knew what is now Scotland as part of Britain, land of the Picts, even though north of Ireland/Ierne. North of southern Scotland the longest day is 19 hours. Strabo, based on theory alone, states that Ierne is so cold that any lands north of it must be uninhabited. In the hindsight given to moderns Pytheas, in relying on observation in the field, appears more scientific than Strabo, who discounted the findings of others merely because of their strangeness to him. The ultimate cause of his skepticism is simply that he did not believe Scandinavia could exist. This disbelief may also be the cause of alteration of Pytheas' data.

== On the tides ==
Pliny reported that "Pytheas of Massalia informs us, that in Britain the tide rises 80 cubits." The passage does not give enough information to determine which cubit Pliny meant; however, any cubit gives the same general result. If he was reading an early source, the cubit may have been the Cyrenaic cubit, an early Greek cubit, of 463.1 mm, in which case the distance was 37 metres (121 ft). This number far exceeds any modern known tides. The National Oceanography Centre, which records tides at tidal gauges placed in about 55 ports of the UK Tide Gauge Network on an ongoing basis, records the highest mean tidal change between 1987 and 2007 at Avonmouth in the Severn Estuary of 6.955 m (22.82 ft).

The highest spring tide between 2008 and 2026 at that location would be 14.64 m (48.0 ft) on 29 September 2015. Even allowing for geologic and climate change, Pytheas' 80 cubits far exceeds any known tides around Britain. One well-circulated but unevidenced answer to the paradox is that Pytheas was referring to a storm surge. Despite the modern arguments, the fact remains that Pytheas experienced tides that exceeded by far the usual tides in the Mediterranean, and particularly those at Massilia.

Matching fragments of Aëtius in pseudo-Plutarch and Stobaeus attribute the flood tides (πλήμμυραι plēmmurai) to the "filling of the moon" (πλήρωσις τῆς σελήνης plērōsis tēs sēlēnēs) and the ebb tides (ἀμπώτιδες ampōtides) to the "lessening" (μείωσις meiōsis). The words are too ambiguous to make an exact determination of Pytheas' meaning, whether diurnal or spring and neap tides are meant, or whether full and new moons or the half-cycles in which they occur. Different translators take different views.

That daily tides should be caused by full moons and new moons is manifestly wrong, which would be a surprising view in a Greek astronomer and mathematician of the times. He could have meant that spring and neap tides were caused by new and full moons, which is partially correct in that spring tides occur at those times. A gravitational theory (objects fall to the center) existed at the time but Pytheas appears to have meant that the phases themselves were the causes (αἰτίαι aitiai). However imperfect or imperfectly related the viewpoint, Pytheas was the first to associate the tides to the phases of the moon.

== Literary influence ==
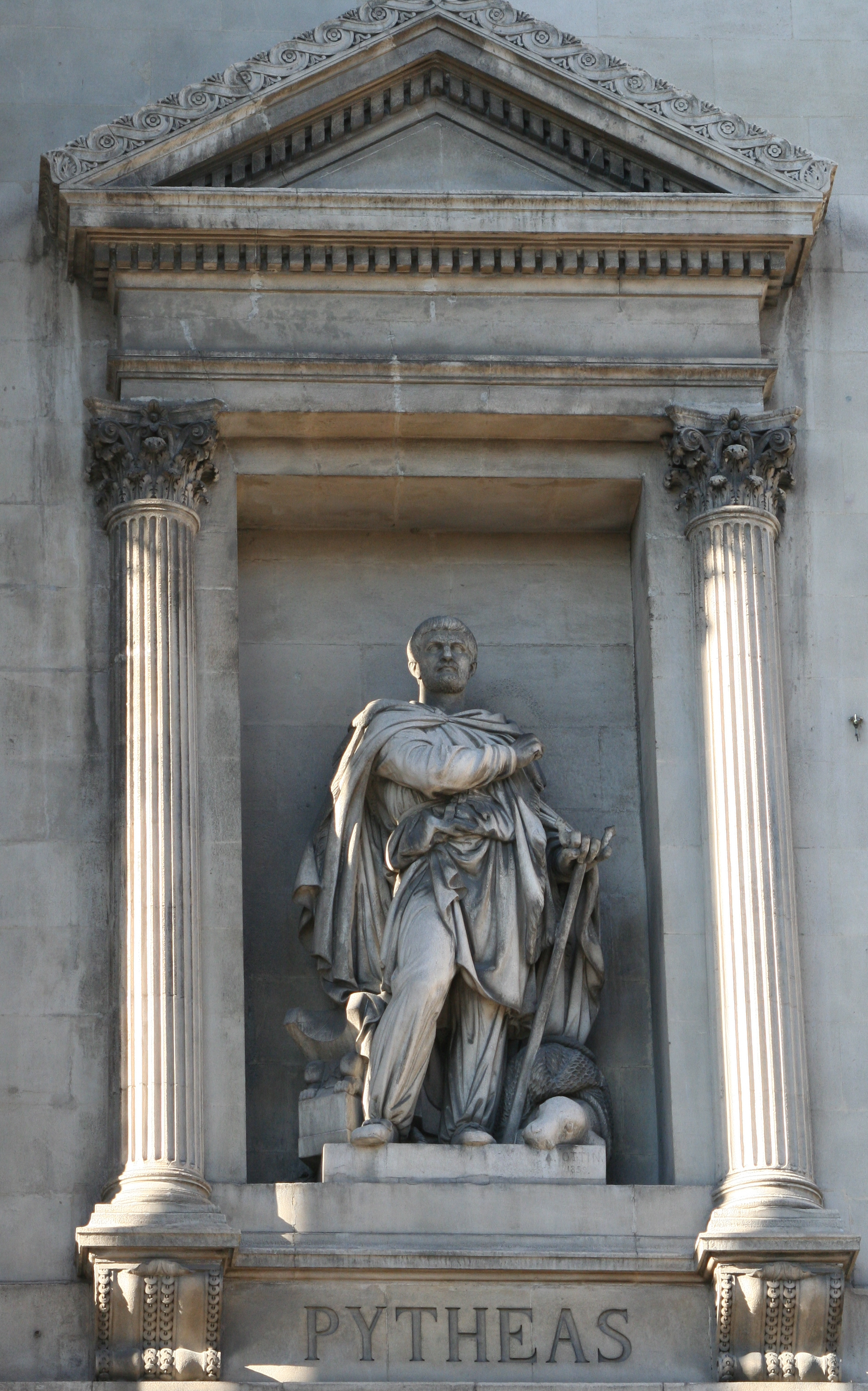
Statue of Pythéas made by Auguste Ottin (1811–1890) and placed on the facade of the Palais de la Bourse in Marseille.

Pytheas was a central source of information on the North Sea and the subarctic regions of western Europe to later periods, and possibly the only source. The only ancient authors we know by name who certainly saw Pytheas' original text were Dicaearchus, Timaeus, Eratosthenes, Crates of Mallus, Hipparchus, Polybius, Artemidorus and Posidonius. Notably the list does not include Strabo or Tacitus, though Strabo discussed him and Tacitus may likely have known about his work. Either of the two could have known him through other writers or could have read his work in the original.

Strabo, citing Polybius, accused Pytheas of promulgating a fictitious journey he could never have funded, as he was a private individual (idiōtēs) and a poor man (penēs). Markham proposes a possible answer to the funding question: seeing that Pytheas was known as a professional geographer and that north Europe was as yet a question mark to Massalian merchants, he suggests that "the enterprise was a government expedition of which Pytheas was placed in command." In another suggestion the merchants of Marseille sent him out to find northern markets. These theories are speculative but perhaps less so than Strabo's contention that Pytheas was a charlatan just because a professional geographer doubted him.

Strabo did explain his reasons for doubting Pytheas' veracity. Citing numerous instances of Pytheas apparently being far off the mark on details concerning known regions, he said: "however, any man who has told such great falsehoods about the known regions would hardly, I imagine, be able to tell the truth about places that are not known to anybody." As an example he mentioned that Pytheas says Kent is several days' sail from Celtica when it is visible from Gaul across the channel. If Pytheas had visited the place he should have verified it personally.

The objection although partially true is itself flawed. Strabo interjected his own view of the location of Celtica, that it was opposite to Britain, end to end. Pytheas, however, places it further south, around the mouth of the Loire (see above), from which it might justifiably be several days' sail. The people across from Britain in Caesar's time were the Germani in the north and the Belgae in the south. Still, some of the Celtic lands were on the channel and were visible from it, which Pytheas should have mentioned but Strabo implies he did not.

Strabo's other objections are similarly flawed or else completely wrong. He simply did not believe the earth was inhabited north of Ierne. Pytheas, however, could not then answer for himself, or protect his own work from loss or alteration, so most of the questions concerning his voyage remain unresolved, to be worked over by every generation. To some he was a daring adventurer and discoverer; to others, a semi-legendary blunderer or prevaricator.

The logical outcome of this tendency is the historical novel with Pytheas as the main character and the celebration of Pytheas in poetry, beginning as far back as Virgil. The process continues into modern times; for example, Pytheas is a key theme in Charles Olson's Maximus Poems. Details of Pytheas' voyage also serve as the backdrop for Chapter I of Poul Anderson's science fiction novel, The Boat of a Million Years. The Stone Stories trilogy by Mandy Haggith (The Walrus Mutterer, 2018; The Amber Seeker, 2019; The Lyre Dancers, 2020) revolve around Pytheas of Massalia's journeys. Swedish author Alf Henrikson in 1985 published a novel framed as a translation of Pytheas's long-lost account of his journey, Pytheas resa till Thule.

== See also ==
- Britain (place name)
- Cruthin
- Euthymenes
- Himilco
- Mining in Cornwall
- Prydain
- Scythia
- Demetrios of Tarsus - who made a similar voyage to the British Isles in the first century AD.

== Bibliography ==
- Burton, Richard F. (1875). Ultima Thule; or, A Summer in Iceland. London and Edinburgh: William P. Nimmo. "Ultima Thule; or, A Summer in Iceland."
- Chevallier, R. (December 1984). "The Greco-Roman Conception of the North from Pytheas to Tacitus". Arctic. 37 (4): 341–346. doi:10.14430/arctic2217. hdl:10515/sy5tb0xz8. JSTOR 40510297.
- Christensen, Arne Søby (2002). Cassiodorus, Jordanes and the History of the Goths: Studies in a Migration Myth. Translated by Flegal, Heidi. Museum Tusculanum Press. ISBN 87-7289-7104.
- Cunliffe, Barry (2002). The Extraordinary Voyage of Pytheas the Greek: The Man Who Discovered Britain (Revised ed.). Walker & Co, Penguin. ISBN 0-14-200254-2.
- Frye, John; Harriet Frye (1985). North to Thule: an imagined narrative of the famous "lost" sea voyage of Pytheas of Massalia in the fourth century B.C. Chapel Hill, NC: Algonquin Books of Chapel Hill. ISBN 978-0-912697-20-8.
- Gimbutas, Marija (1967). Daniel, Glyn (ed.). The Balts. Ancient Peoples and Places. New York: Frederick A. Praeger.
- Hawkes, C.F.C. (1977). Pytheas: Europe and the Greek Explorers. Oxford: Blackwell, Classics Department for the Board of Management of the Myres Memorial Fund. 090356307X.
- Herbaux, François (2024). Pythéas, explorateur du Grand Nord. Les Belles Lettres. ISBN 9782251455280..
- Kaplan, Philip G. (2013). "Pytheas of Massalia". In Bagnall, Roger S (ed.). The Encyclopedia of Ancient History. Wiley-Blackwell. p. 1. doi:10.1002/9781444338386.wbeah21281.pub2. ISBN 978-1-4051-7935-5.
- Markham, Clements R. (June 1893). "Pytheas, The Discoverer of Britain". The Geographical Journal. 1 (6). London: The Royal Geographical Society: 504–524. Bibcode:1893GeogJ...1..504M. doi:10.2307/1773964. JSTOR 1773964.
- Nansen, Fridtjof (1911). In Northern Mists: Arctic Exploration in Early Times. Vol. I. Translated by Arthur G. Chater. New York: Frederick A. Stokes Co.
- Roller, Duane W. (2006). Through the Pillars of Herakles: Greco-Roman Exploration of the Atlantic. London, New York: Routledge. ISBN 978-0-415-37287-9.
- Roseman, Christina Horst (1994). Pytheas of Massalia: On the ocean: Text, translation and commentary. Ares Publishing. ISBN 0-89005-545-9.
- Smith, William (1880). "Pytheas". A dictionary of Greek and Roman biography and mythology. Vol. III. London: J. Murray.
- Spekke, Arnolds (1957) The ancient amber routes and the geographical discovery of the Eastern Baltic. Stockholm: Goppers.
- Stefansson, Vilhjalmur (1940). Ultima Thule: further mysteries of the Arctic. New York: Macmillan Co.
- John Taylor, Albion: the earliest history (Dublin, 2016)
- Tozer, Henry Fanshawe (1897). History of Ancient Geography. Cambridge: University Press. "History of Ancient Geography."
- Warmington, Eric Herbert; Spawforth, Antony (2015). "Pytheas, Greek navigator, c. 310–306 BCE". Oxford Research Encyclopedia of Classics. doi:10.1093/acrefore/9780199381135.013.5459. ISBN 978-0-19-938113-5.
