= Josiah Osgood =

Ancient Rome historian

Josiah Osgood is a historian of Rome. Osgood attended Yale University, from which he earned a Bachelor of Arts, Master of Arts, and Doctor of Philosophy. As of 2026, he is a professor of classics at Georgetown University.

== Publications ==
=== Books authored ===
- Caesar's Legacy: Civil War and the Emergence of the Roman Empire. Oxford University Press. 2006.
- A Suetonius Reader: Selections from the Lives of the Caesars and the Life of Horace. Bolchazy-Carducci Publishers, Inc. 2011. ISBN 978-0-865-16716-2.
- Claudius Caesar: Image and Power in the Early Roman Empire. Cambridge University Press. 2011. ISBN 978-0-521-88181-4.
- Turia: A Roman Woman's Civil War. Women in Antiquity. Oxford: Oxford University Press. 2014. ISBN 978-0-19-983238-5.
- Rome and the Making of a World State, 150 BCE-20 CE. Cambridge, United Kingdom: Cambridge University Press. 2018. ISBN 978-1-107-02989-7.
- Uncommon Wrath: How Caesar and Cato’s Deadly Rivalry Destroyed the Roman Republic. 2022. ISBN 978-1-5416-2011-7.
- Lawless Republic: The Rise of Cicero and the Decline of Rome. Basic Books. 2025. ISBN 978-1-5416-0425-4.

=== Books edited ===
- Braund, Susanna; Osgood, Josiah, eds. (2012). A Companion to Persius and Juvenal. Wiley-Blackwell.
- Osgood, Josiah; Morrell, Kit; Welch, Kathryn, eds. (2019). Alternative Augustan Age. Oxford University Press. ISBN 978-0-190-90140-0.
- Osgood, Josiah; Baron, Christopher, eds. (2019). Cassius Dio and the Late Roman Republic. Historiography of Rome and Its Empire. Vol. 4. Brill. ISBN 978-90-04-40505-9.
- Suetonius (2020). Osgood, Josiah (ed.). How to Be a Bad Emperor: An Ancient Guide to Truly Terrible Leaders. Ancient Wisdom for Modern Readers. Princeton University Press. ISBN 978-0-691-19399-1.
- Sallust (2022). Osgood, Josiah (ed.). How to Stop a Conspiracy: An Ancient Guide to Saving a Republic. Ancient Wisdom for Modern Readers. Princeton University Press. doi:10.2307/j.ctv218m6sg.
