= Settimo Rottaro =

- Comune
- Comune di Settimo Rottaro
- The Parish Church of Saint Bononio Abate Patron

- Coat of arms

- Location within Italy Location within Piedmont
- Coordinates: 45°24′N 8°0′E
- Country: Italy
- Region: Piedmont
- Metropolitan city: Turin (TO)

Government
  - Mayor: Massimo Ottogalli

Area
  - Total: 6.1 km^{2} (2.4 sq mi)
- Elevation: 258 m (846 ft)

Population (31 January 2025)
  - Total: 457
  - Density: 75/km^{2} (190/sq mi)
- Demonym: Rottaresi
- Time zone: UTC+1 (CET)
  - Summer (DST): UTC+2 (CEST)
- Postal code: 10010
- Dialing code: 0125
- Patron saint: St. Bononio Abate
- Saint day: 3 September

Settimo Rottaro (Ël Seto Rojé in Piedmontese language) is a comune (municipality) in the Metropolitan City of Turin in the Italian region Piedmont, located about 45 kilometres (28 mi) northeast of Turin.

== Name ==
It takes its name (Settimo meaning "seventh" in Italian) from its distance from Ivrea, amounting to seven Roman miles. Rottaro derives from rubetum, or also rovearum, rovedarium, the ancient name of a nearby hill full of brambles. Another hypothesis is from the Latin ruera, rutera, indicating the wheels of carts, being a place of transit, which is why three cart wheels were drawn in its coat of arms. A final - and less certain - hypothesis, would lead it back to the name of the Lombard king Rothari (647).

== Geography ==
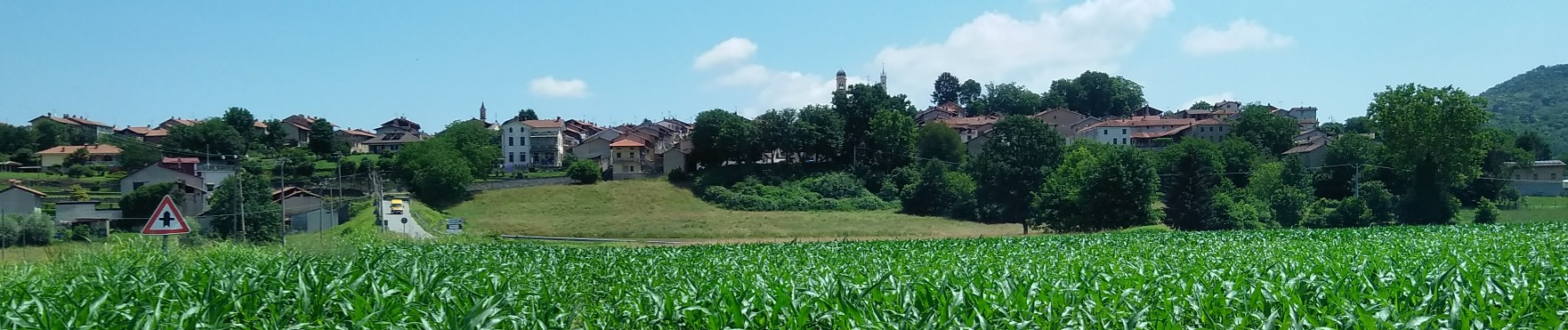
View of Settimo Rottaro

The town is located on the extreme border of eastern Canavese, not far from Lake Viverone (formerly in the Province of Biella), reachable to the east from the town of Azeglio. To the south it borders with Cossano Canavese, Borgo d'Ale and Alice Castello, while to the south-west with Caravino.

== History ==
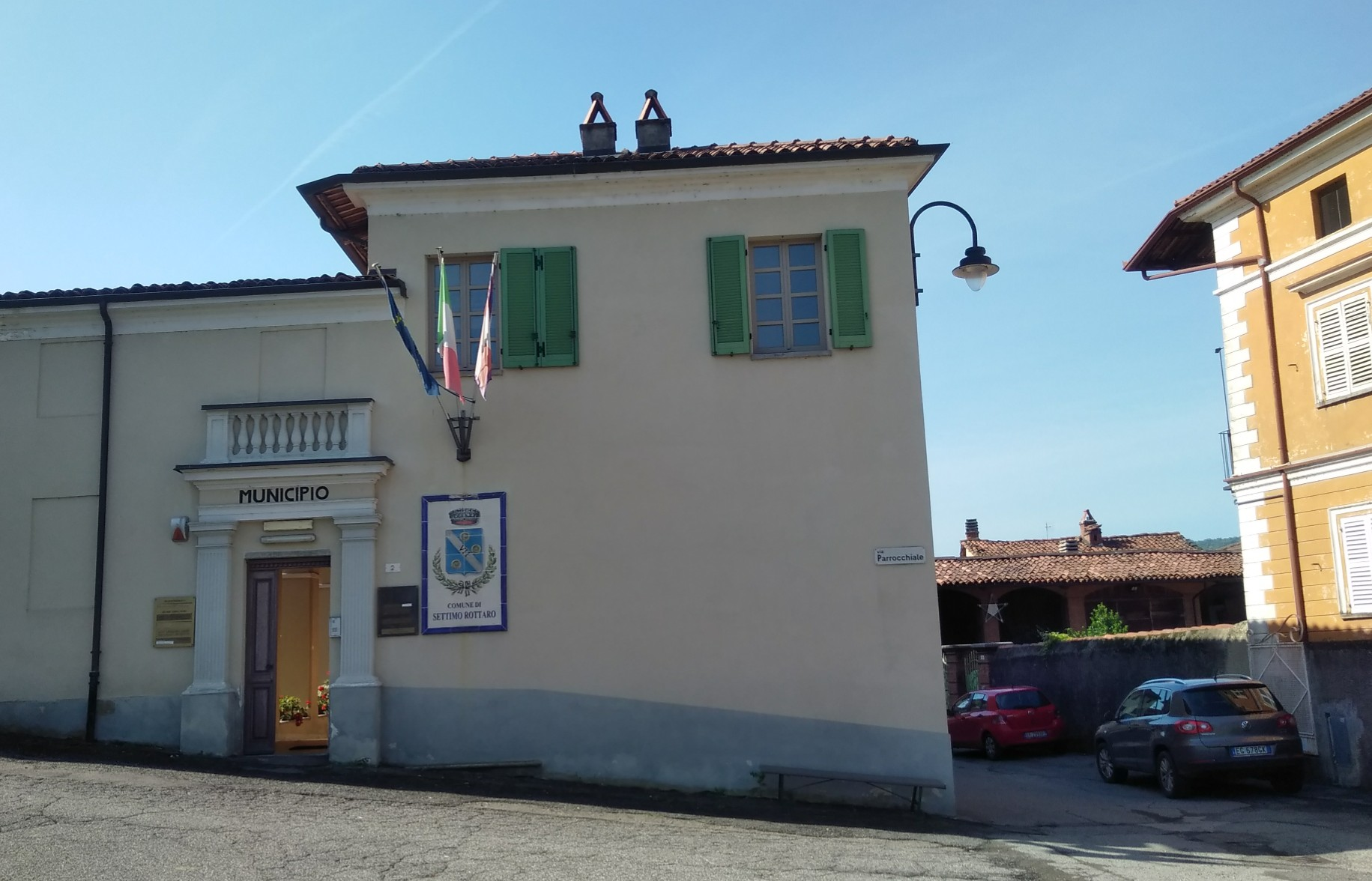
The town hall of Settimo Rottaro

The first documented traces of the town date back only to 1227, when the power of the church of Ivrea was affirmed; in that period, as soon as the experience of the free municipality ended, Settimo Rottaro was subject to the episcopal authority of Ivrea.

Protected by the Valperga and the nearby Masino Castle, the town was among the protagonists of the noble revolts of Canavese, often clashing with the San Martino, loyal to the House of Savoy; however, the town was conquered by Facino Cane in 1396, then annexed to Monferrato and left to the Lomello, already counts of Trino and Cavaglià. In 1431, the expansionist policy of the March of Montferrat clashed with the interests of the Duchy of Savoy. The latter, in 1432, obtained the territories to the left of the Po river, initially administered by Amadeus VIII of Savoy. The Valperga family also submitted to the latter, also helping to quell the popular revolts of the Tuchini, as also happened to the nearby Vestignè. Settimo Rottaro was then administered by the House of Savoy, until modern times.

In the 20th century, the town was famous for producing an excellent Erbaluce passito wine, from the homonymous vine, known in the Canavese area, however this tradition was lost. Instead, the traditional potato salami festival, a typical product, came to life on the first Sunday of February.

== Main sights ==
- Parish Church of Saint Bononio Abate Patron, from 1787, designed by the late Baroque architect Carlo Andrea Rana, and built on the ruins of the cell of the same name, south of the town, where Saint Bononio, abbot of Lucedio, retreated here to pray in the 11th century. The church was completed in 1790 and the following year the bell tower was built. The sacristy was added between 1868 and 1869; in 1974, in compliance with post-conciliar norms, the pulpit and the altar facing the assembly were built and in 2016 the roof was renovated.
- Church of the Confraternity of the Trinity, located in a more central position, on Commendator Vachino street.

== Demographics ==
Historical population

Year	Pop.	±%
1861	956	—
1871	942	−1.5%
1881	1,019	+8.2%
1901	1,067	+4.7%
1911	1,040	−2.5%
1921	985	−5.3%
1931	845	−14.2%
1936	840	−0.6%

Year	Pop.	±%
1951	716	−14.8%
1961	651	−9.1%
1971	613	−5.8%
1981	566	−7.7%
1991	543	−4.1%
2001	517	−4.8%
2011	503	−2.7%
2021	473	−6.0%

Istat historical data 1861–2011
