= Borgo d'Ale =

- Comune
- Comune di Borgo d'Ale
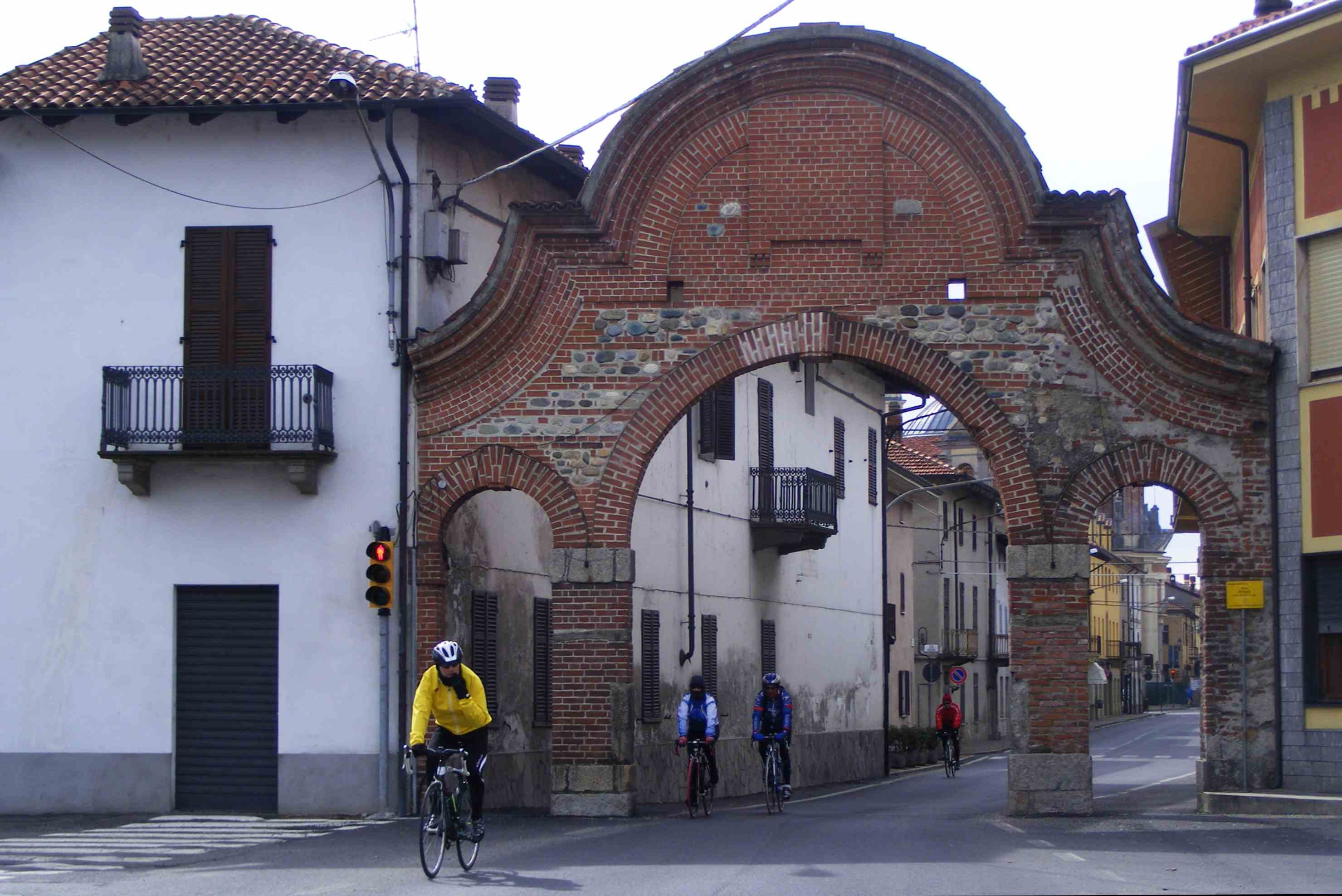

- Location within Italy Location within Piedmont
- Coordinates: 45°21′N 8°3′E
- Country: Italy
- Region: Piedmont
- Province: Province of Vercelli (VC)

Government
  - Mayor: Enrico Mario

Area
  - Total: 39.3 km^{2} (15.2 sq mi)

Population (Dec. 2004)
  - Total: 2,629
  - Density: 66.9/km^{2} (173/sq mi)
- Time zone: UTC+1 (CET)
  - Summer (DST): UTC+2 (CEST)
- Postal code: 13040
- Dialing code: 0161

Borgo d'Ale is a comune (municipality) in the Province of Vercelli in the Italian region Piedmont, located about 40 kilometres (25 mi) northeast of Turin and about 30 kilometres (19 mi) west of Vercelli. As of 31 December 2004, it had a population of 2,629 and an area of 39.3 square kilometres (15.2 mi^{2}).

Borgo d'Ale borders the following municipalities: Alice Castello, Azeglio, Bianzè, Borgomasino, Cossano Canavese, Maglione, Moncrivello, Settimo Rottaro, Tronzano Vercellese, and Viverone.

== Demographic evolution ==
Historical population

| Year | Pop. | ±% |
|---|---|---|
| 1861 | 3,387 | — |
| 1871 | 3,411 | +0.7% |
| 1881 | 3,723 | +9.1% |
| 1901 | 4,270 | +14.7% |
| 1911 | 3,953 | −7.4% |

| Year | Pop. | ±% |
|---|---|---|
| 1921 | 3,496 | −11.6% |
| 1931 | 3,496 | +0.0% |
| 1936 | 3,505 | +0.3% |
| 1951 | 3,245 | −7.4% |
| 1961 | 3,085 | −4.9% |

| Year | Pop. | ±% |
|---|---|---|
| 1971 | 2,981 | −3.4% |
| 1981 | 2,825 | −5.2% |
| 1991 | 2,685 | −5.0% |
| 2001 | 2,565 | −4.5% |

Source: Data from ISTAT
