= Cossano =

Cossano may refer to:

- Cossano Belbo, municipality in the Province of Cuneo in the Italian region Piedmont
- Cossano Canavese, municipality in the Metropolitan City of Turin in the Italian region Piedmont
