= San Martino Vescovo di Tours, Albiano d'Ivrea =

Roman Catholic church in Ivrea, Italy

San Martino Vescovo
- Chiesa di San Martino Vescovo (Italian)
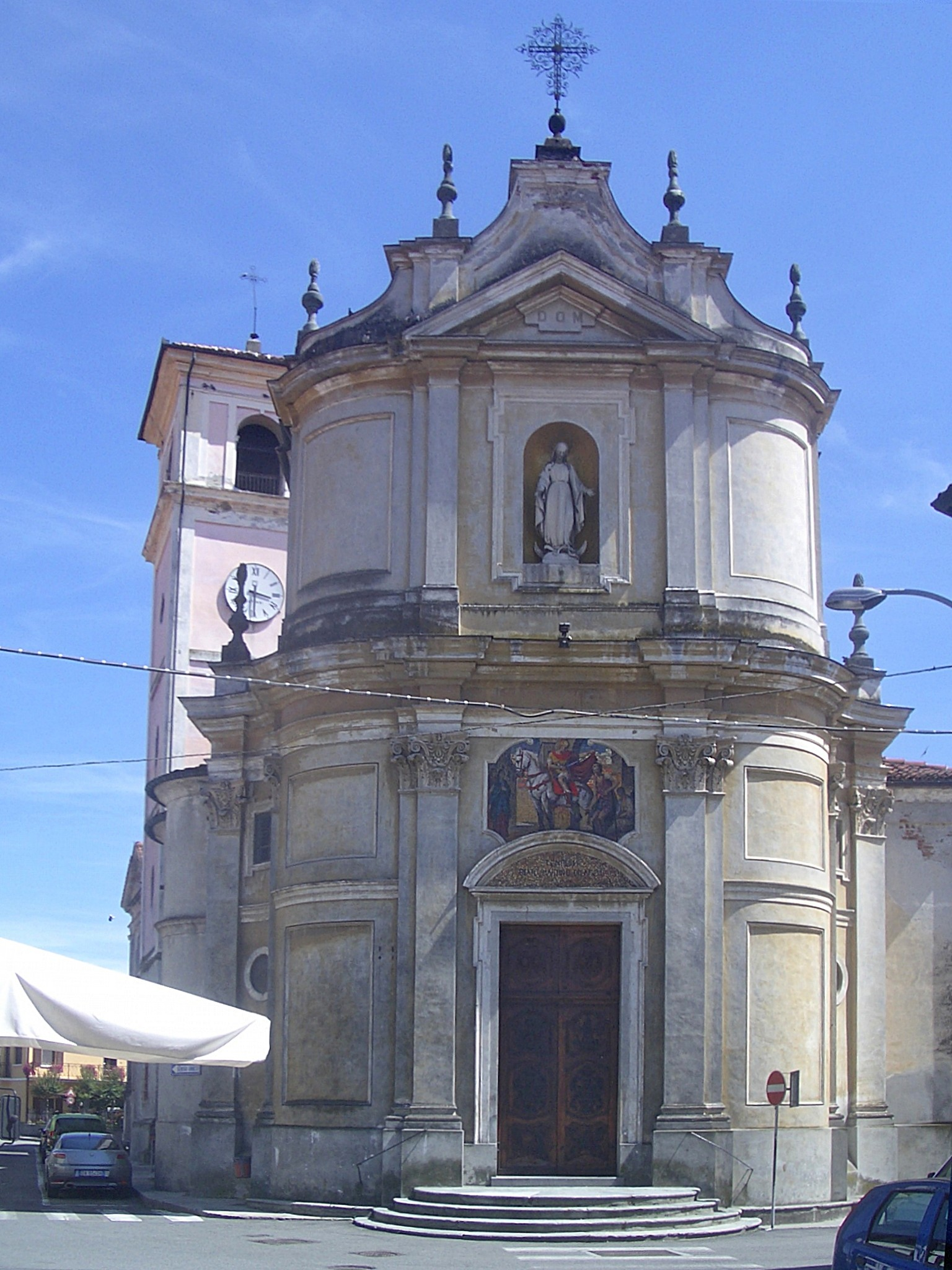
- San Martino Vescovo, Albiano d'Ivrea in 2009
- Click on the map for a fullscreen view
- 45°26′01.78″N 7°56′54.48″E
- Country: Italy
- Denomination: Roman Catholic

Architecture
- Functional status: Active
- Style: Romanesque architecture

Administration
- Archdiocese: Diocese of Ivrea

San Martino Vescovo di Tours is a Roman Catholic parish church, located in Albiano d'Ivrea in the Metropolitan City of Turin, region of Piedmont, northern Italy.

== History ==
A church at the site had been present putatively since the fourth century and later dedicated to St Martin of Tours.

The present church building was designed by Francesco Martinez of Messina, great-grandson of Filippo Juvarra, and built during 1775–1780. The bell-tower dates from the 13th century. It has only five bells since Napoleonic forces confiscated bells in excess of this number from campaniles for scrap metal to use in munitions.
