= Azeglio Castle =

- Castello di Azeglio
- Azeglio, Piedmont, Italy
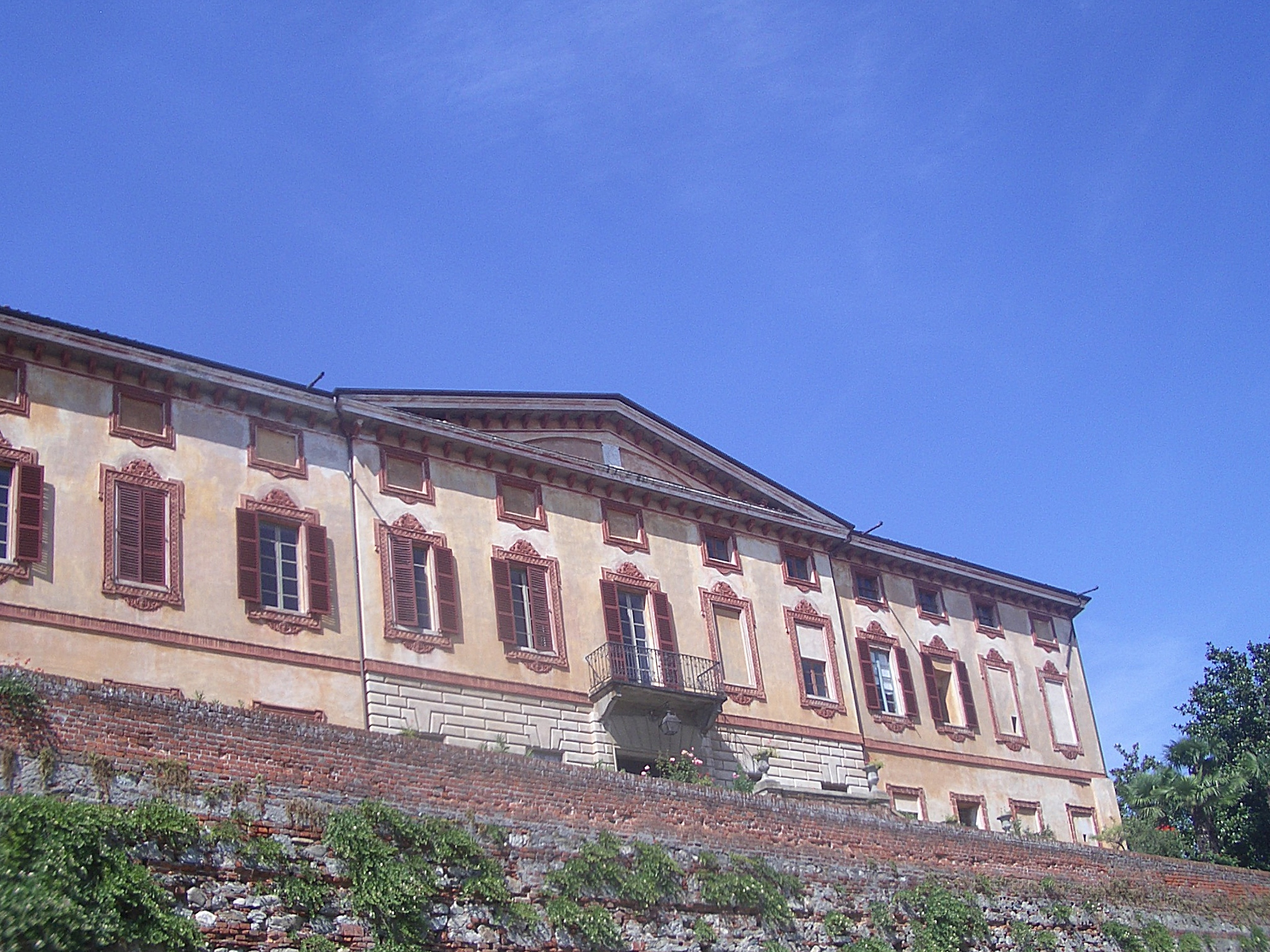
- Azeglio Castle

Site information
- Type: Castle

Location
- Location in Italy
- Coordinates: 45°25′29.92″N 7°59′37.57″E

Azeglio Castle (Italian: Castello di Azeglio) is a castle located in Azeglio, Piedmont, Italy.

== History ==
The origins of the castle are tied to the relocation of the settlement of Azeglio as a borgo franco to its current position, carried out by the authorities of Vercelli for military and defensive purposes.

The fief and castle originally belonged to the Ponzone family, then to the Tapparelli and d'Harcourt families, becoming their residence. Among their descendants, Massimo d'Azeglio, a prominent figure of the Risorgimento, owned the property in the 1830s, visiting with his wife Giulia Manzoni and writing the historical novel Ettore Fieramosca.

Subsequently, during the 19th century, under the d'Harcourt family, the castle took on its current appearance with the demolition of its medieval tower and the renovation of its façades, decorated with terracotta tiles designed by Ferdinando Cocito.

The castle was damaged by a fire in 1976 that destroyed its historic library. Some restoration works were completed in 2023.
