= Azeglio =

Azeglio Asèj (Piedmontese)
- Comune
- Comune di Azeglio
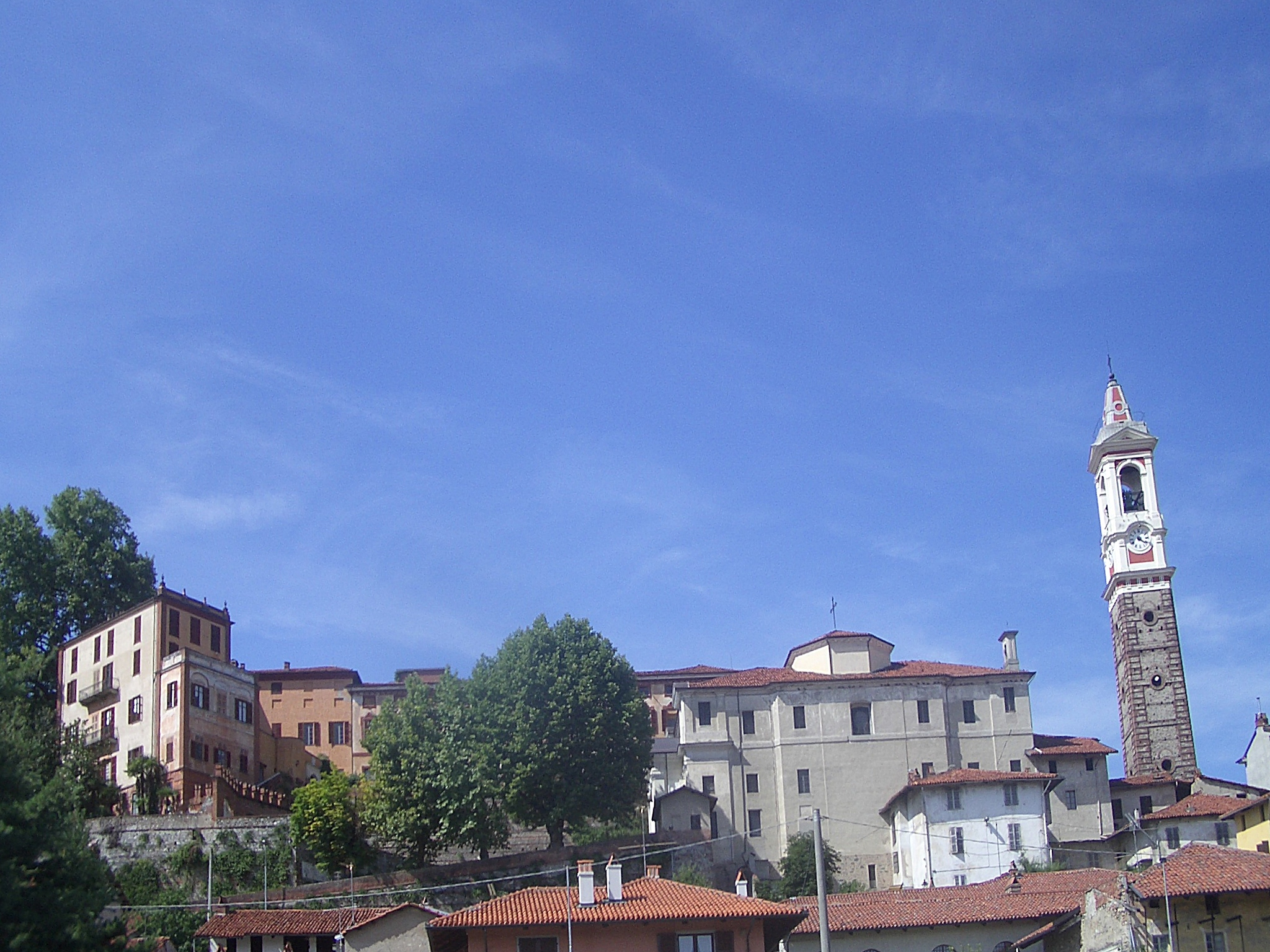

- Coat of arms

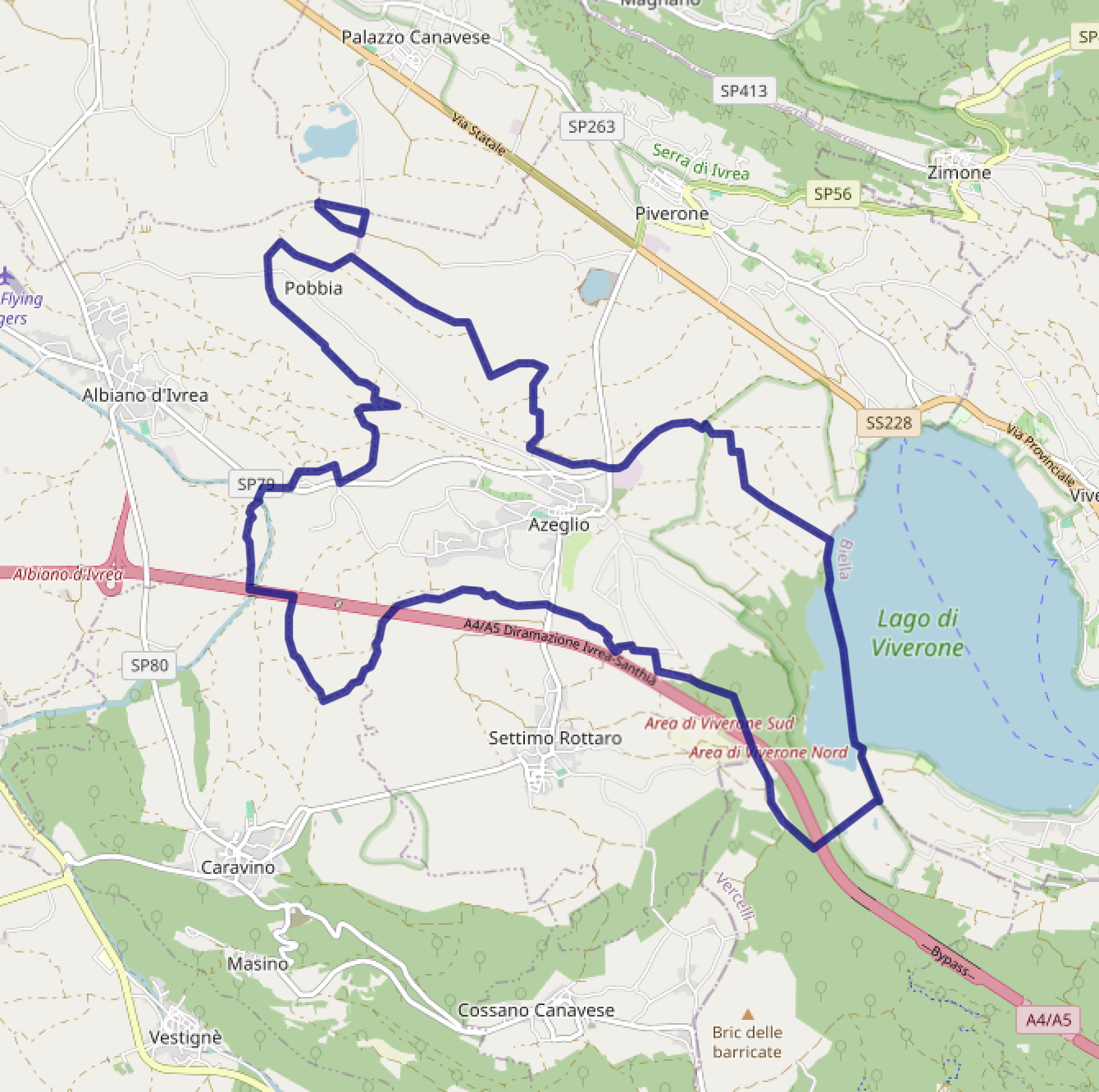
- OSM map.

- Location within Italy Location within Piedmont
- Coordinates: 45°25′N 8°0′E
- Country: Italy
- Region: Piedmont
- Metropolitan city: Turin (TO)
- Frazioni: Cascine Sirio, Cascine Viassa, Cascine Villa, Castellazzo, Lago di Viverone, Pobbia, Pobbietta, Specura

Government
  - Mayor: Pio Coda

Area
  - Total: 9.96 km^{2} (3.85 sq mi)
- Elevation: 260 m (850 ft)

Population (30 April 2017)
  - Total: 1,278
  - Density: 128/km^{2} (332/sq mi)
- Demonym: Azegliese/i
- Time zone: UTC+1 (CET)
  - Summer (DST): UTC+2 (CEST)
- Postal code: 10010
- Dialing code: 0125
- Website: Official website

Azeglio (Italian: [adˈdzɛʎʎo, adˈdzeʎʎo]; Piedmontese: Asèj [aˈzɛj]) is a comune (municipality) in the Metropolitan City of Turin in the Italian region Piedmont, located about 45 kilometres (28 mi) northeast of Turin.

Azeglio borders the following municipalities: Bollengo, Palazzo Canavese, Piverone, Albiano d'Ivrea, Viverone, Caravino, Settimo Rottaro, and Borgo d'Ale.

== Main sights ==
It is home to one or more prehistoric pile dwellings (or stilt house) settlements that are part of the Prehistoric pile dwellings around the Alps UNESCO World Heritage Site.

Main sights also include Azeglio Castle, located on a hilltop in the centre of the village.
