= Strambino =

- Comune
- Comune di Strambino
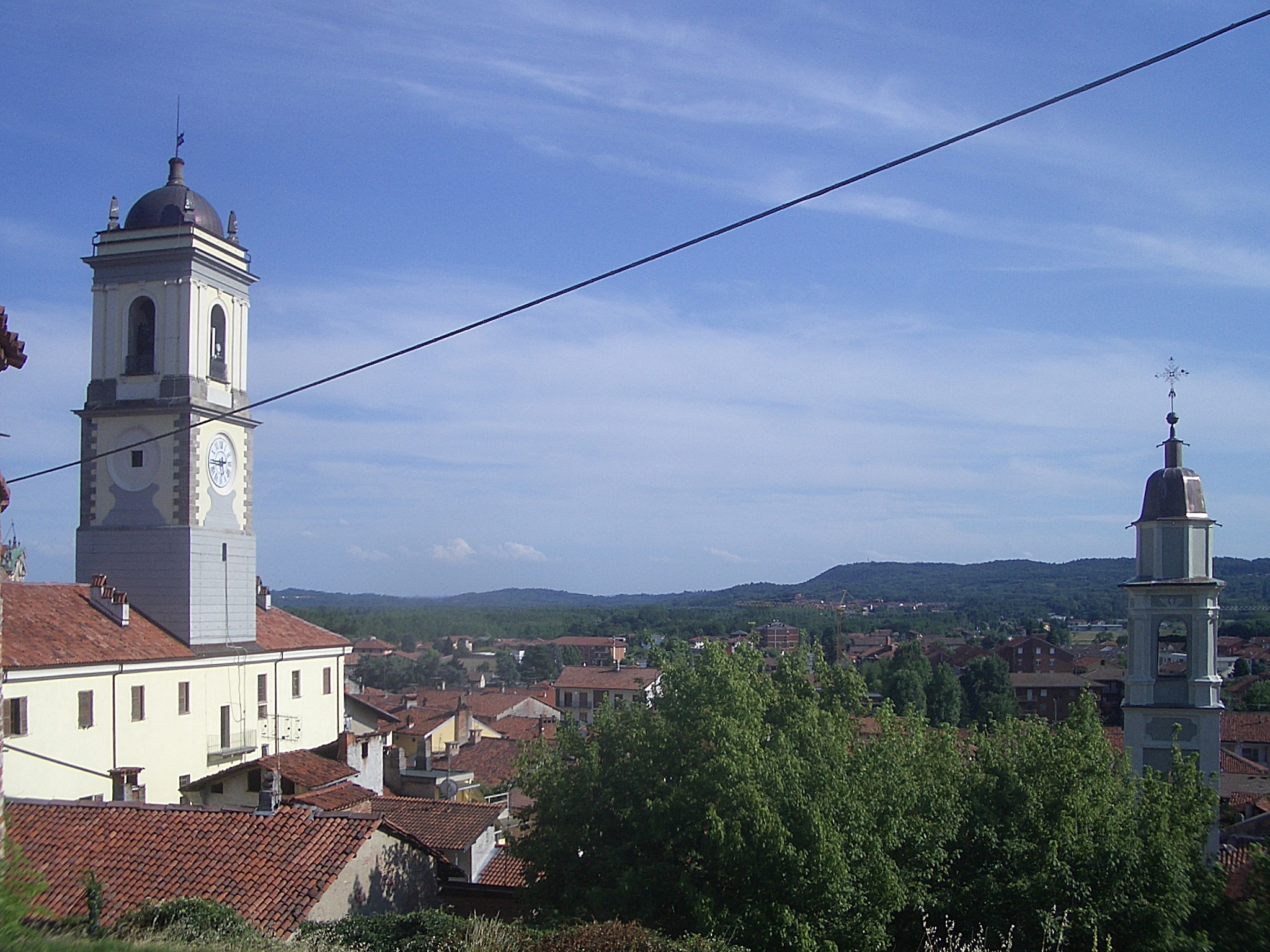

- Coat of arms

- Location within Italy Location within Piedmont
- Coordinates: 45°23′N 7°53′E
- Country: Italy
- Region: Piedmont
- Metropolitan city: Turin (TO)
- Frazioni: Cerone, Carrone, Crotte, Realizio

Government
  - Mayor: Sonia Cambursano

Area
  - Total: 22.7 km^{2} (8.8 sq mi)
- Elevation: 250 m (820 ft)

Population (Dec. 2004)
  - Total: 6,132
  - Density: 270/km^{2} (700/sq mi)
- Demonym: Strambinesi
- Time zone: UTC+1 (CET)
  - Summer (DST): UTC+2 (CEST)
- Postal code: 10019
- Dialing code: 0125
- Website: Official website

Strambino is a comune (municipality) in the Metropolitan City of Turin in the Italian region Piedmont, located about 40 kilometres (25 mi) northeast of Turin. As of 1 December 2021, it had a population of 6,132 and an area of 22.7 square kilometres (8.8 mi^{2}).

Strambino borders the following municipalities: Ivrea, Romano Canavese, Caravino, Vestignè, Mercenasco, Vische, and Candia Canavese.

The municipality comprises 4 frazioni: Cerone, Crotte, Carrone, Realizio.

== Main sights ==
- Strambino Castle, built from the 15th century on foundations dating back to the 11th century
- Strambino Town Hall, in Neoclassical style
- Parish church (mid-18th century)

== Twin towns ==
- Villa del Rosario, Argentina
