= Cossano Canavese =

Cossano Canavese Cusàn
- Comune
- Comune di Cossano Canavese
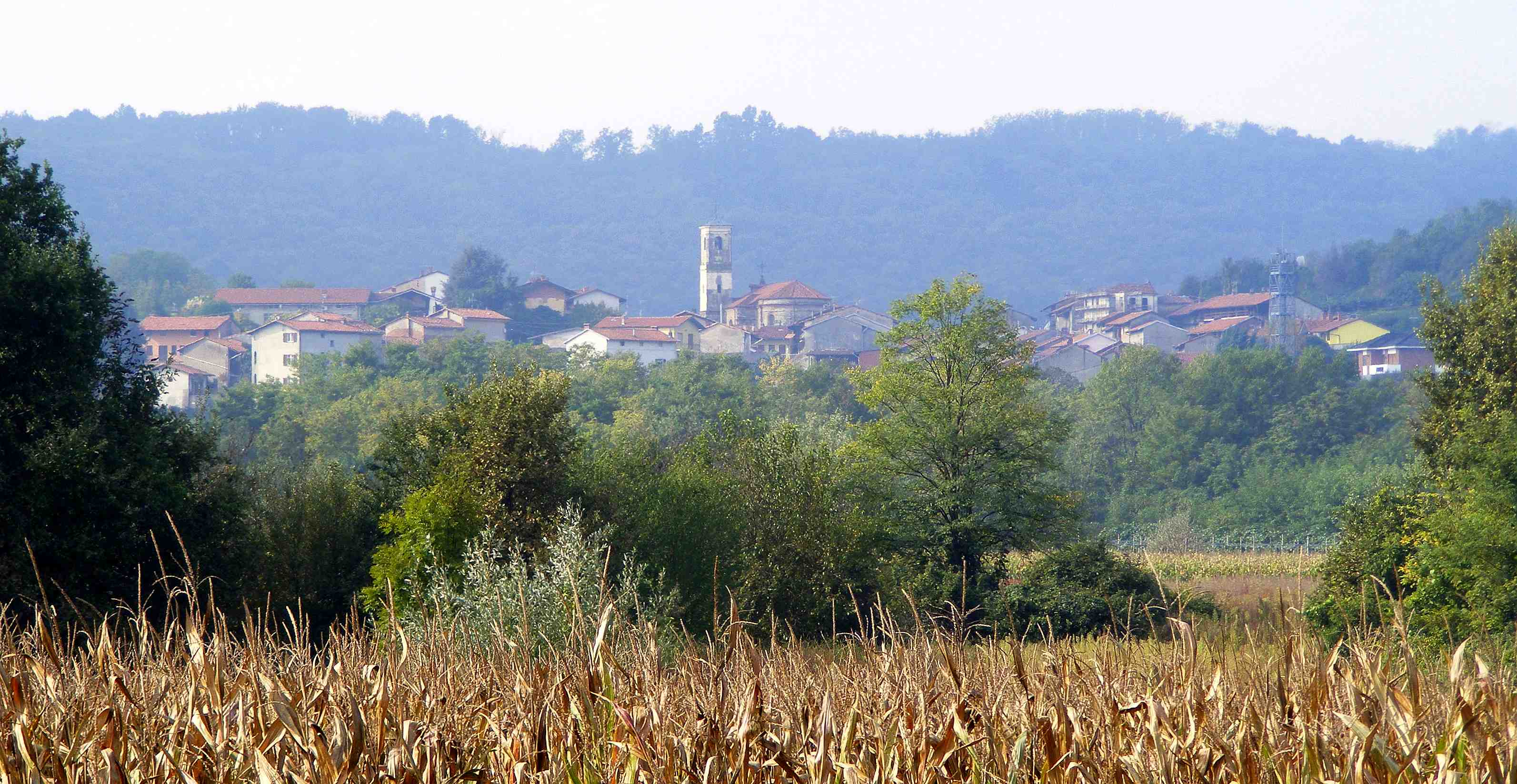

- Coat of arms

- Location within Italy Location within Piedmont
- Coordinates: 45°23′N 8°0′E
- Country: Italy
- Region: Piedmont
- Metropolitan city: Turin (TO)
- Frazioni: Avetta, Francia, Casale

Government
  - Mayor: Alberto Avetta

Area
  - Total: 3.3 km^{2} (1.3 sq mi)
- Elevation: 346 m (1,135 ft)

Population (31 December 2010)
  - Total: 528
  - Density: 160/km^{2} (410/sq mi)
- Demonym: Cossanesi
- Time zone: UTC+1 (CET)
  - Summer (DST): UTC+2 (CEST)
- Postal code: 10010
- Dialing code: 0125

Cossano Canavese is a comune (municipality) in the Metropolitan City of Turin in the Italian region Piedmont, located about 40 kilometres (25 mi) northeast of Turin.

Cossano Canavese borders the following municipalities: Caravino, Settimo Rottaro, Borgo d'Ale and Borgomasino.
