= Albiano d'Ivrea =

- Comune
- Comune di Albiano d'Ivrea
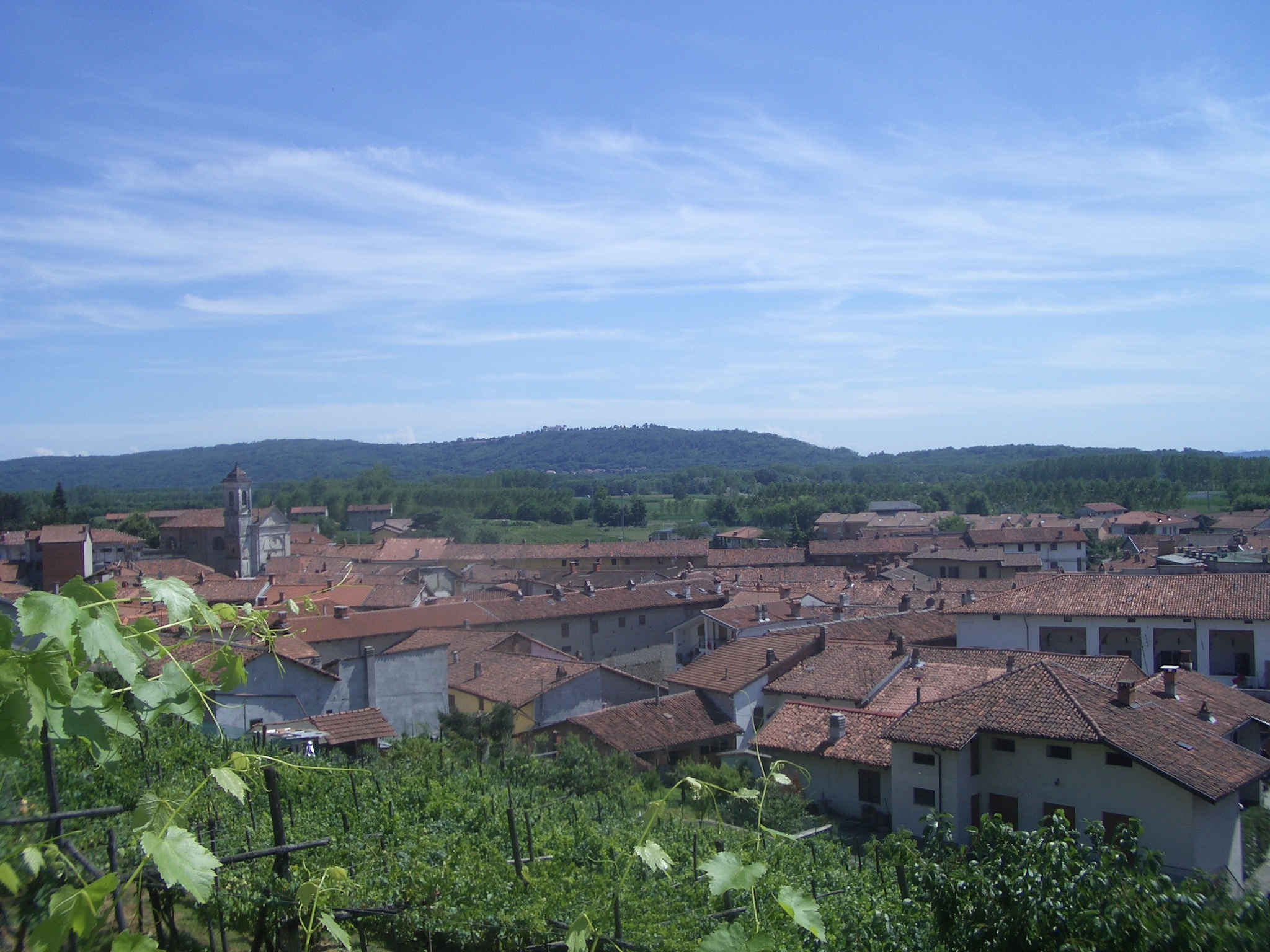

- Coat of arms

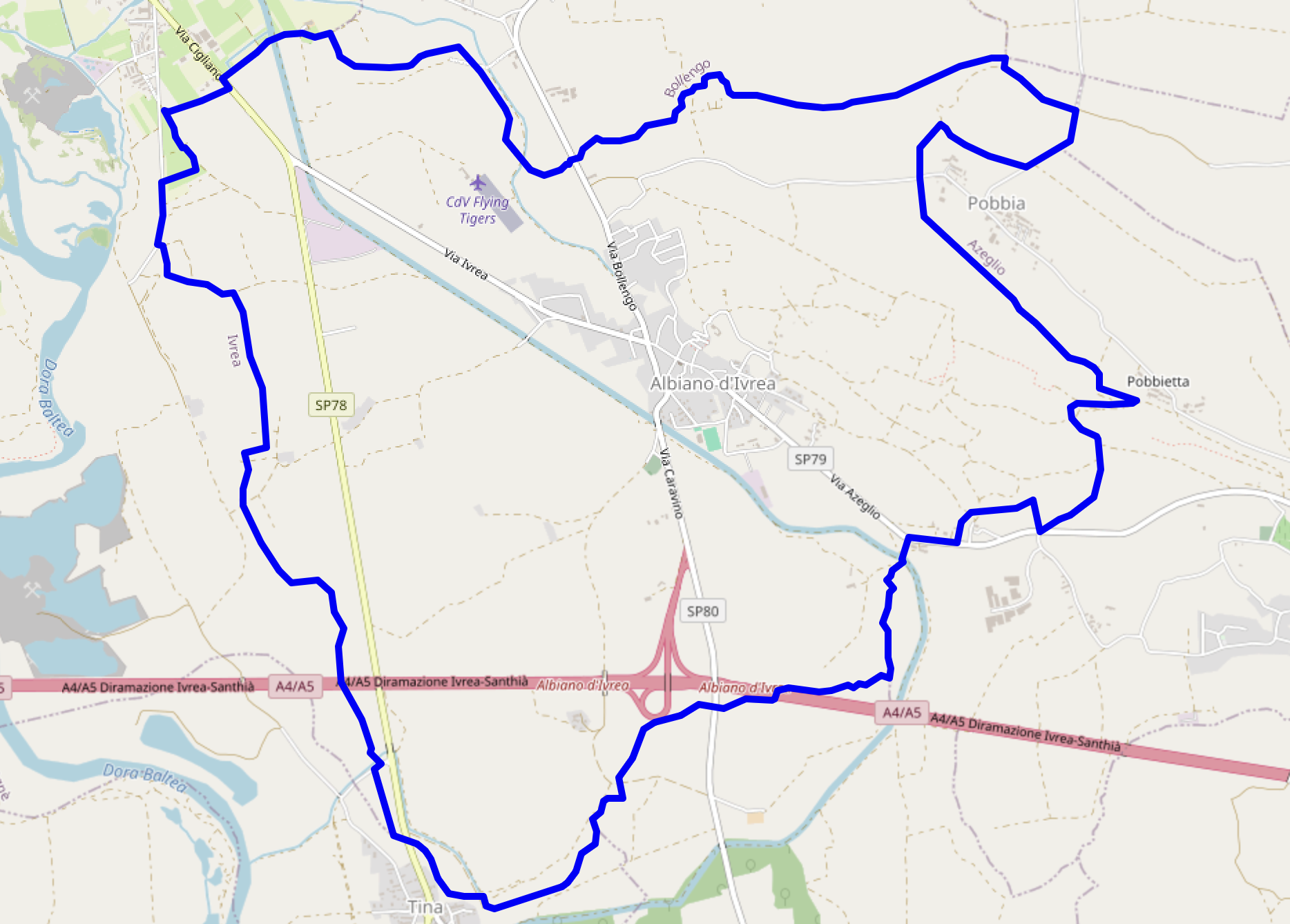

- Location of Albiano d'Ivrea in Italy Albiano d'Ivrea (Piedmont)
- Coordinates: 45°26′N 7°57′E
- Country: Italy
- Region: Piedmont
- Metropolitan city: Turin (TO)

Government
  - Mayor: Gildo Marcelli

Area
  - Total: 11.73 km^{2} (4.53 sq mi)
- Elevation: 230 m (750 ft)

Population (30 April 2017)
  - Total: 1,679
  - Density: 143.1/km^{2} (370.7/sq mi)
- Demonym: Albianesi
- Time zone: UTC+1 (CET)
  - Summer (DST): UTC+2 (CEST)
- Postal code: 10010
- Dialing code: 0125
- Patron saint: St. Martin
- Saint day: 11 November
- Website: Official website

Albiano d'Ivrea (Piedmontese: Albian) is a comune (municipality) in the Metropolitan City of Turin in the Italian region Piedmont, located about 45 kilometres (28 mi) northeast of Turin.

Albiano d'Ivrea borders the following municipalities: Bollengo, Ivrea, Palazzo Canavese, Piverone, Azeglio, Caravino, and Vestignè.

The Baroque church of San Martino Vescovo di Tours, as well as the Albiano d'Ivrea Castle, are located in the village.

== Geography ==
The village is located on the left bank of the Naviglio di Ivrea, nestled at the foot of low hills running parallel to the larger left moraine ridge of the Serra d'Ivrea up to Lake Viverone.

== Economy ==
The economy is mostly based on cereals and forage production.
