= Strambino Town Hall =

- Palazzo Comunale di Strambino (Italian)
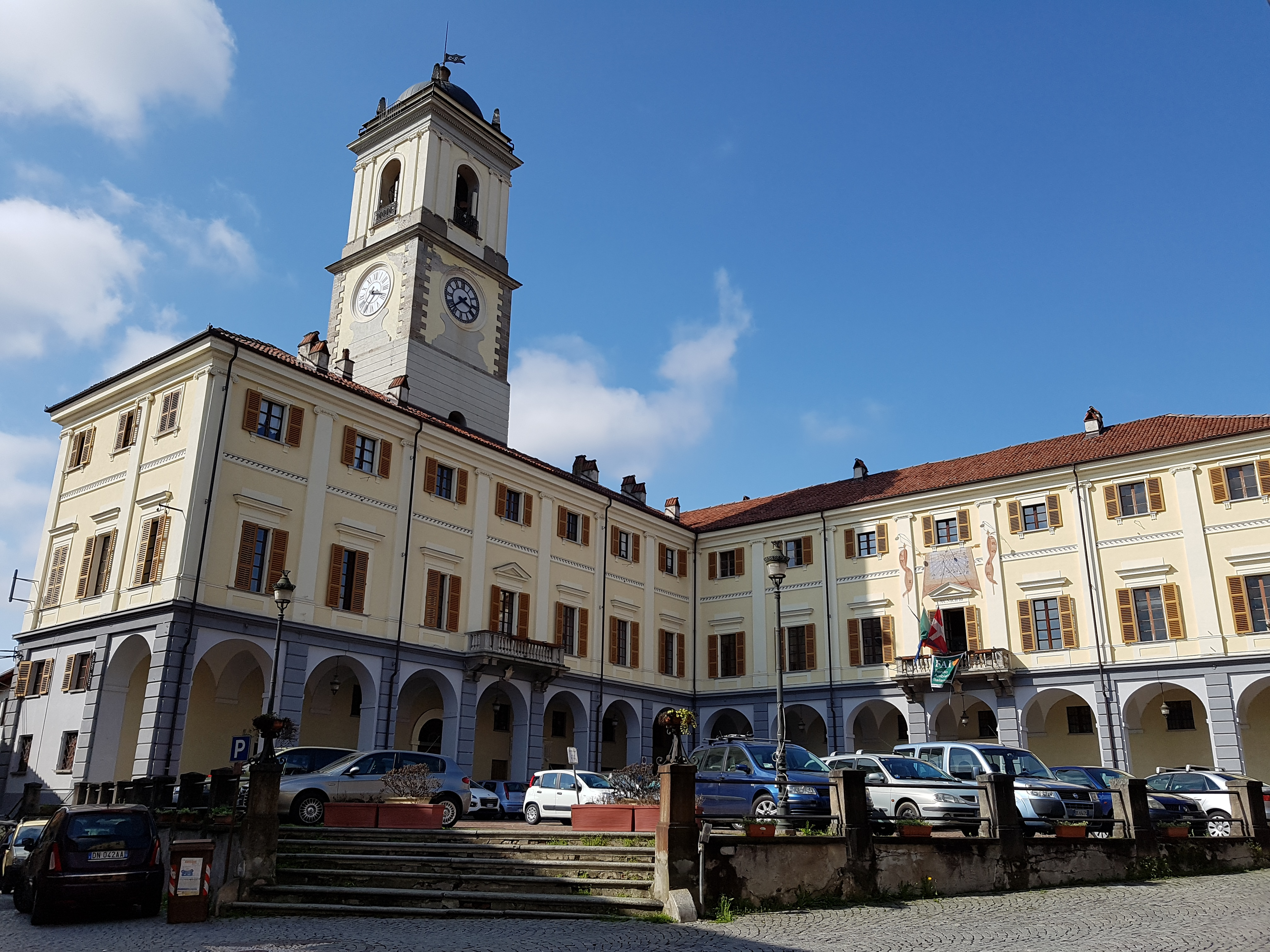
- Strambino Town Hall in 2017
- Click on the map for a fullscreen view

General information
- Location: Strambino, Italy
- Coordinates: 45°23′04.6″N 7°52′49.9″E

The Strambino Town Hall (Italian: Palazzo Comunale di Strambino) is the town hall of the town and comune of Strambino in Italy.

== History ==
The design of the building, attributed to Francesco Martelli, dates back to 1819. However, the building was only completed in 1862.

The first wing, extending longitudinally and forming the western side of the square facing the building, was the first to be completed. It was not a new construction but rather an expansion and adaptation of some pre-existing buildings, which were purposefully purchased by the municipality.

The second wing of the palace was erected between 1845 and 1847; during the same period, stucco artists and painters decorated some of the building's interior rooms.

In this phase, the bell tower only reached the roof level. Later, in 1862, it was raised some additional 25 meters, and in 1865, it was equipped with the bells coming from a nearby clock tower.

== Description ==
The building features a Neoclassical style.

== Gallery ==
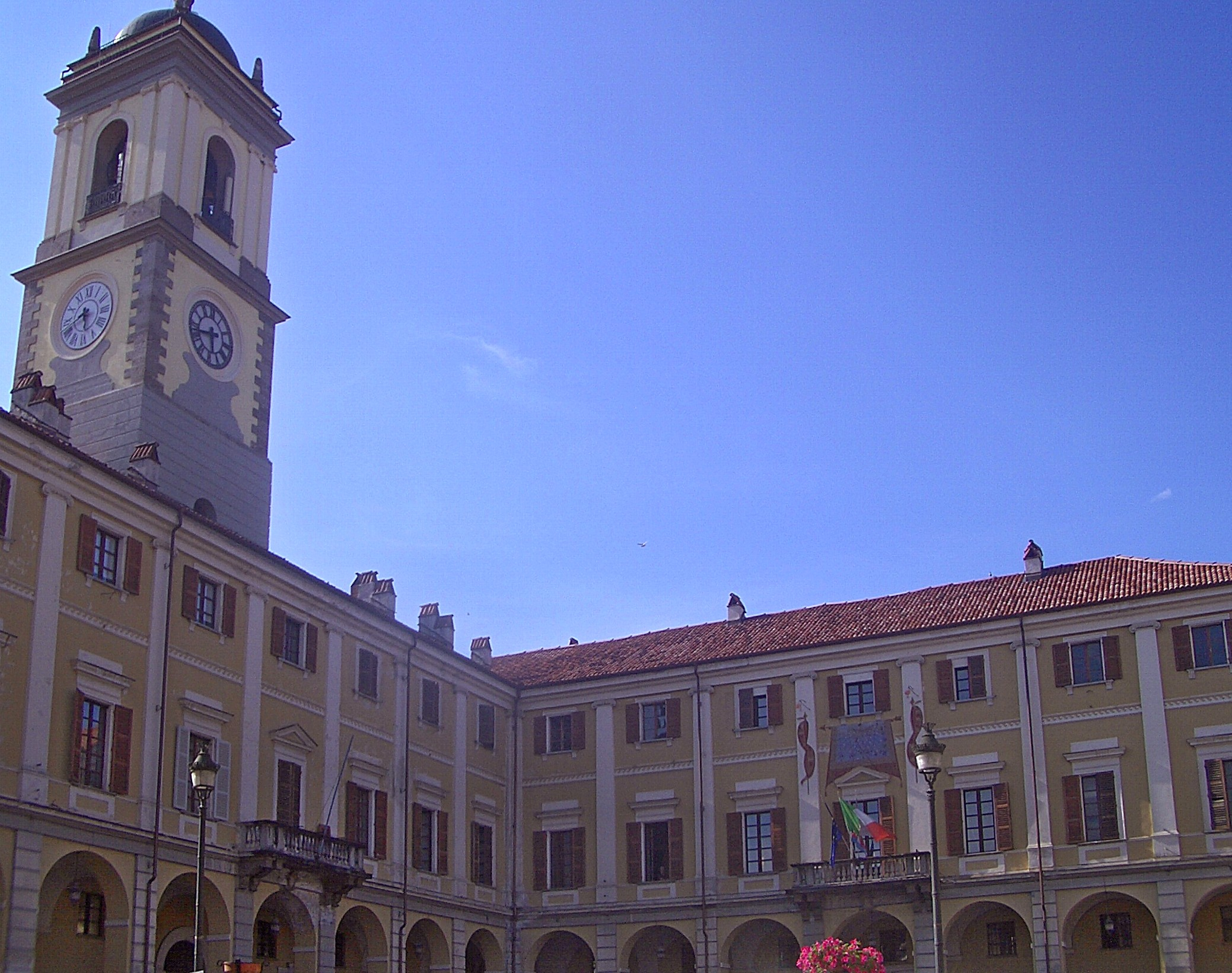

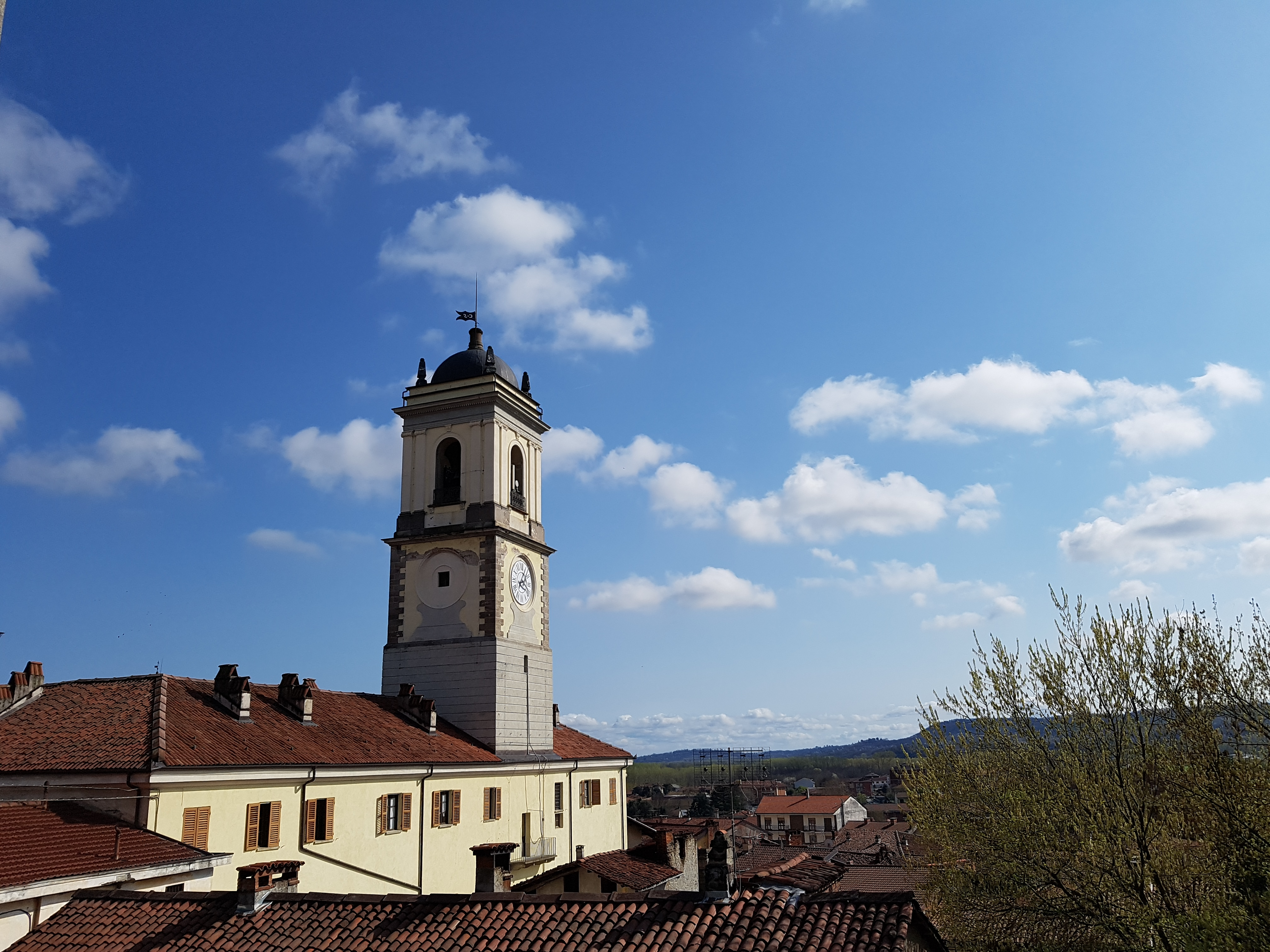

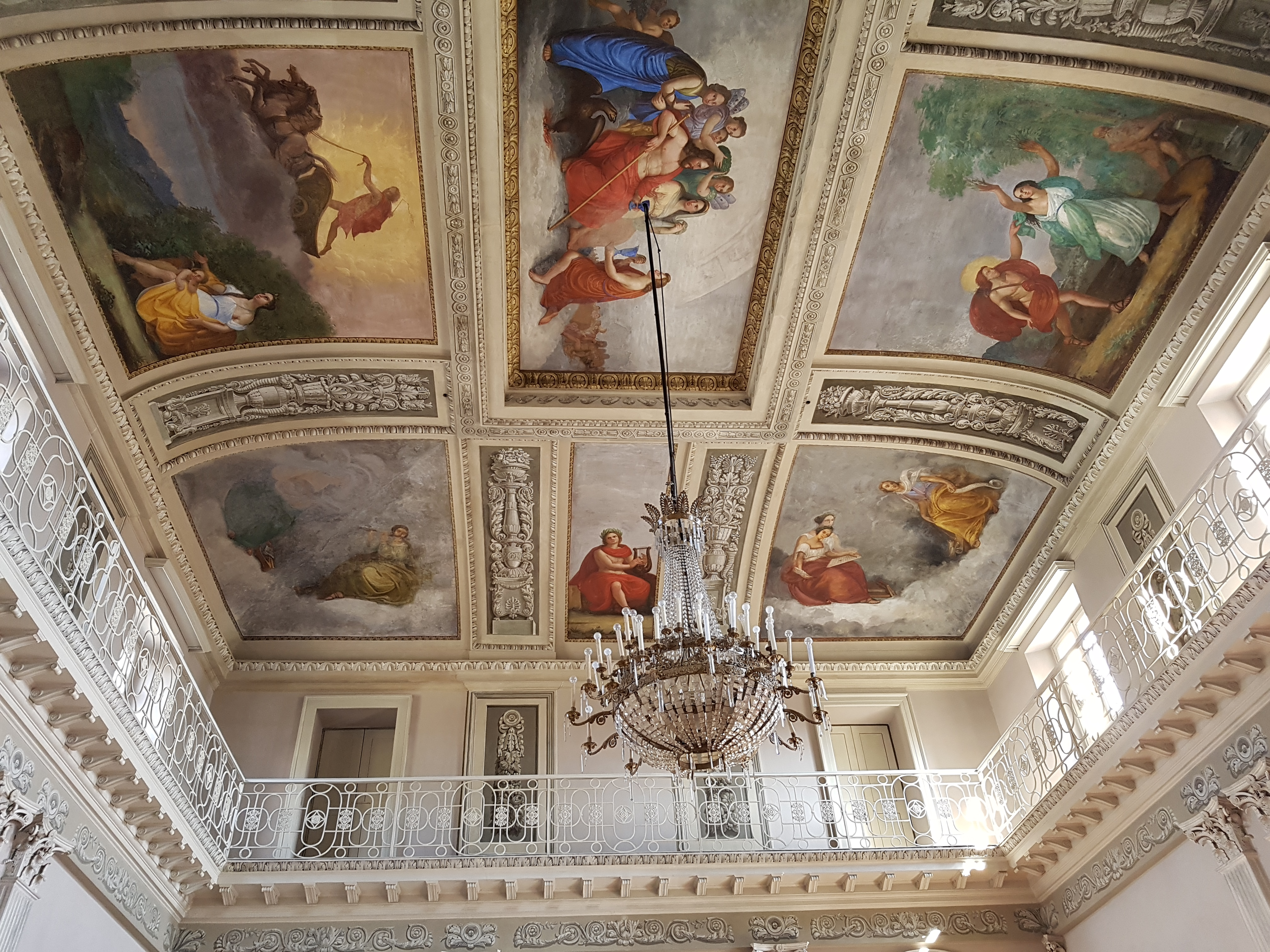
