= Vestignè =

- Comune
- Comune di Vestignè
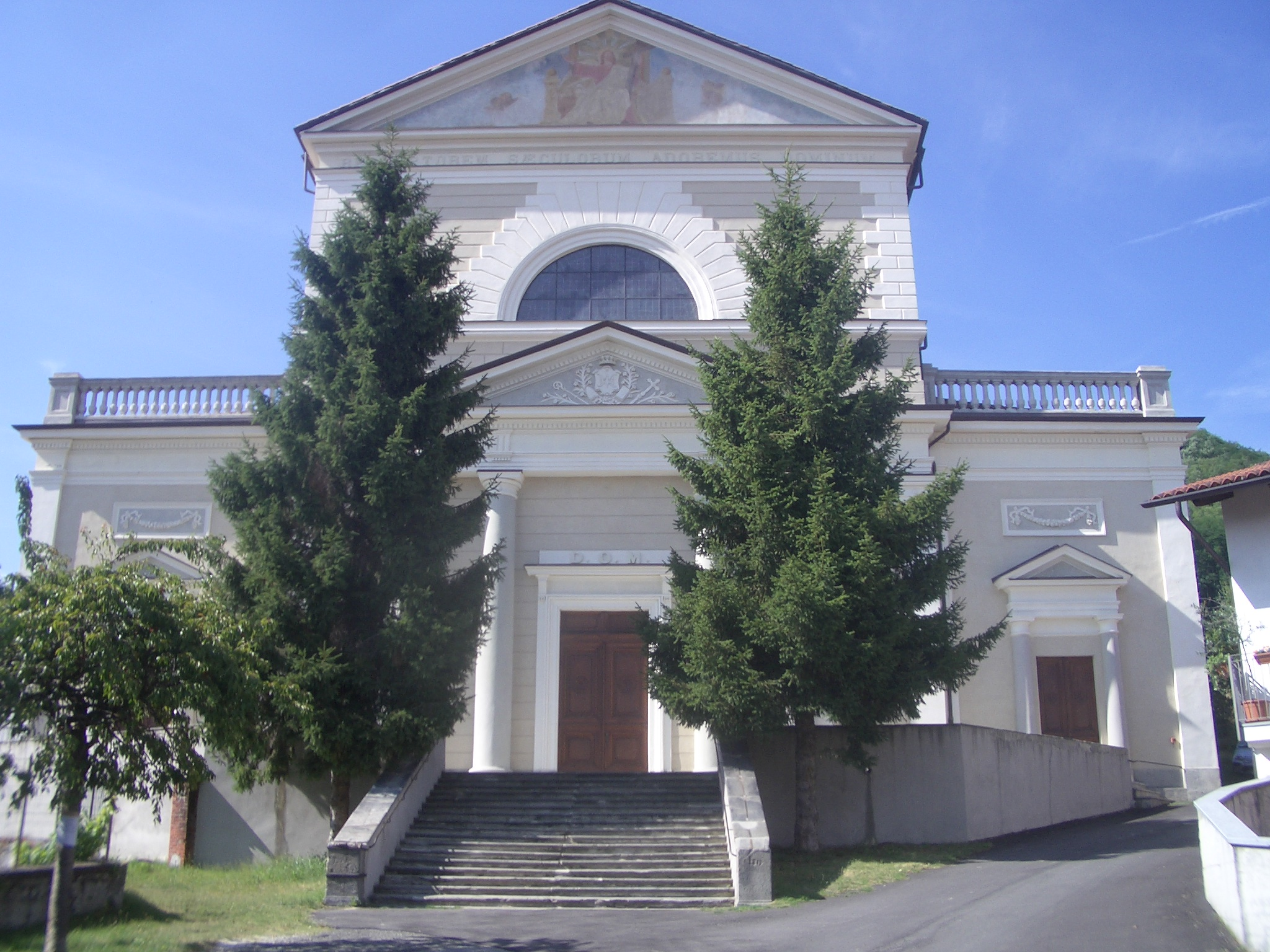
- Parish church of Vestignè

- Coat of arms

- Location within Italy Location within Piedmont
- Coordinates: 45°23′N 7°57′E
- Country: Italy
- Region: Piedmont
- Metropolitan city: Turin (TO)

Government
  - Mayor: Alessandro Albino

Area
  - Total: 12.1 km^{2} (4.7 sq mi)

Population (31 December 2010)
  - Total: 834
  - Density: 68.9/km^{2} (179/sq mi)
- Demonym: Vestignesi
- Time zone: UTC+1 (CET)
  - Summer (DST): UTC+2 (CEST)
- Postal code: 10030
- Dialing code: 0125
- Patron saint: St. Germanus
- Saint day: First Sunday in September
- Website: Official website

Vestignè is a comune (municipality) in the Metropolitan City of Turin in Piedmont, northern Italy, located about 40 km northeast of Turin.

Vestignè borders the following municipalities: Ivrea, Albiano d'Ivrea, Strambino, Caravino, Borgomasino, and Vische. It occupies a hilly territory in the central-eastern lower Canavese geographical area.
