= Borgomasino Castle =

- Castello di Borgomasino
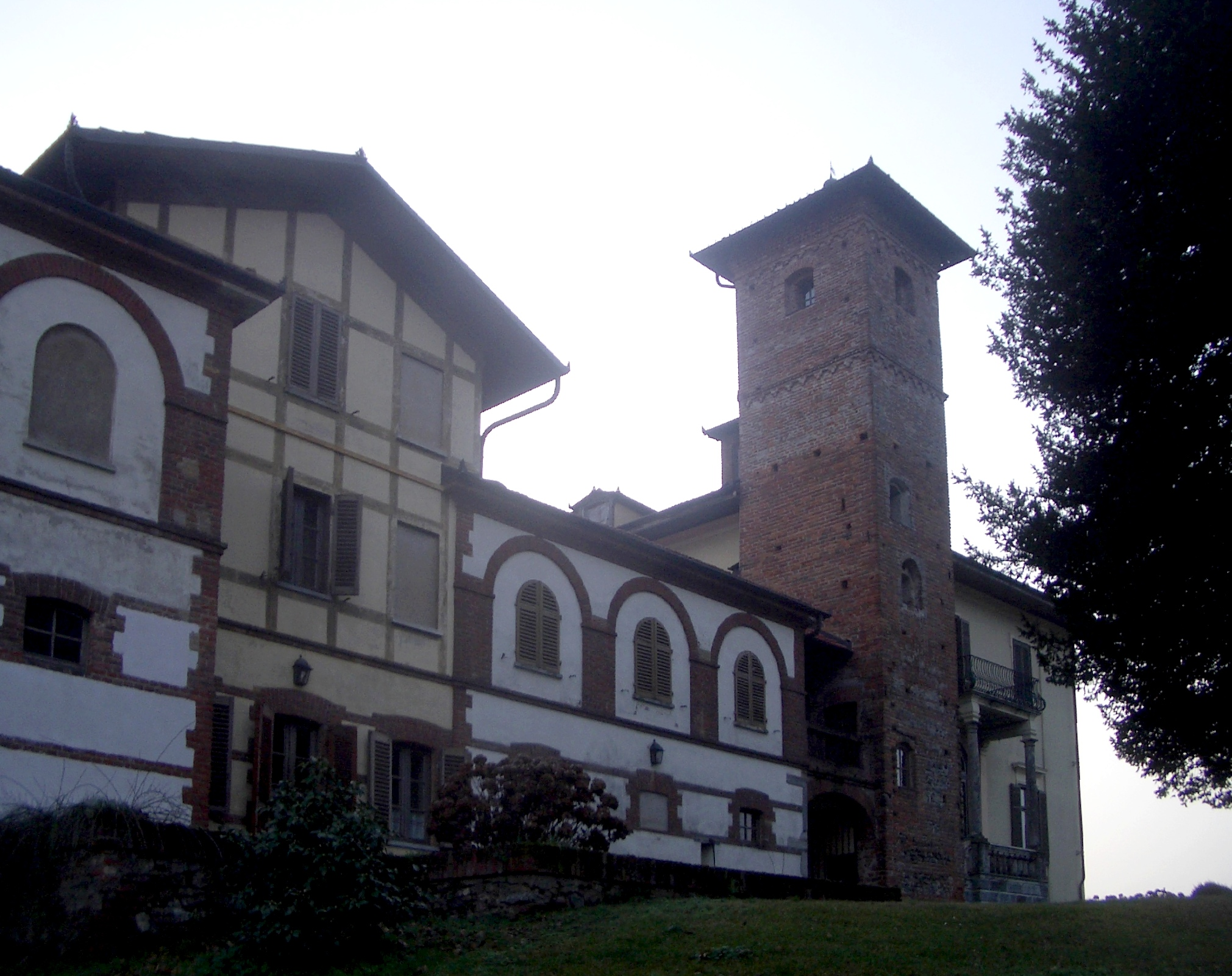
- Borgomasino Castle in 2007
- Click on the map for a fullscreen view

General information
- Location: Borgomasino, Italy
- Coordinates: 45°21′40.77″N 7°59′14.19″E

Borgomasino Castle (Italian: Castello di Borgomasino) is a castle located in Borgomasino, Piedmont, Italy.

== History ==
Records attest to existence of the castle as early as the 11th century, when it was built by Guido, Count of Pombia. Located on the border between Ivrea and Vercelli, the castle served a defensive purpose and was often at the center of conflicts between the two territories. In 1361, Bartolomeo di Masino ceded the village of Borgomasino to Amadeus of Savoy, while retaining control of the castle, which was later fortified due to tensions with the House of Savoy. By the late 14th century, the Counts of Masino were enfeoffed and adopted the title Counts of Masino of Borgomasino.

The castle, owned by the Counts of Valperga since the 15th century, was damaged by a collapse in 1818. On its ruins, in the 1870s, a noble villa was constructed. The architect Siniscalchi was commissioned by the then mayor of Turin, Count Luigi Valperga di Masino.

== Description ==
Of the ancient castle, the square-plan tower that once overlooked the Castrum vetus, the courtyard of arms, and the nearby rustic buildings still remain. The brick tower features irregular openings and terracotta decorations that adorn the top floor and the edge below the roof. The park in front overlooks the Ivrea canal and offers a scenic view of the nearby Ivrea moraine hill.
