= Masino Castle =

Castle in Piedmont, Italy

- Castello di Masino
- Caravino, Piedmont, Italy
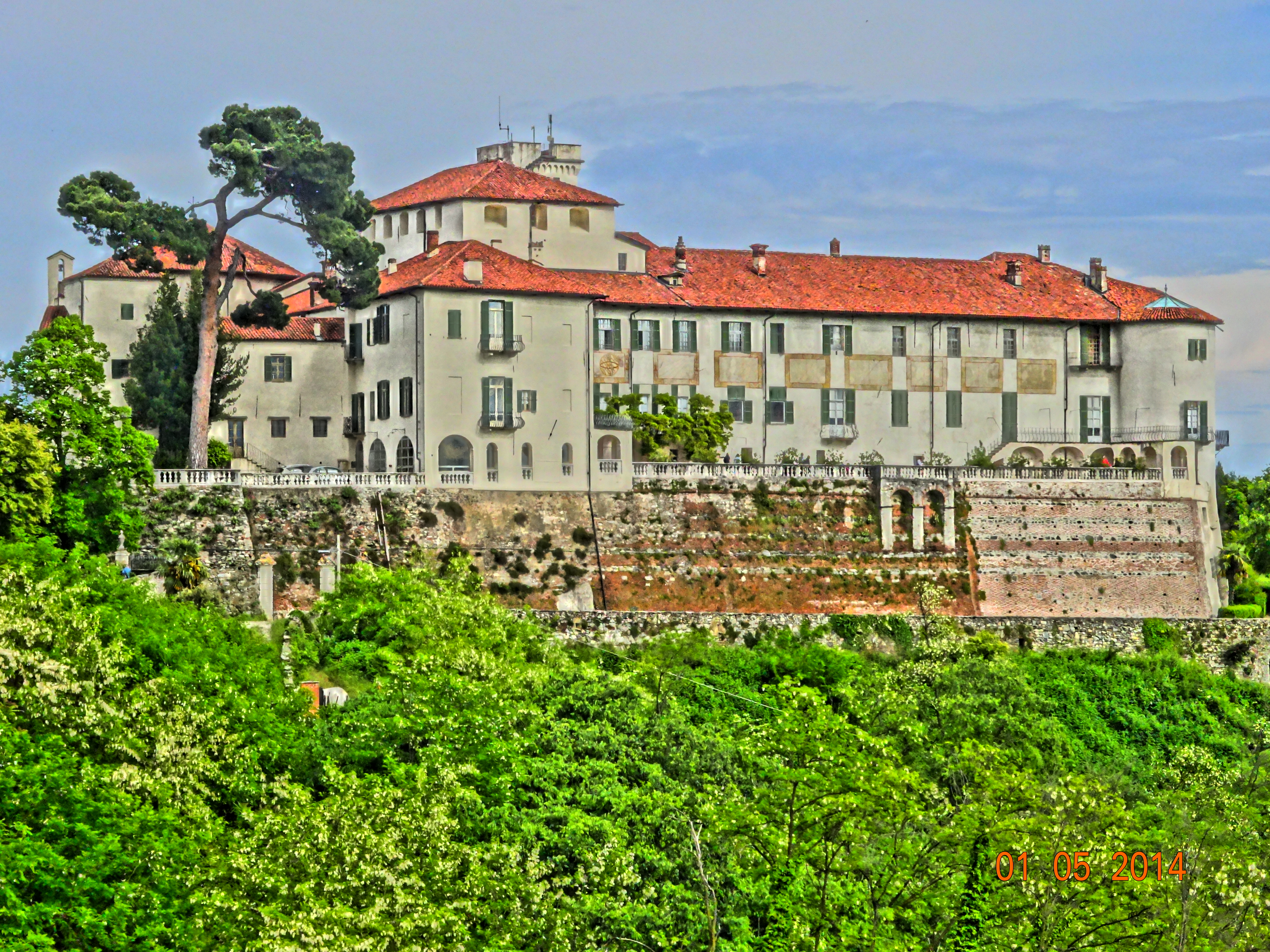
- Masino Castle

Site information
- Type: Castle
- Owner: Fondo Ambiente Italiano
- Open to the public: Yes

Location
- Location in Italy
- Coordinates: 45°23′31″N 7°57′34″E

Masino Castle (Italian: Castello di Masino) is a hill-top castle located in Caravino, Italy.

== History ==
The castle's existence is documented as far back as 1070. Its original owner was the Valperga dynasty, which, legend has it, were descended from Arduino, the first king of Italy. Due to its strategic location, the castle was besieged and damaged several times throughout its existence, including by the House of Savoy in the 15th century, by the French in the 16th century, and by the Spanish in the 17th century. The castle was later converted into an aristocratic residence.

In 1988, the property was acquired by the Fondo Ambiente Italiano.

== Description ==
The castle lies on the top of a morainic relief rising from the Ivrea Plain at the foothills of the Alps. The property includes extensive gardens.

The structure features a quadrangular plan with an imposing keep.

== Gallery ==
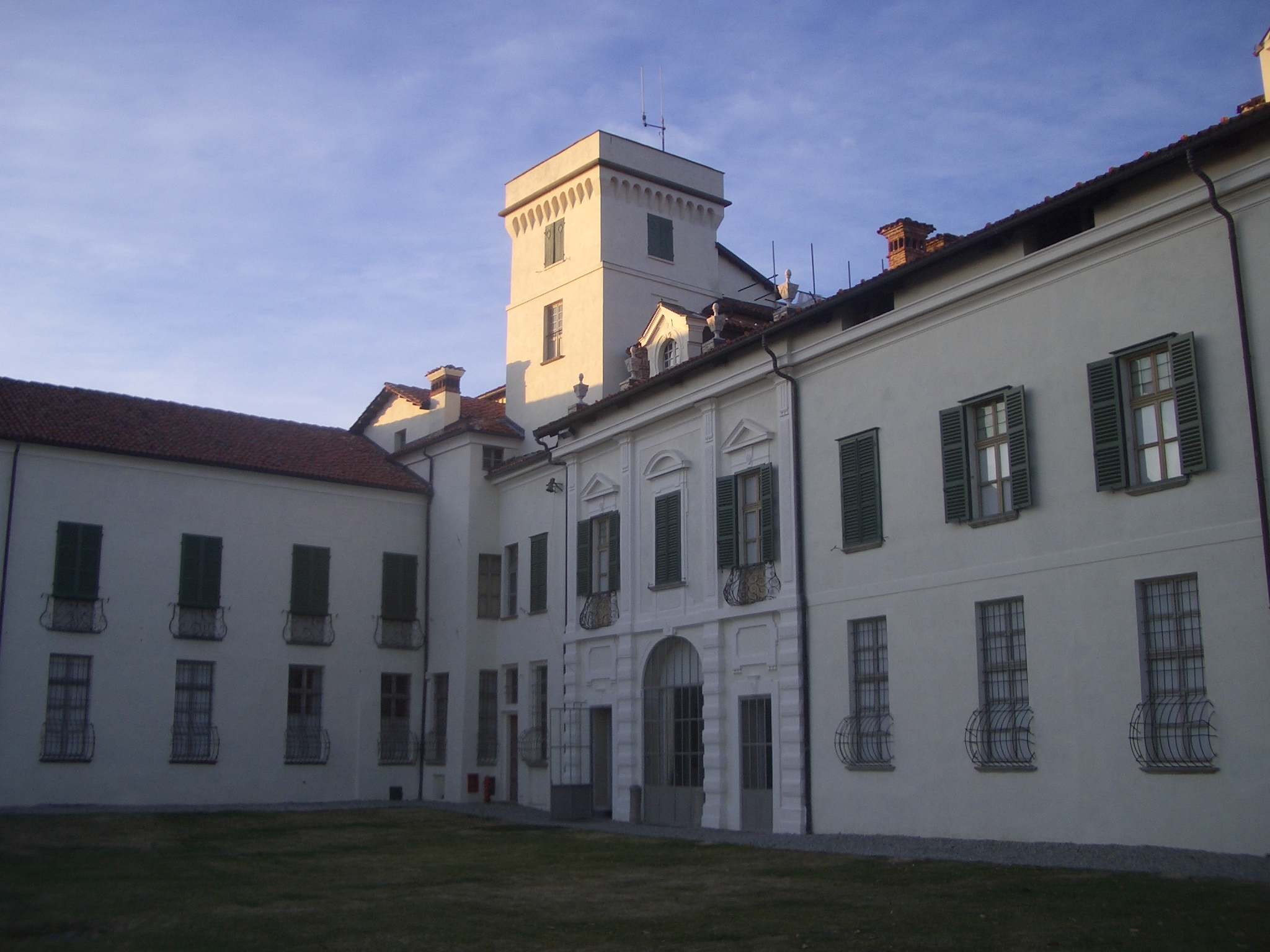

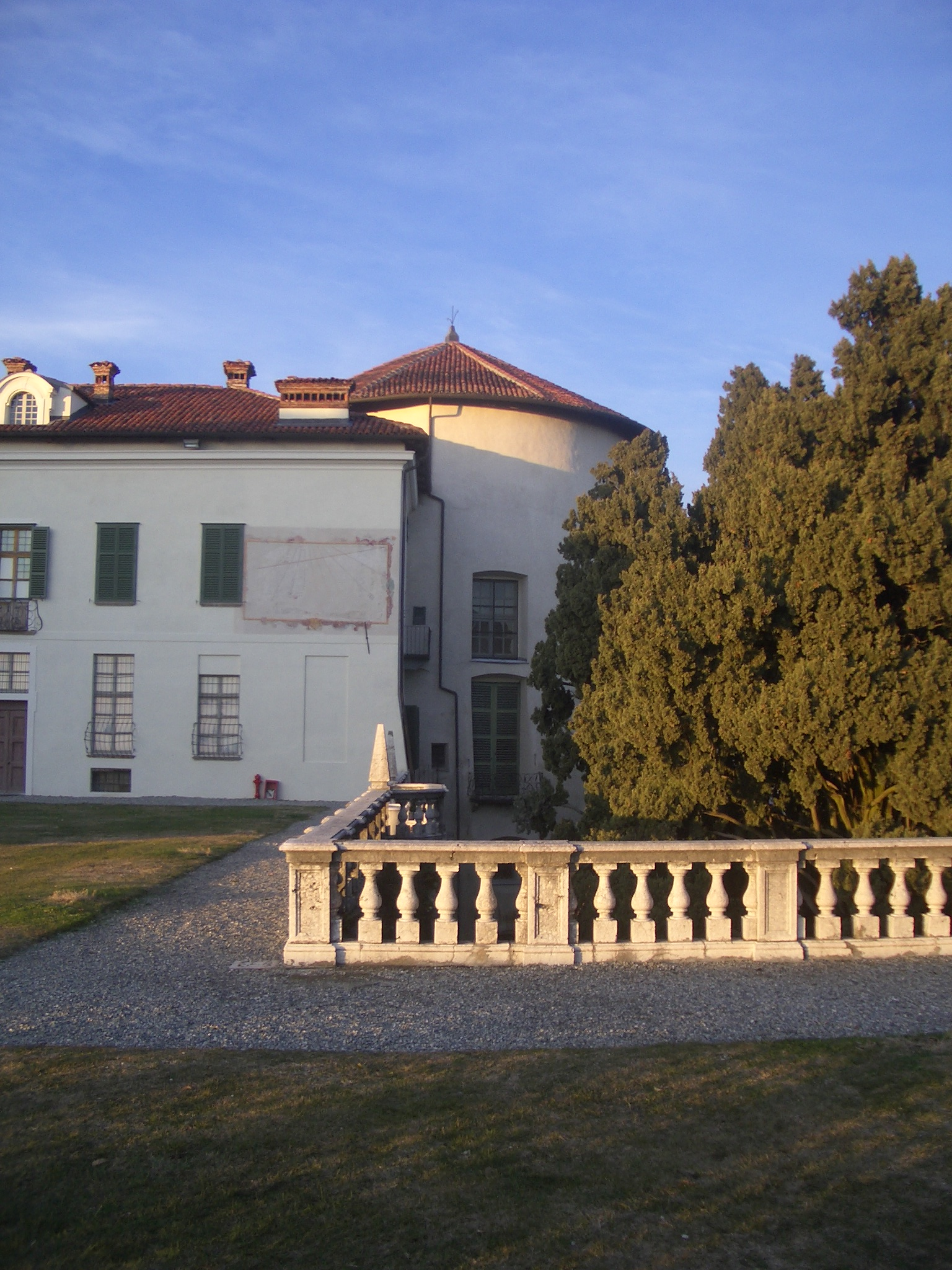

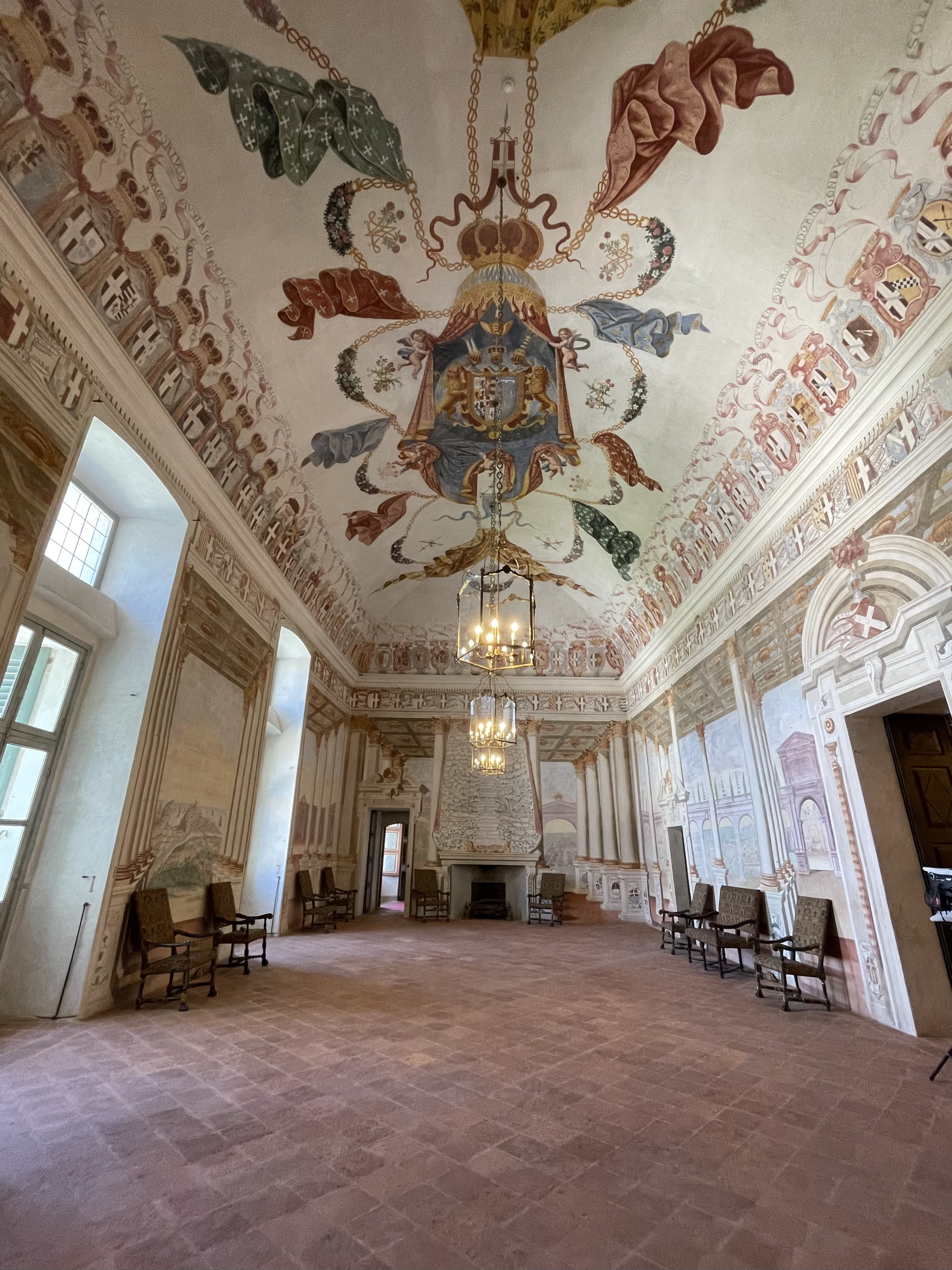

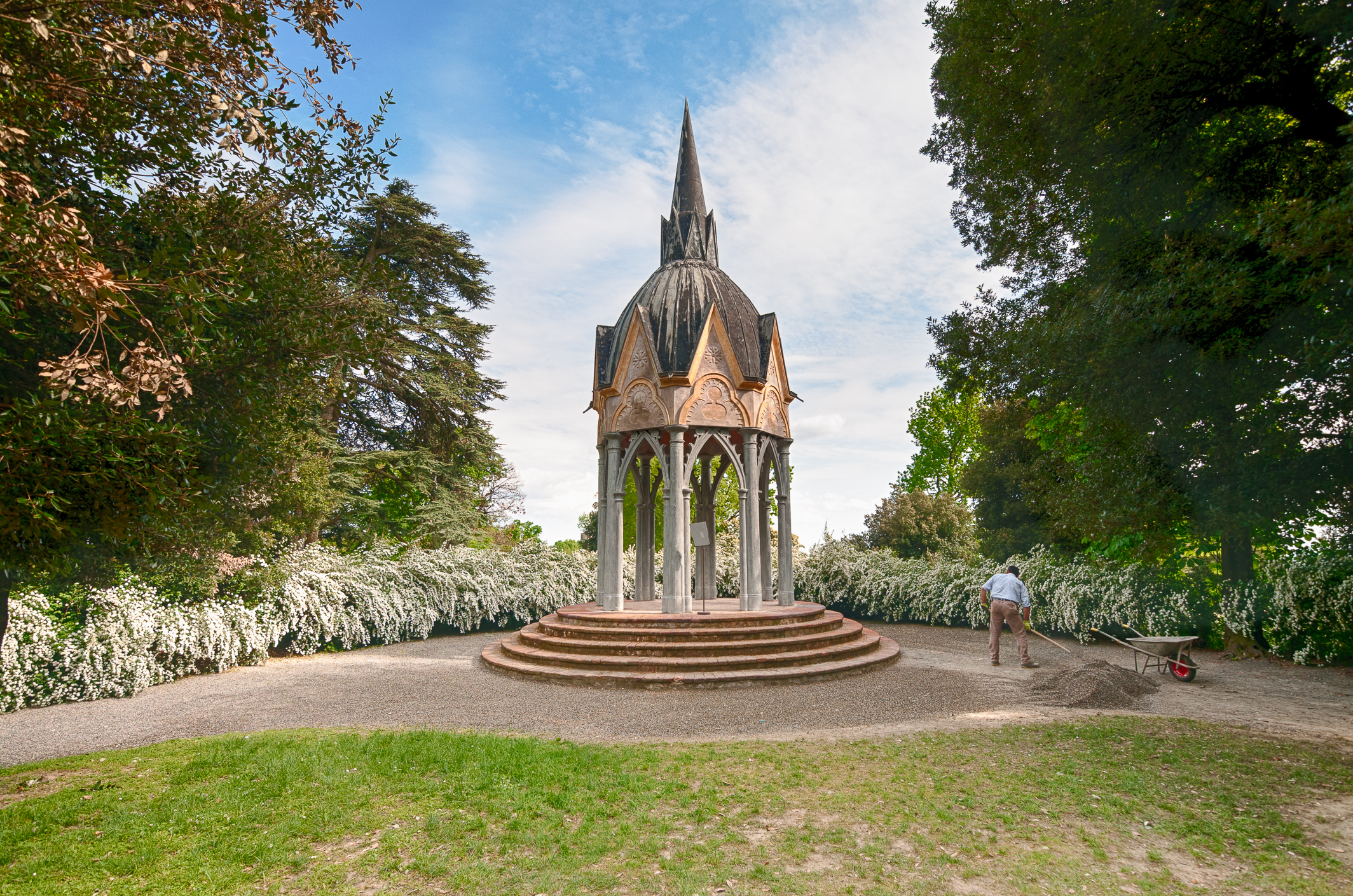
