= Santissimo Salvatore, Borgomasino =

Coordinates: 45°21′40″N 7°59′19″E

- Chiesa del Santissimo Salvatore (Italian)
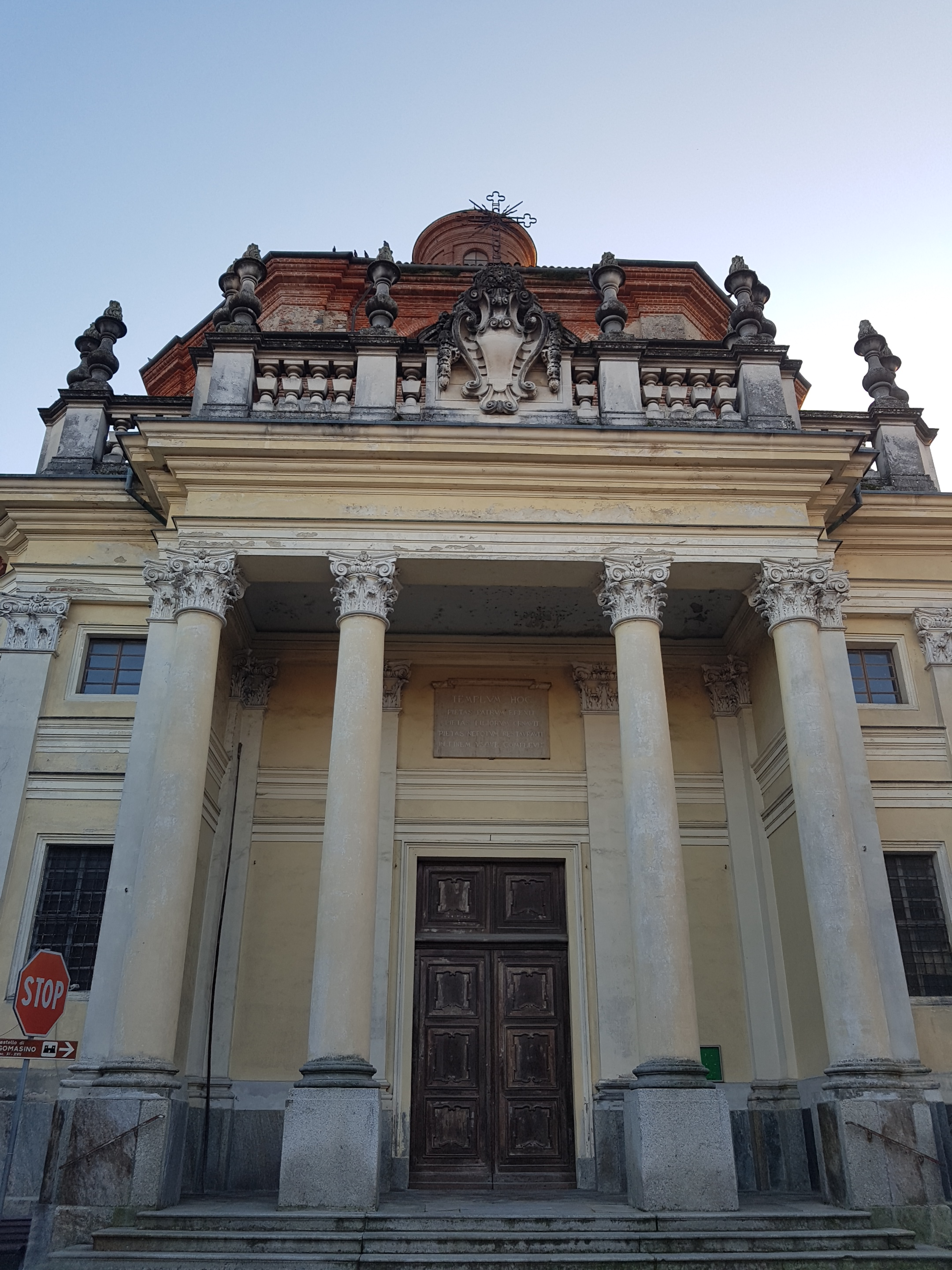
- Façade
- Click on the map for a fullscreen view
- Country: Italy
- Denomination: Roman Catholic

Architecture
- Functional status: Active

Administration
- Archdiocese: Diocese of Ivrea

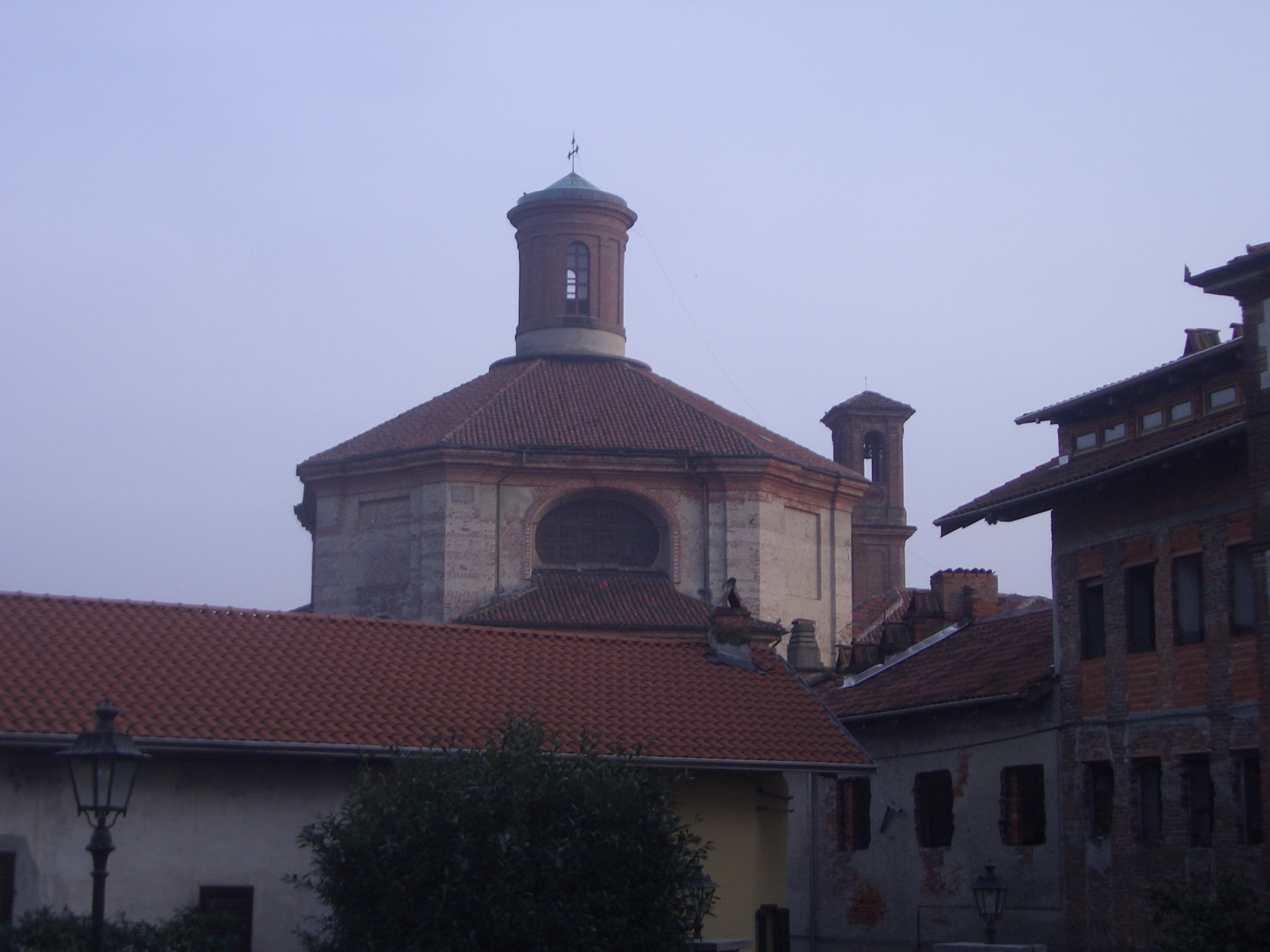
Dome of church from distance

Santissimo Salvatore (Italian: Chiesa parrocchiale del Santissimo Salvatore) is a late-Baroque style, Roman Catholic parish church located at the juncture of Via Torino and Piazza Regina Margherita in the town of Borgomasino in the Metropolitan City of Turin in the Italian region of Piedmont. An early design for the present church was by Bernardo Vittone.

== History and description ==
The church was meant to physically replace the smaller church of Santissimo Salvatore, which was a chapel annexed to the castle in the city center. However, because the Count of the town denied them the use of the former site, a new lot was acquired. The original design was by Michela di Agliè, and construction began in 1749. Originally conceived as a church with a central area with an imposing cupola, staircase entry, and triangular bell-tower, the design had to be modified to accommodate a limited budget, since some of the funds were transferred to the refurbishment of San Martino, and building was delayed by legal difficulties.

In 1760, the obstacles to construction were overcome, when the older parish church was threatened with material collapse. A new design was elicited from the architect Bernardo Vittone, but construction was started posthumously in 1773, since Vittone had died in 1770. Funds remained tight, and Vittone's design was never quite completed, trimming the prominent dome. The church was finally inaugurated in December 1793, although revolutionary events delayed consecration until 1825.

In 1935, the church was in need of restoration due to water infiltration from the roof, leading to an attempt to construct a dome, as originally planned. The facade and interiors were also restored, with work completed in 1937. Work on the facade continued until 1940.
