= Caravino =

- Comune
- Comune di Caravino
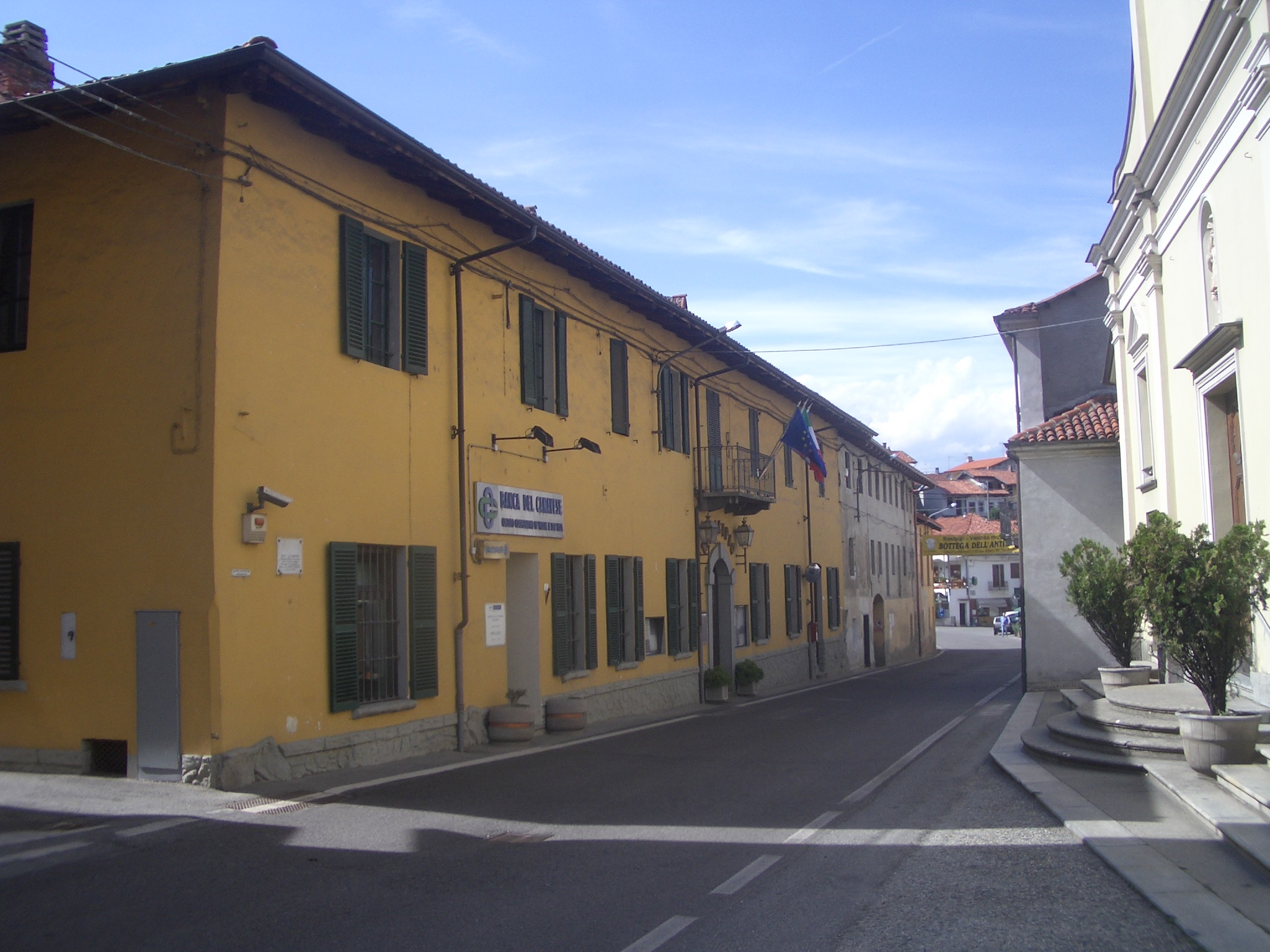

- Coat of arms

- Location within Italy Location within Piedmont
- Coordinates: 45°24′N 7°58′E
- Country: Italy
- Region: Piedmont
- Metropolitan city: Turin (TO)

Government
  - Mayor: Clara Angela Pasquale

Area
  - Total: 11.5 km^{2} (4.4 sq mi)
- Elevation: 257 m (843 ft)

Population (1-1-2017)
  - Total: 929
  - Density: 80.8/km^{2} (209/sq mi)
- Demonym: Caravinese(i)
- Time zone: UTC+1 (CET)
  - Summer (DST): UTC+2 (CEST)
- Postal code: 10010
- Dialing code: 0125
- Website: Official website

Caravino is a comune (municipality) in the Metropolitan City of Turin in the Italian region Piedmont, located about 45 kilometres (28 mi) northeast of Turin.

Caravino borders the following municipalities: Albiano d'Ivrea, Azeglio, Strambino, Settimo Rottaro, Vestignè, Cossano Canavese, and Borgomasino.
