= Strambino Castle =

Building in Strambino, Italy

- Castello di Strambino
- Strambino, Piedmont, Italy
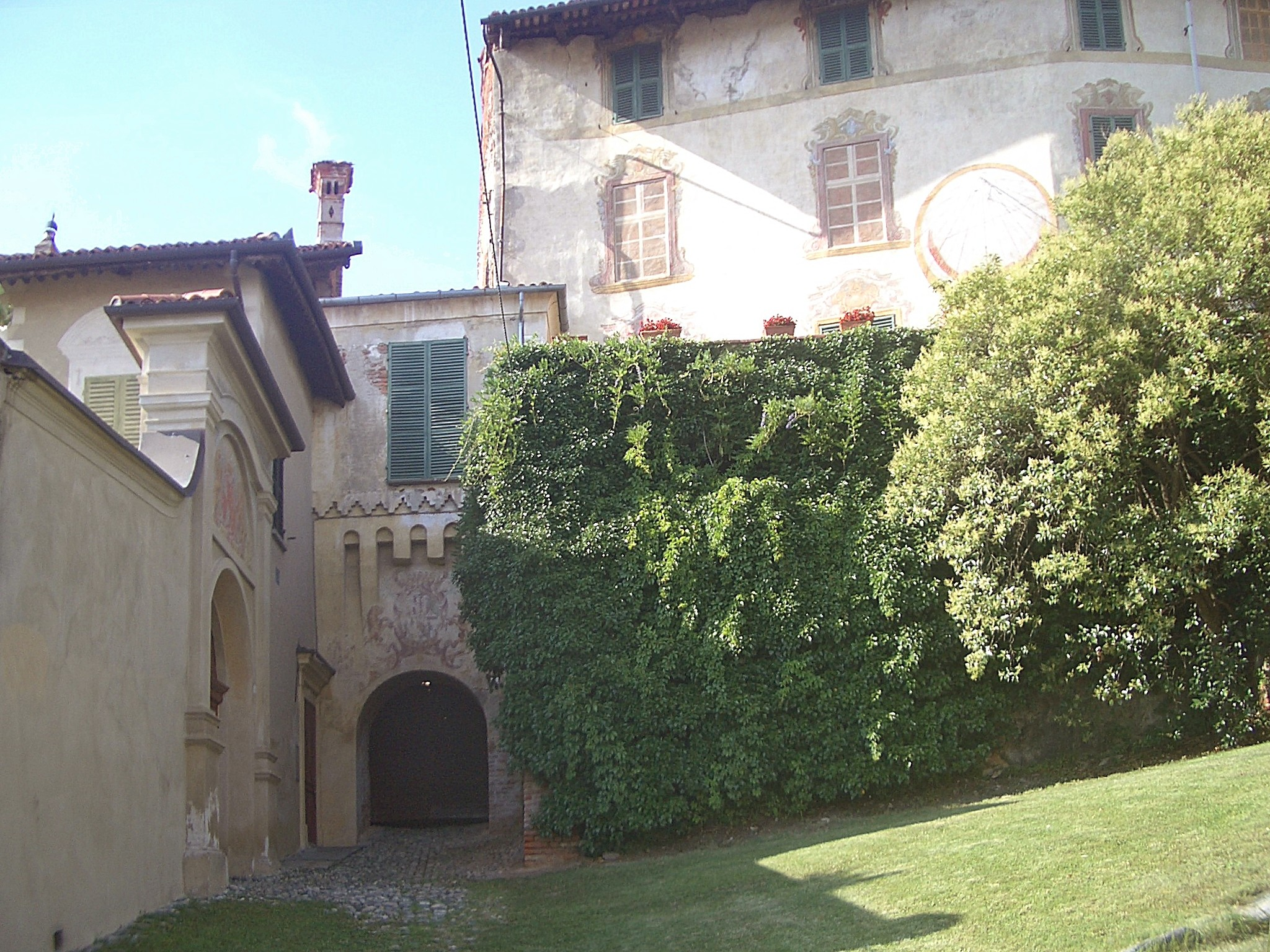
- Strambino Castle

Site information
- Type: Castle

Location
- Location in Italy
- Coordinates: 45°23′08.39″N 7°52′47.98″E

Strambino Castle (Italian: Castello di Strambino) is a castle located in Strambino, Piedmont, Italy.

== History ==
The castle was first mentioned under the name Castrum Strambini in a document from the 12th century, when it was likely under the authority of the Bishop of Ivrea. The structure underwent numerous modifications and various renovations over the centuries. The castle became the allodial property of the Counts of San Martino in 1797. In 1870, it was then bought by Marquis Scarampi of Villanova.

== Description ==
The complex consists of various buildings dating back to different periods. The oldest core is represented by the so-called Arduin castle (11th century), the southern expansion corresponds to the Gothic castle (15th century), while the palace built further south of the Gothic castle on the ramparts of the ancient fortress constitutes the Manor castle (17th century).

== Gallery ==
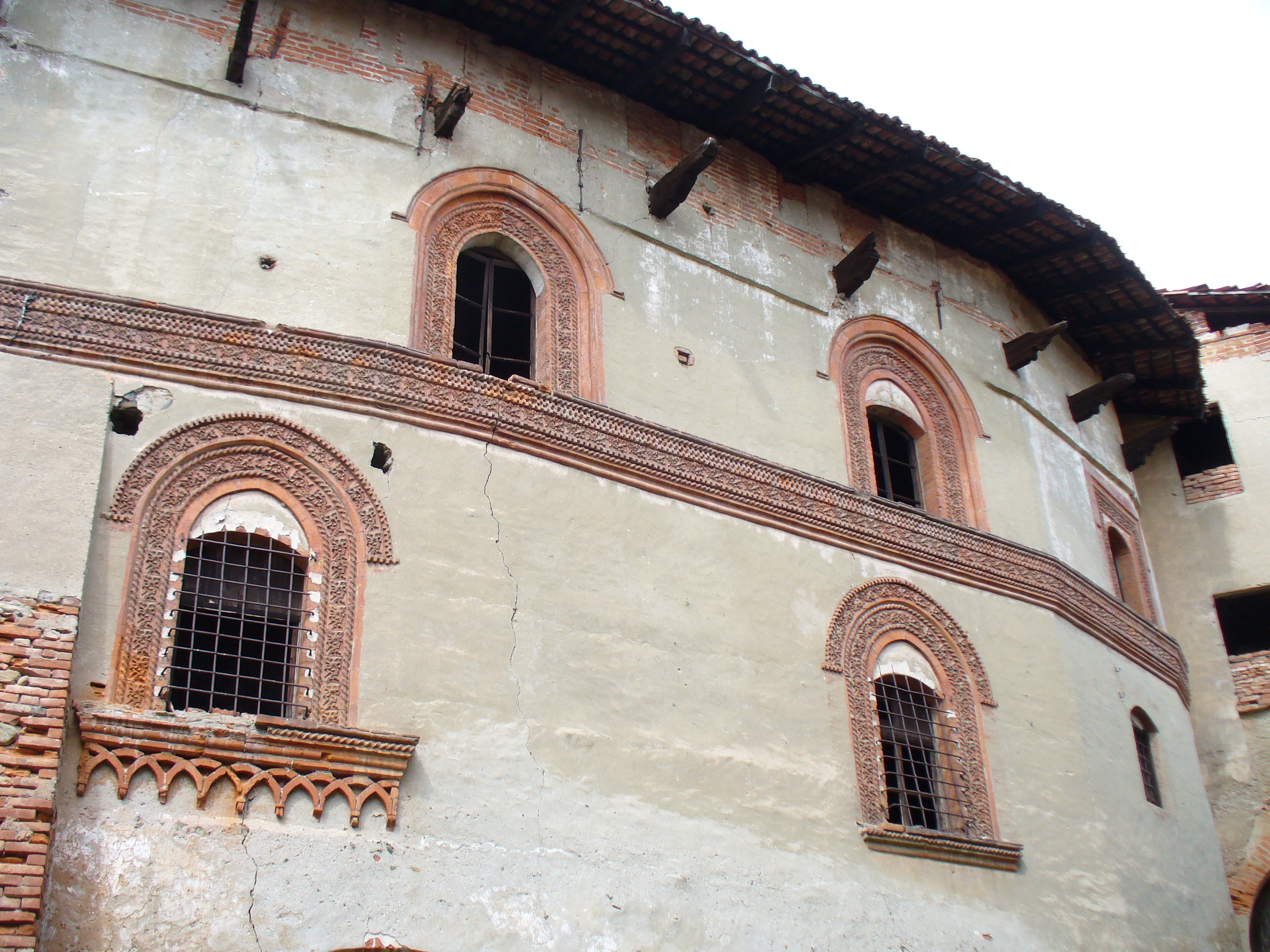

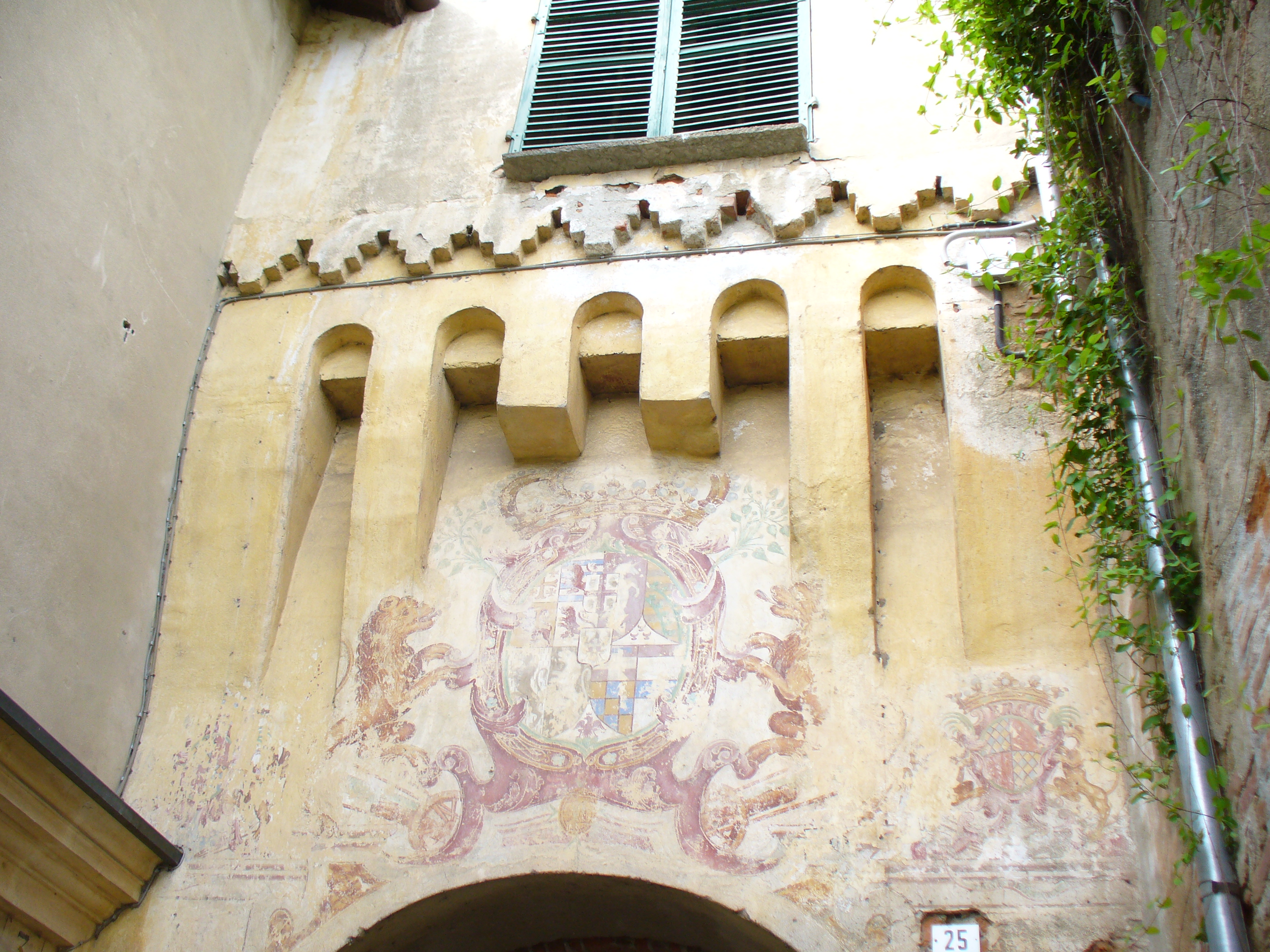

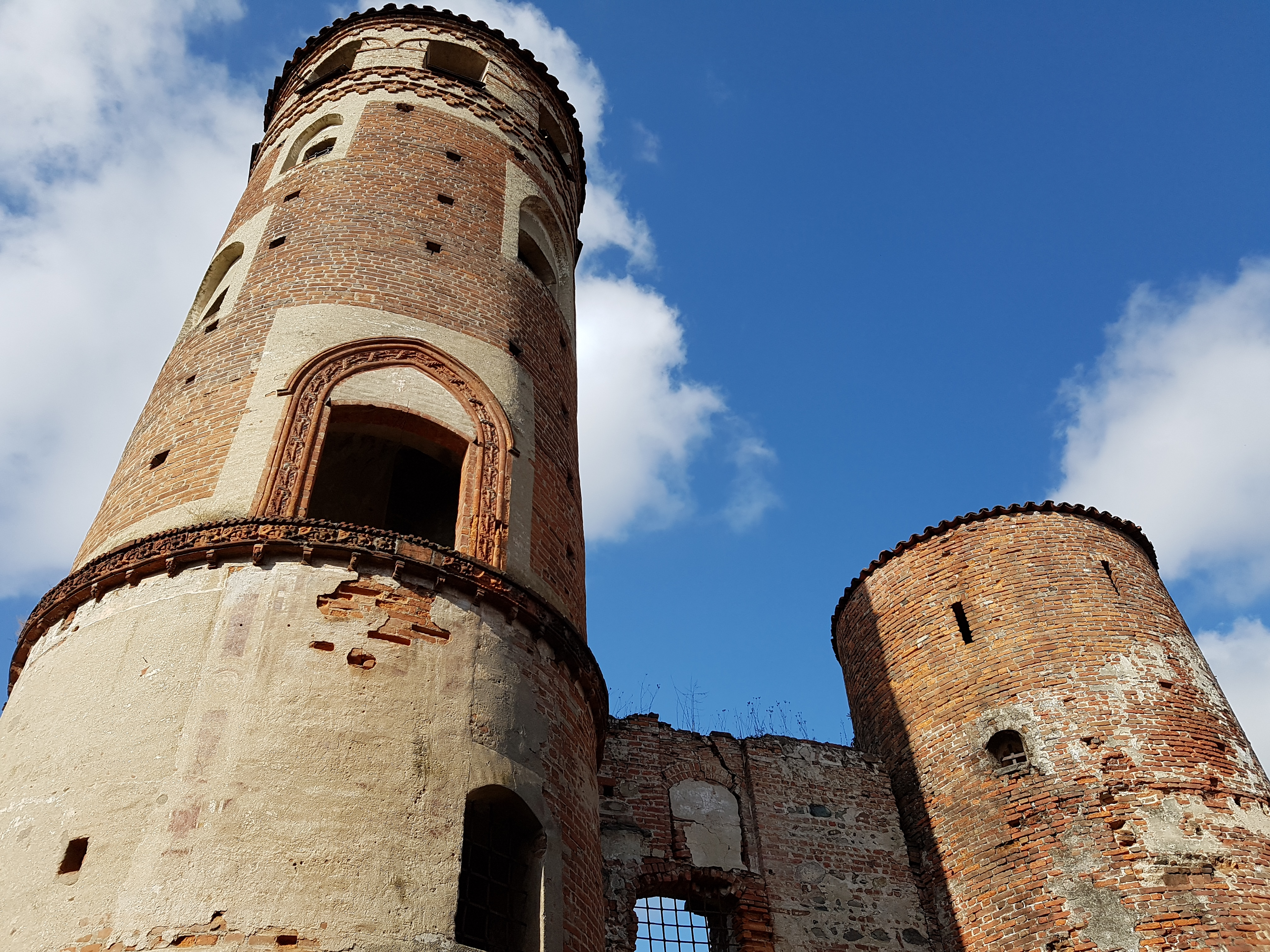
