= Albiano d'Ivrea Castle =

- Castello di Albiano d'Ivrea
- Albiano d'Ivrea, Piedmont, Italy
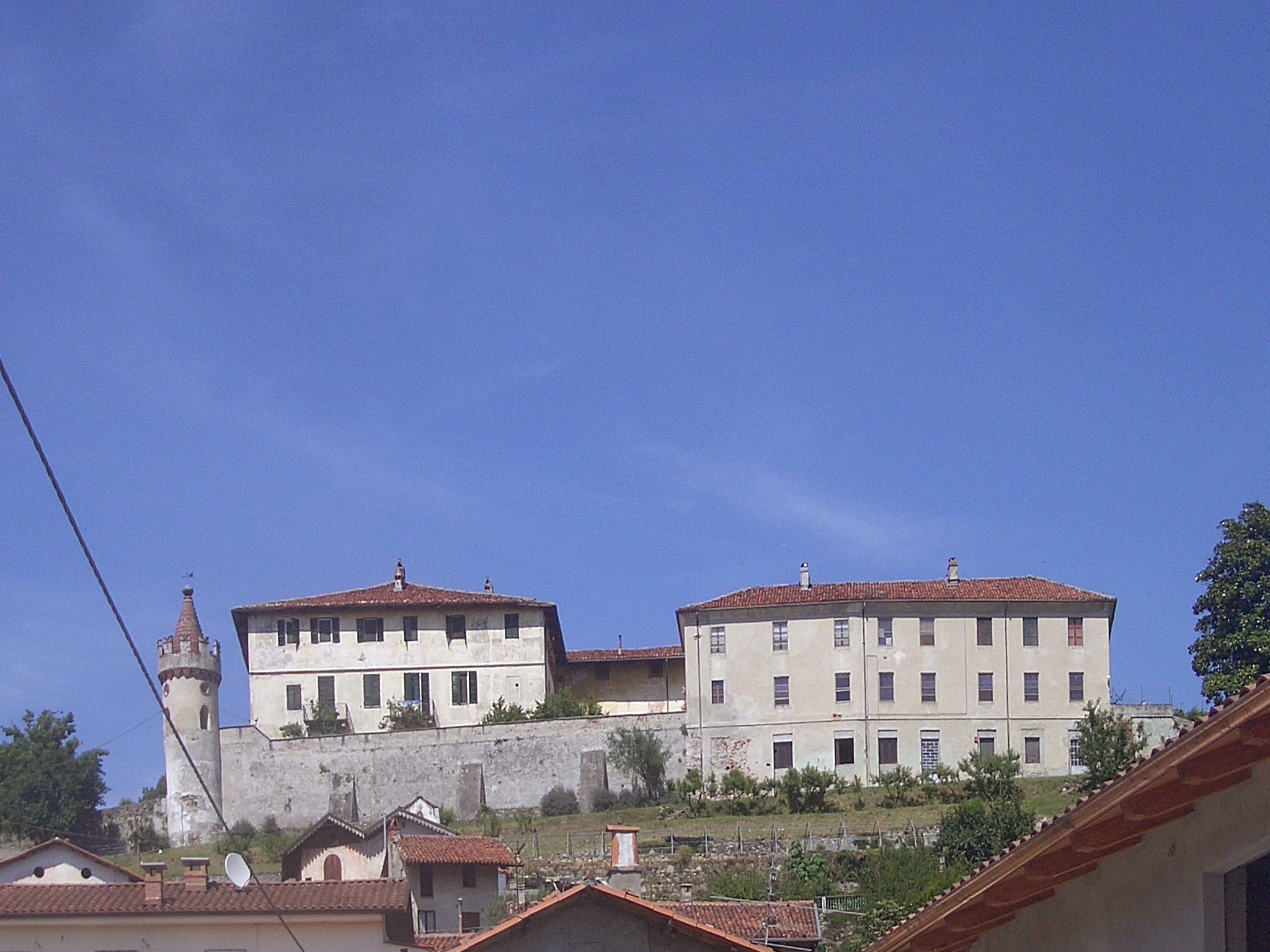
- Albiano d'Ivrea Castle

Site information
- Type: Castle

Location
- Location in Italy
- Coordinates: 45°26′07.08″N 7°57′02.67″E

Albiano d'Ivrea Castle (Italian: Castello di Albiano d'Ivrea) is a castle located in Albiano d'Ivrea, Piedmont, Italy.

== History ==
The history of the castle is closely tied to the temporal authority of the Bishops of Ivrea, under whose control it remained since ancient times. In the year 1000, it was granted as a fief by emperor Otto I to the Bishop of Ivrea, likely formalising an arrangement that had already in place for centuries.

In 1326, the castle was granted to Philip I of Piedmont, progenitor of the House of Savoy-Achaea, but was returned to the Bishop of Ivrea in 1361 following the wars in the Canavese region. Rebuilt by bishop Bonifacio Ferrero after suffering from pillaging and decay, it was destroyed again during the Piedmontese Civil War in 1641, being reconstructed in its present form at the beginning of the 19th century. The castle has served for centuries served as the summer residence of the Bishop of Ivrea, who to this day retains the title of Count of Albiano, though no longer in use.

In 1841, it hosted Ferdinando of Savoy, 1st Duke of Genoa.
