= Bononio =

Italian Roman Catholic saint

Saint Bononius

Abbot of Lucedio
- Born: late 10th century
- Died: 30 August 1026
- Venerated in: Eastern Orthodox Church; Roman Catholic Church
- Canonized: 1026 by Pope John XIX
- Feast: 30 August
- Attributes: Monastic habit, insignia of an abbot

Saint Bononio or Bononius (died 30 August 1026) was a Benedictine abbot, who is venerated as a saint in the Eastern Orthodox Church and Roman Catholic Church, being commemorated with a feast day on 30 August.

== Biography ==
Bononio was born in Bologna sometime in the latter part of the tenth century. He became a monk at an early age, and while on a pilgrimage to the East, settled in Egypt to live as a hermit during the reign of Fatamid Caliph Al-Aziz Billah. Noted for both his asceticism and charitable works, Bononio acquired some influence at court, and was permitted to build a few churches. When Peter, bishop of Vercelli, was captured by Arab forces after the Battle of Stilo, Bononio assisted in the bishop's release, and then retired to live as a hermit in the Sinai Peninsula.

In gratitude for Bononio's assistance, when Peter returned to Italy, he named him abbot of the monastery of Lucedio. At Lucedio, Bononio restored discipline amongst the monks and provided for the surrounding population. He died in Lucedio on 30 August 1026.

Bononio was canonised by Pope John XIX. The saint's feast is celebrated on that day in the Piedmont liturgical calendar. The village of San Bononio is part of the municipality of Curino. It celebrates its patron's feast with a three-day festival of concerts, art exhibitions, and lanterns on the canal.

The story that Bononio was a disciple of Saint Romuald is based on a much later spurious vita fabricated by a Camaldolese abbot.
