= Borgomasino =

- Comune
- Comune di Borgomasino
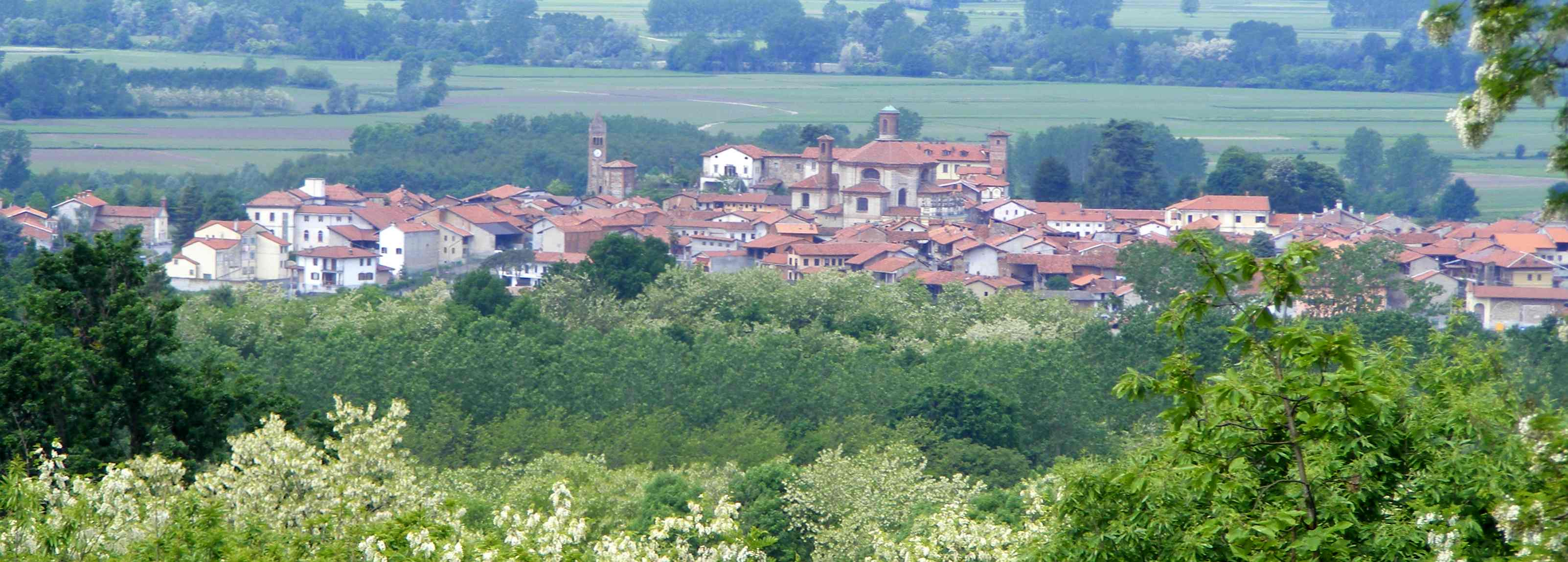

- Coat of arms

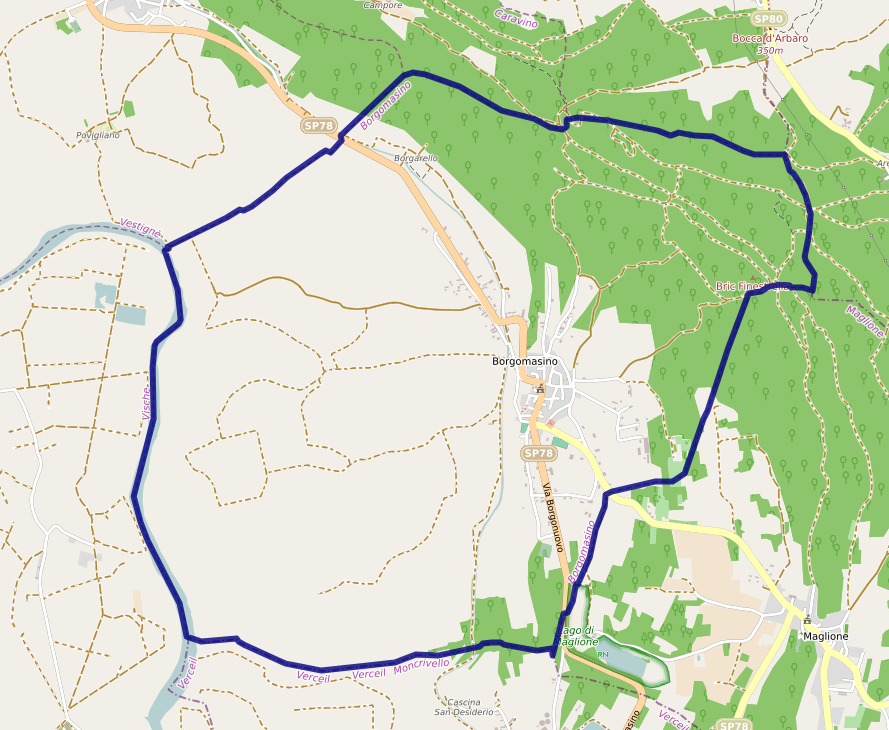

- Location within Italy Location within Piedmont
- Coordinates: 45°22′N 7°59′E
- Country: Italy
- Region: Piedmont
- Metropolitan city: Turin (TO)

Government
  - Mayor: Gianfranco Bellardi

Area
  - Total: 12.37 km^{2} (4.78 sq mi)
- Elevation: 260 m (850 ft)

Population (30 November 2017)
  - Total: 811
  - Density: 65.6/km^{2} (170/sq mi)
- Demonym: Borgomasinesi
- Time zone: UTC+1 (CET)
  - Summer (DST): UTC+2 (CEST)
- Postal code: 10031
- Dialing code: 0125
- Website: Official website

Borgomasino is a comune (municipality) in the Metropolitan City of Turin in the Italian region Piedmont, located about 40 kilometres (25 mi) northeast of Turin.

Among the sites are the Parish Church of Santissimo Salvatore designed by Bernardo Vittone and Borgomasino Castle.

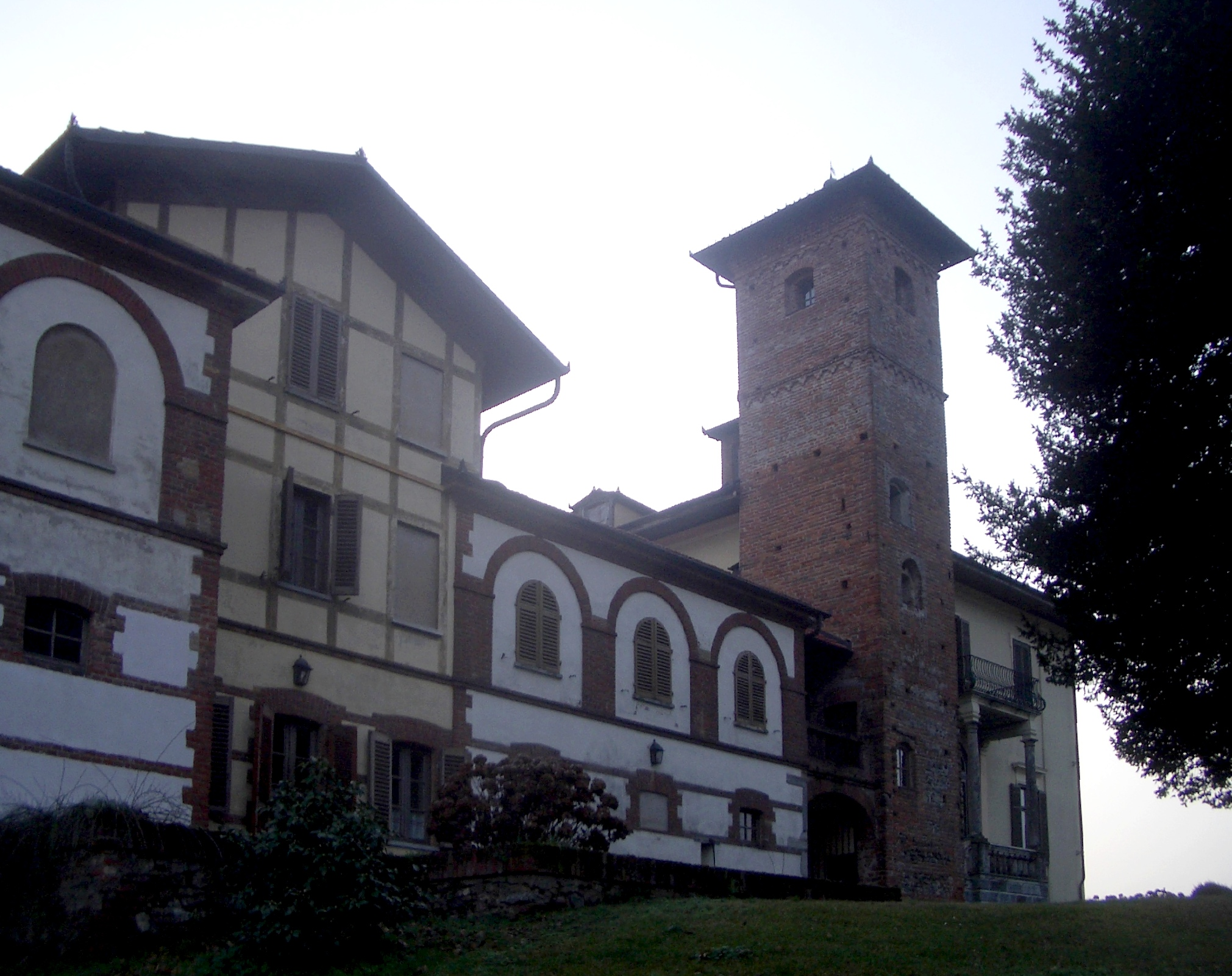
