= Viverone Hydroelectric Power Station =

Power station in Viverone, Italy

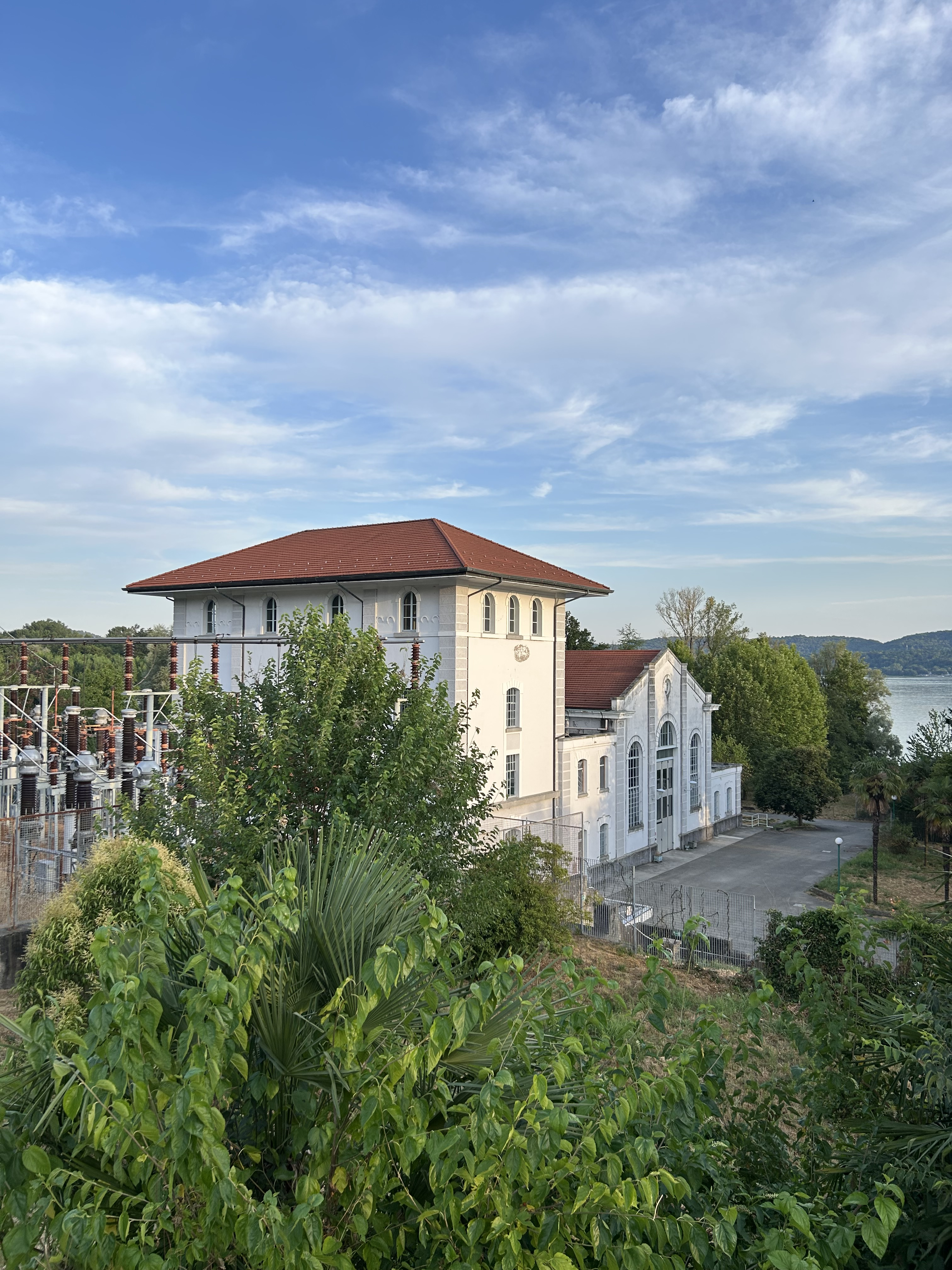
- Viverone Hydroelectric Power Station in 2026

- Location within Italy
- Country: Italy
- Location: Viverone, Aosta Valley
- Coordinates: 45.430159°N 8.040096°E
- Purpose: Power
- Opening date: 1913

Viverone Hydroelectric Power Station (Italian: Centrale idroelettrica di Viverone) is a hydroelectric power plant located in Viverone, in the Piedmont region of northern Italy.

== History ==
The power station was built in 1912 by Società Anonima Elettricità Alta Italia and entered service in 1913.

The plant remained in operation until the 1950s. After its decommissioning, the facility was repurposed as a training center for the electricity company Terna.

== Description ==
The plant exploited the approximately 150-meter elevation difference between two natural glacial lakes: the larger Lake Viverone, at a lower elevation, and the smaller Lake Bertignano, located about one kilometer away at a higher elevation. Lake Bertignano served as the upper reservoir of the pumped-storage system.

At night, water was pumped from Lake Viverone up to Lake Bertignano. During the day, it was released back downhill through a penstock to the power station on the shore of Lake Viverone, where turbines with an installed capacity of approximately 7 MW converted the hydraulic head into electricity for transmission to the power grid.

The power station building features an eclectic architecture.
