= Villa Saporiti (Piverone) =

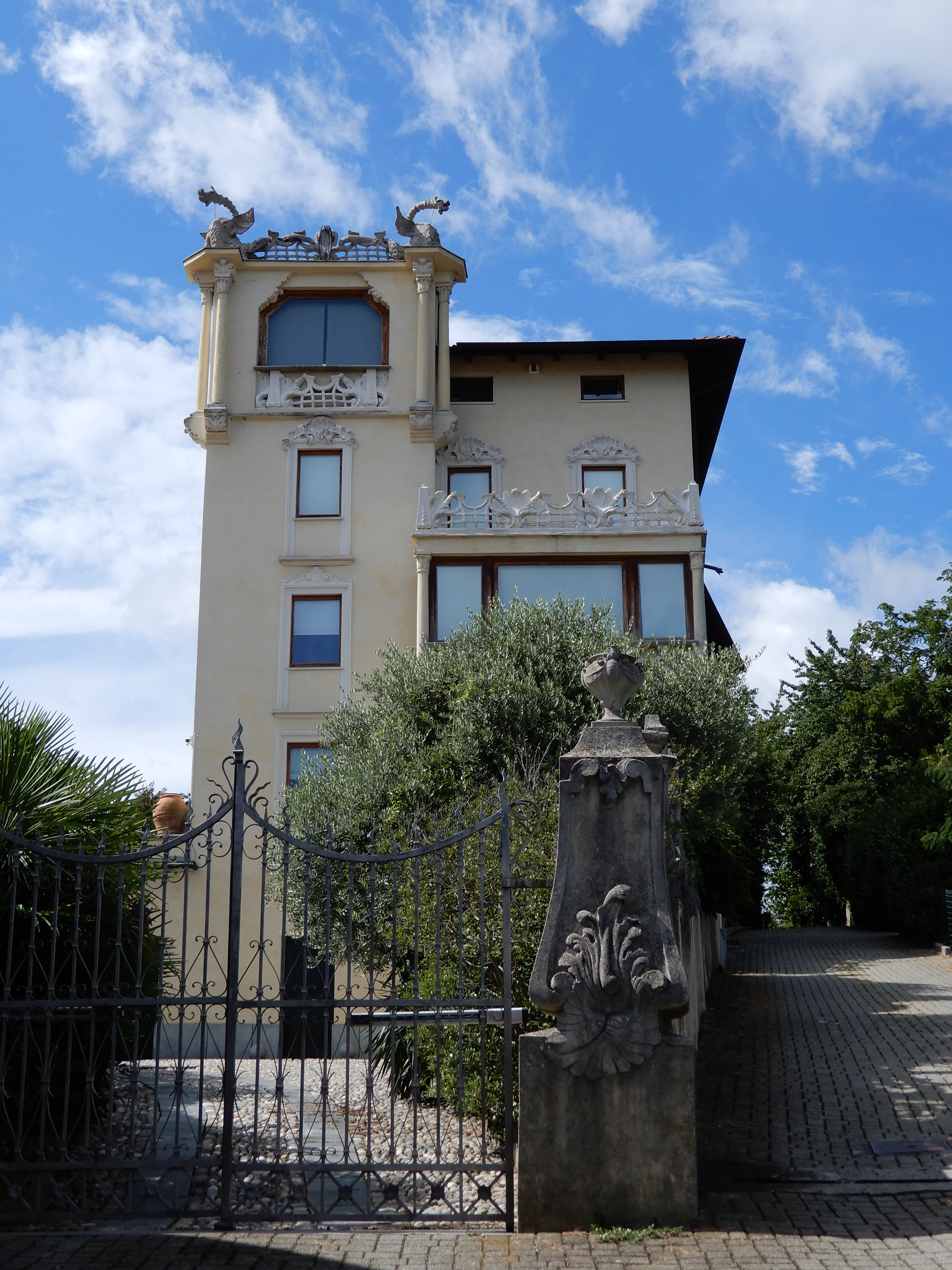
- Villa Saporiti in 2020
- Click on the map for a fullscreen view

General information
- Location: Piverone, Italy
- Coordinates: 45°25′53.2″N 8°01′40.8″E

Villa Saporiti is a historic eclectic villa overlooking Lake Viverone in Piverone, Piedmont, Italy.

== History ==
The villa was built in 1920 at the behest of Giuseppe Saporiti, a wealthy Varese-based construction entrepreneur active between Italy and France in the first half of the 20th century.

== Description ==
Set in a panoramic position overlooking Lake Viverone, the villa blends Medieval Revival influences with Mannerist and Baroque elements, such as the relief decorations on its corner tower, which serves as the building's visual focal point. The tower is crowned by a loggia supported by pairs of columns, which in turn hold a roof adorned with statues of roaring winged dragons.
