= Victimulae =

Roman gold mining settlement

- Victumulae, Victimula, Victimuli or Ictimuli
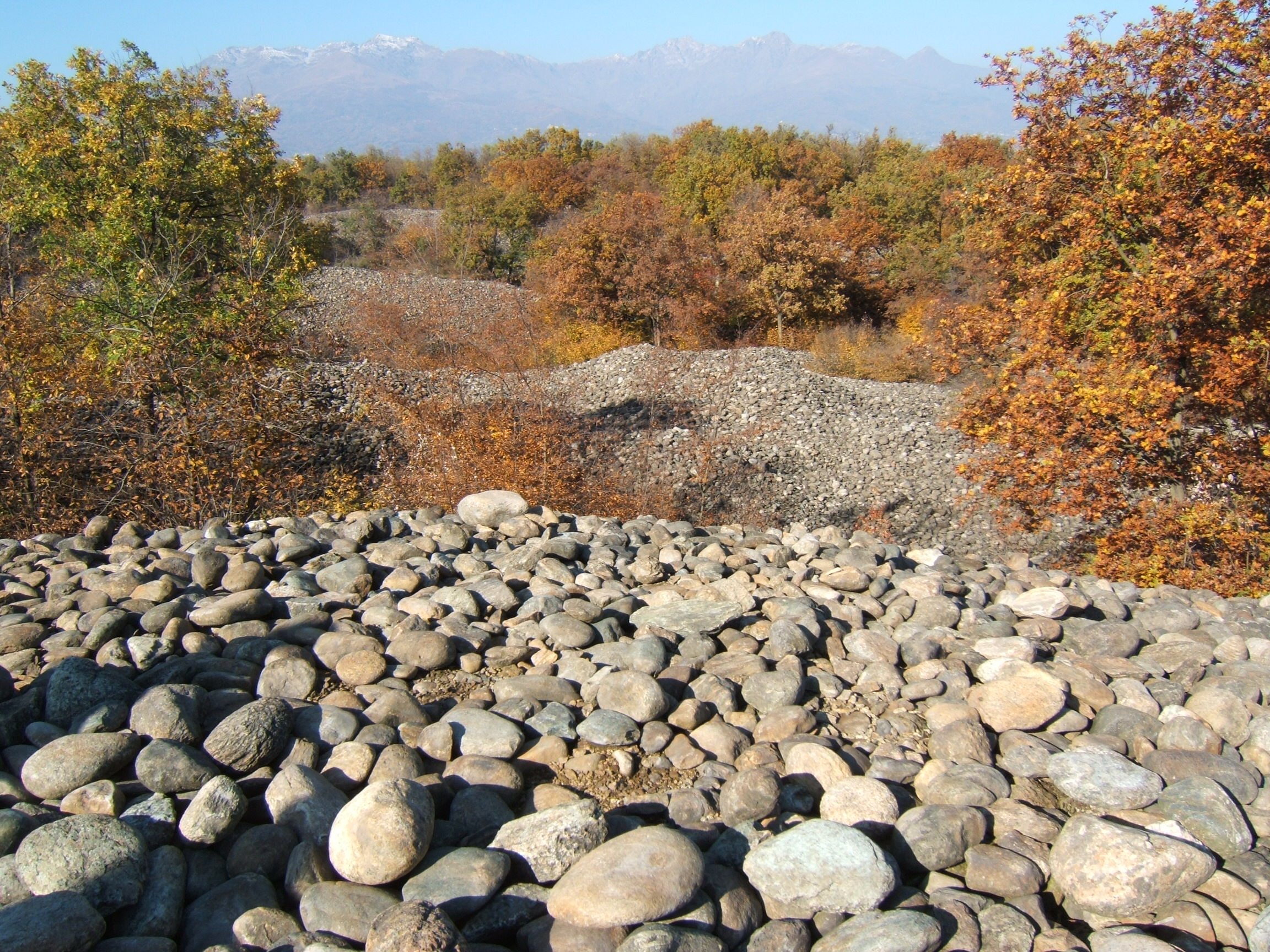
- Remains of Roman alluvial gold extraction in the Bessa Natural Reserve.
- Interactive map of Victimulae
- 45.496°N 08.025°E
- Periods: Classical Antiquity
- Cultures: Ancient Rome
- Location: Bessa Goldfield
- Region: Piedmont

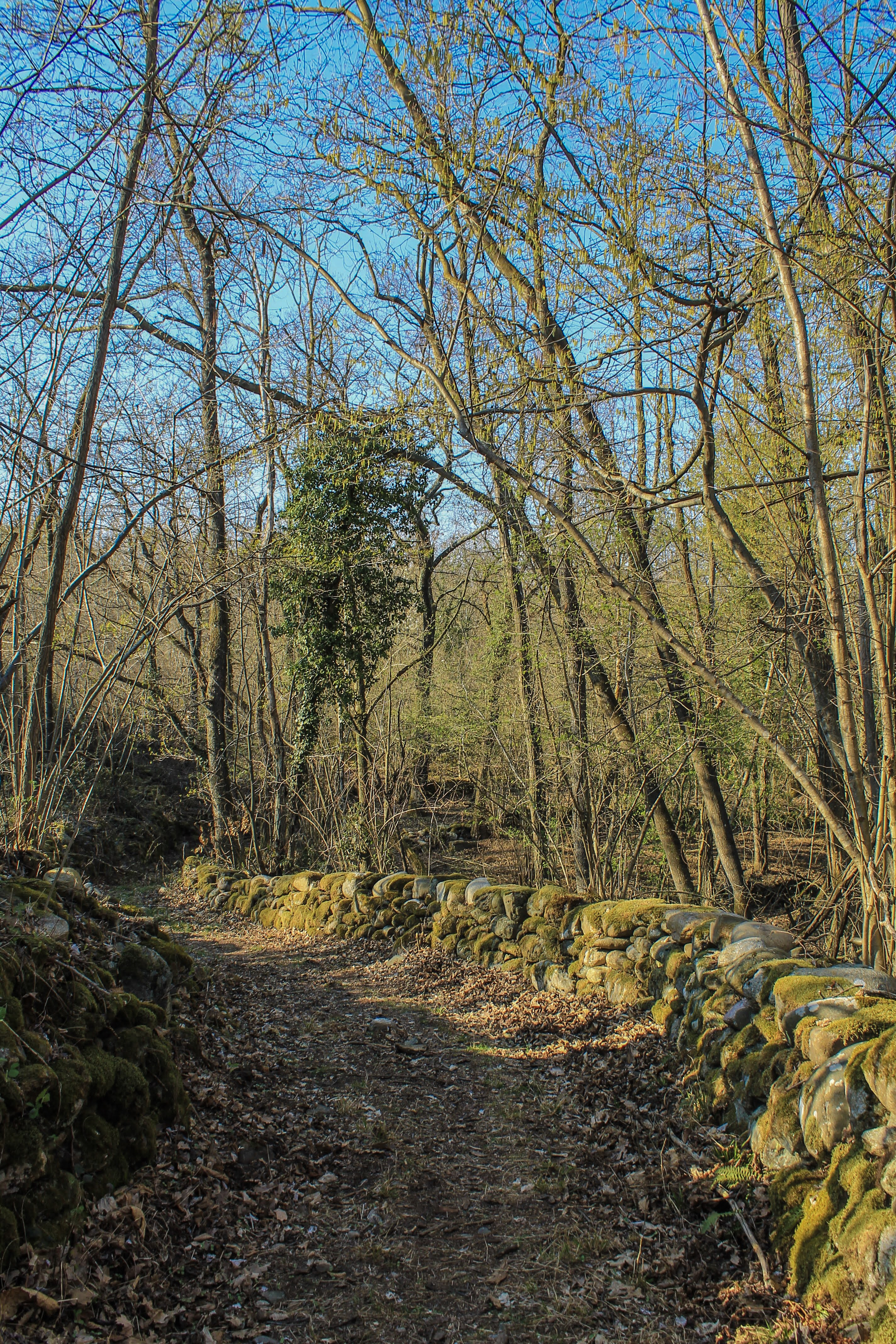

Victimulae (Ancient Greek: Ἰκτουμούλων, romanized: Iktoumoúlōn) also spelt Victumulae, Victimula, Victimuli or Ictimuli was a Roman settlement (probably pre-Roman in origin) located in Piedmont, in the south-west area of Biella, not far from Lake Viverone. It is believed to have been located on the slopes of the Serra Morenica d'Ivrea near the Bessa plateau. The closest contemporary settlement was San Secondo in Salussola.

It is believed that the village had already developed in pre-Roman times to house the metallurgical workforce exploiting the Bessa goldfield.

Gold objects found near Lake Viverone in a middle bronze age context suggest that extractive activity was already underway by this time. Numerous cup marked stones demonstrate middle iron age occupation by the Salassi who also controlled the territory of Biella with a part of the current province of Turin and the Aosta Valley.

== Historic sources ==
Strabo mentions in the Geographica (5.1.12) that in 143-140 BC the Roman consul Appius Claudius Pulcher annexed Victimulae from the Salassi, citing interruption of water from "Dora" river, previously used for crop irrigation, for alluvial gold mining, as the causus belli. After returning to Rome, he asked the Senate for a triumph but was denied due to the high number of losses.

The identification of the gold deposit with the Bessa is likely but not certain, given that it must have been a large deposit and that the quantity of water used seemed to create supply problems. Probably the historian citing the Dora (Duria) was not referring to the current river that descends from the Aosta Valley and is separated from the Bessa by the large moraine hill of the Serra, but used it as a hydronym, given that there were no other deposits in the region of such consistency as to justify a, however specious, dispute over the water. Not too far from the area there are still numerous "Dore": in Piedmont there is the Dora Riparia, in Savoy and in the Canton of Valais the Doire, Doron, Drance are common and finally Durius was the ancient name of the Duero river. The exact duration of the period of exploitation is not known, but it is known that at the time Strabo wrote, the mines had already been abandoned (probably because they were now exhausted) and Rome's gold now came mostly from Iberia.

It has also been hypothesized that the Battle of Ticino took place in the vicinity of the village called Victimulae in late autumn (mid-November) of 218 BC. It was a brief clash between the vanguards of the Punic army and the Roman army. In reality, the precise location of the clash is not certain. To confirm this, it must be said that the presumed location of the aforementioned village is tens of kilometers from the Ticino river (being located near the Elvo torrent, a tributary of the Cervo which in turn is a tributary of the Sesia river, not of the Ticino).

Pliny mentions "Victumula" in the territory of the Vercellae in book 33 of the Naturalis Historia.

== Archaeology ==
Among the many suppositions regarding the city and the metal mining activities, one thing is certain: over the centuries, the valley of San Secondo di Salussola has yielded many archaeological materials from the Roman and medieval ages, some of which have become part of the collections of the museums of Vercelli, Biella, and Turin, but a good part has been lost. The random finds by local farmers while working in the fields, and the lack of attention paid to the conservation of the finds have meant that many of the materials that sources attest to having been discovered in San Secondo are no longer available today. Despite the lack of documentation, it can be said that this is a singular area from an archaeological point of view, not only for the quantity of the findings, but also for the fact that some architectural structures, presumably dating back to the Roman period, were still perfectly visible until the nineteenth century.

Settlements at the site of "Ciapei përfonda" in the area of Bessa di Vermogno (municipality of Zubiena) have been subject to recent archaeological investigations. Ceramic materials (amphorae and pottery) have come to light that can be dated chronologically between the end of the 2nd century BC and the middle of the 1st century BC: the findings, which can be included in the series of ceramic finds found in other sites of Bessa, therefore confirm the news of ancient sources that attested to the maximum exploitation of the mines in this period.

The link between Victimula and the Aurifodinae (less than 6 km apart as the crow flies) is attested in the Geographica (5.1.12), which after referring to a gold mine located in the Vercelli, mentions "a village near the Victimulae".

== Modern times ==
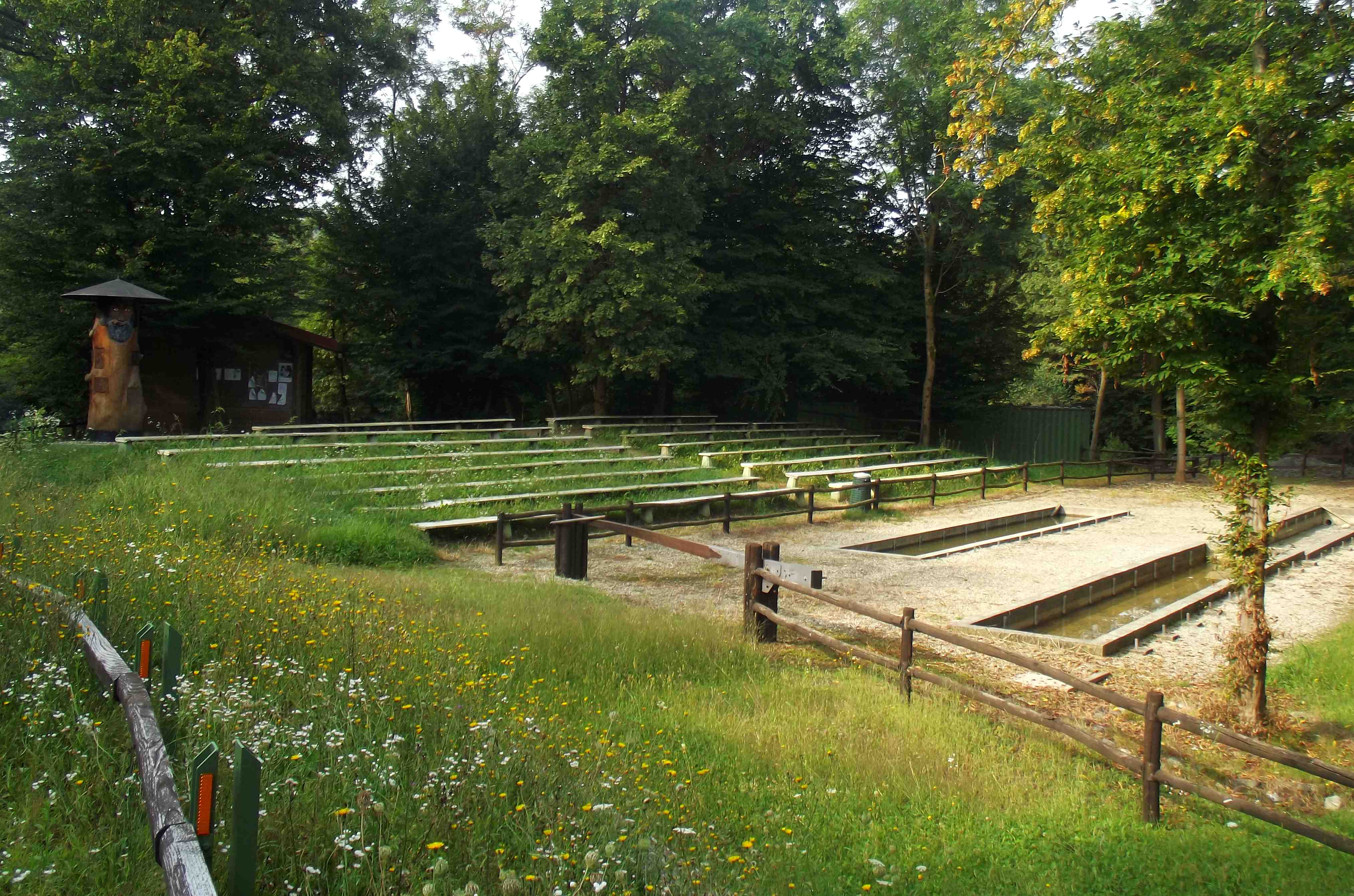
The area in Vermogno for gold panning competitions

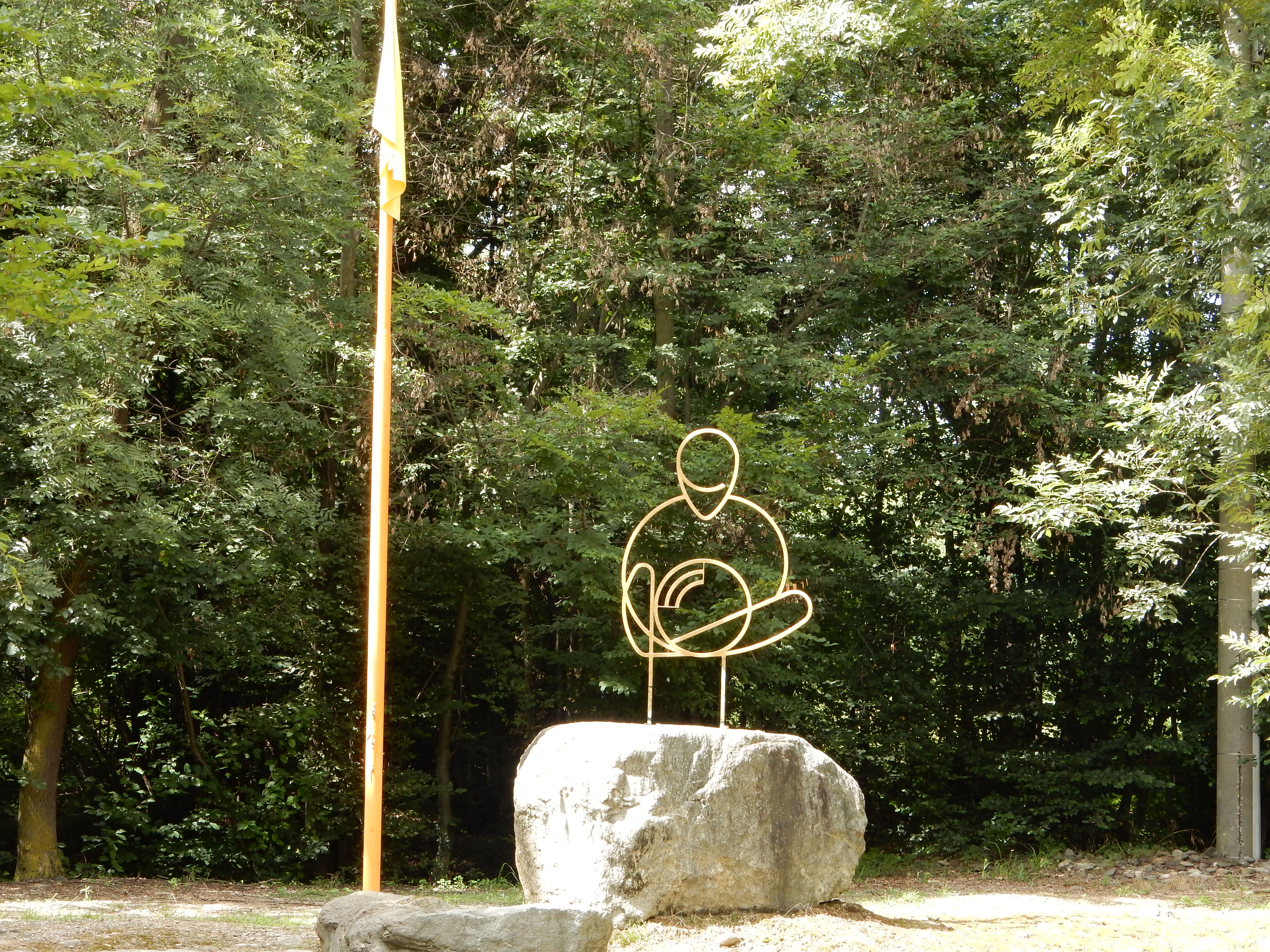
Monument to gold miners in Vermogno

The area that is "touristically" indicated as the site of the city of Victimula has been used since the second half of the twentieth century as an equipped picnic area located in the Bessa di Vermogno area (municipality of Zubiena), near the site of "Ciapel përfondà".

From the area, several paths branch off and cross the Bessa nature reserve. These wind through the woods and large piles of debris due to the intense metal extraction activity, between erratic boulders and some ruins of sites of archaeological interest (there is also an ancient stone drain that appears very well preserved).

The area indicated as Victimula today, certainly closer to the deposits than to what could have been the actual village, is also occasionally used by gold panning enthusiasts for gatherings and events related to a hobby that finds an ideal place in this area, given the presence of alluvial gold in the waterways, especially in the nearby Elvo stream.

== See also ==
- Battle of Ticinus
- Hannibal Barca
- Monte Orsetto
- Museo dell'oro e della Bessa
- Serra Morenica di Ivrea
- Ecomuseo del Biellese
- Ictis

== Bibliography ==
- Luigi Bavagnoli, L'oro dei Vittimuli
- don Carlo Rolfo, Vittimula. Vicende storiche di un grande popolo estinto
- Roberto Gremmo, Il biellese magico e misterioso
- Mario Scarzella, Paolo Scarzella, L'oro della Bessa e i Vittimuli, Sandro Maria Rosso, 1973
- Giuseppe Quaglino, Bessa un giacimento polimetallico.
- Tassone Erica, Victimula, editore Atene del Canavese, 2022
