= Lake Bertignano =

Intermorainic lake in Piedmont, Italy

Lago di Bertignano
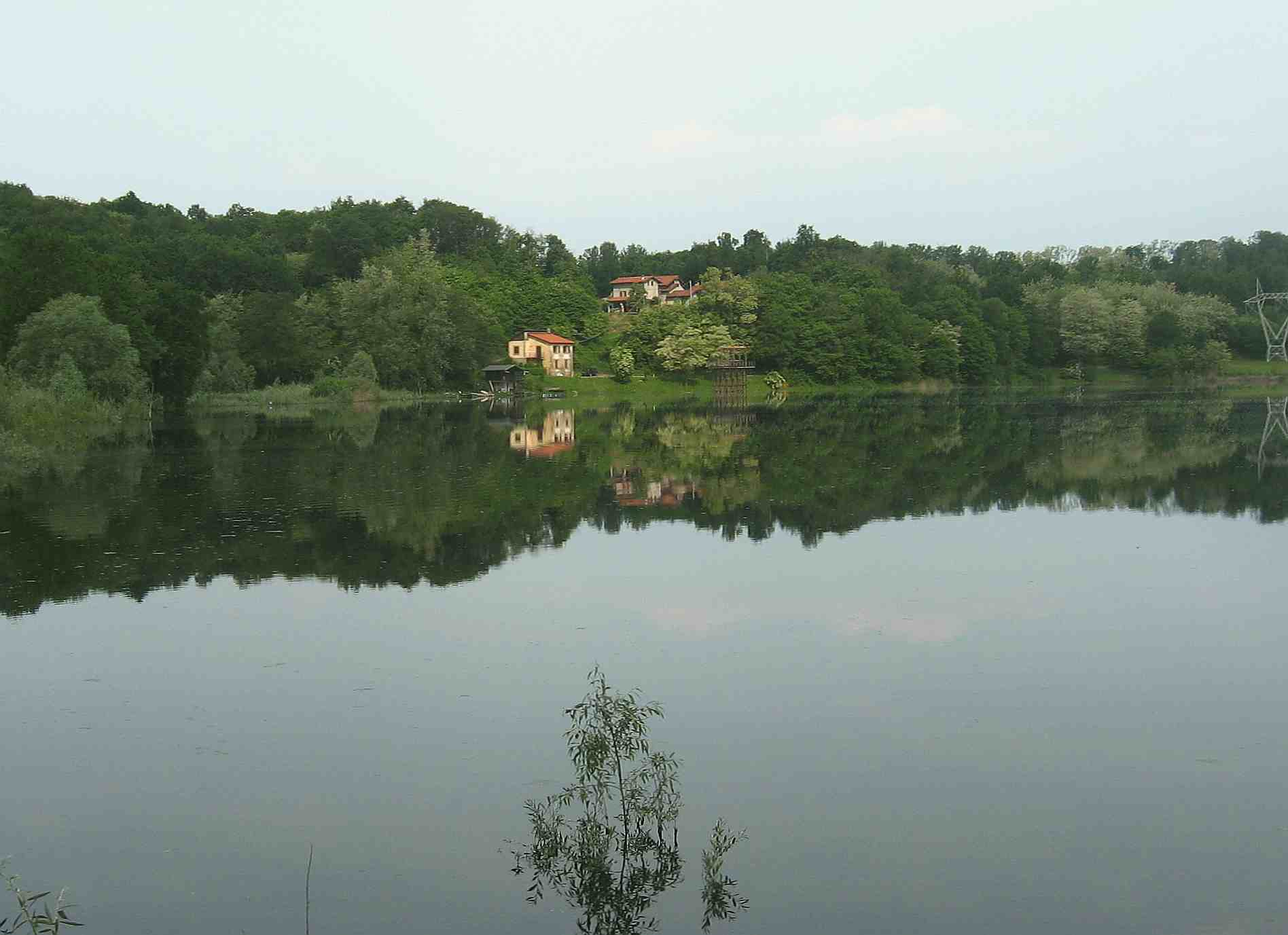
- Interactive map of Lago di Bertignano
- Location: Viverone, Province of Biella, Piedmont, Italy
- Coordinates: 45°25′54″N 8°04′36″E
- Type: Intermorainic lake
- Islands: None

Lago di Bertignano is a small lake basin located at 377 m (1,237 ft) elevation near the eponymous hamlet northeast of Viverone, in Piedmont.

== Morphology and geology ==
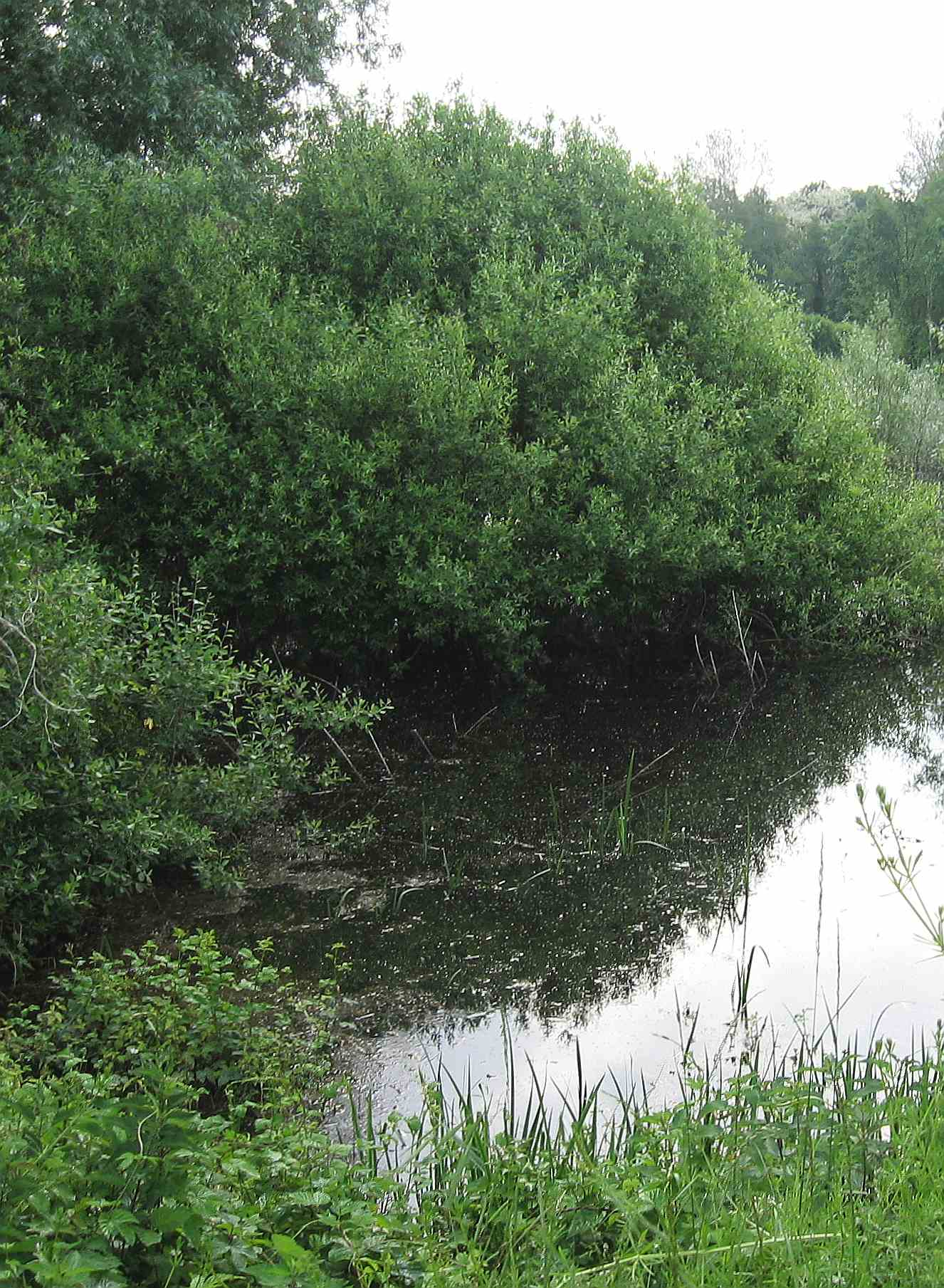
The marshy area east of the lake

Like the nearby (and much larger) Lago di Viverone, Bertignano is also an intermorainic lake, which originated in the context of successive expansions and retreats of the ancient Balteo glacier.

These phenomena created the Ivrea Morainic Amphitheatre and the Morainic mountains of Ivrea; within the ridges of sediments deposited by the glacier, some bodies of water remained trapped, including that of Bertignano.

The lake has a slightly elongated shape in a northwest/southeast direction; just east of the main body of water, there is another small basin in the process of silting up.

A modest outflow runs eastward but tends to disappear near the nearby Borgata Salomone, a hamlet of Roppolo.

The lake is surrounded by a small road and is crossed by a mock high-voltage line, disconnected from the grid and used only for training Terna (Enel) personnel; near its shores, there are some farmhouses, and the area has maintained a quiet rural atmosphere.

== History ==
At the bottom of the lake, two ancient monoxylon dugout canoes were found, that is, long canoes built from a single tree trunk. The first, in excellent condition, was easily discovered in 1912, and dated to 250 AD. For the other, found in the lakebed in 1978, it took 4 years (until 1982) of careful preparations by expert divers for the actual recovery operation. The artifact, once retrieved, was initially dated around 5,400 BC, but the carbon-14 method dated it to around 1,450 BC. The historical research in the 1980s was conducted by Luigi Fozzati of the Archaeological Superintendency of Piedmont. These archaeological remains are still preserved at the Museo di Antichità in Turin.

Near the lake, prehistoric ornaments and the remains of a pile-dwelling village from the late Bronze Age (850-900 BC), called Purcarel, were also found.

Towards the northern hills of Monte Orsetto, further artifacts were found, mainly from Celtic settlements.

The body of water and various surrounding lands are rich in pylons and power lines owned by Terna (Enel Group), for training purposes.

From the 1950s to the 1970s, the lake was used as a water storage reservoir, also pumped from the underlying Lago di Viverone, which then, by gravity, powered a hydroelectric plant located on the shore of Lago di Viverone. The two lakes are still connected by a buried, unused pressure pipeline. Some components of the plant are still present: gate lifting mechanisms in the lake itself, a control cabin on the shore, a cylindrical metal storage tank on the hill about 1 km west of the lake, and sections of pipeline in the land between the lake and the tank and immediately upstream of the plant in Viverone.

== Hiking ==
On the eastern shore of the lake runs the GtB (Grande Traversata del Biellese), a long hiking itinerary that traverses the entire Province of Biella at mid-low altitude.

The Piedmontese section of the Via Francigena also passes through the area.

== Fishing ==
There are carp, pike, tench, catfish, and various other species. Fishing is managed by the Gruppo Sportivo Dilettantistico Amici della Pesca, which, upon purchase of a permit, allows access to daily fishermen as well.

== Nature protection ==
The lake and the surrounding area are included in the SIC called Lago di Bertignano (Viverone) and pond near the road to Roppolo (code IT1130004), with a total area of 26.17 ha (64.7 acres).
