= Roppolo Castle =

- Castello di Roppolo
- Roppolo, Piedmont, Italy
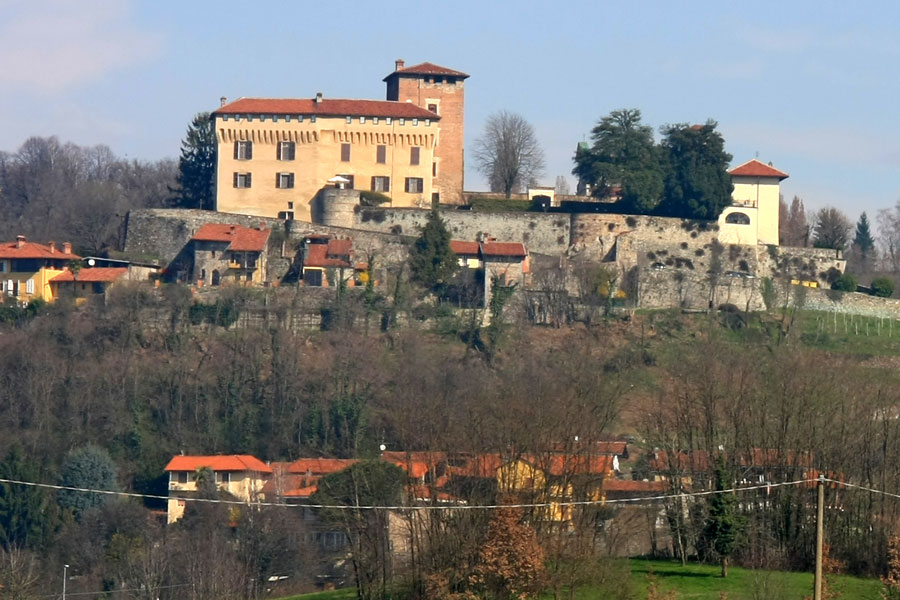
- Roppolo Castle in 2011

Site information
- Type: Castle

Location
- Coordinates: 45°25′20.3″N 8°04′22.8″E

Site history
- Built: 13th-14th century

Roppolo Castle (Italian: Castello di Roppolo) is a castle located in Roppolo, Piedmont, Italy.

== History ==
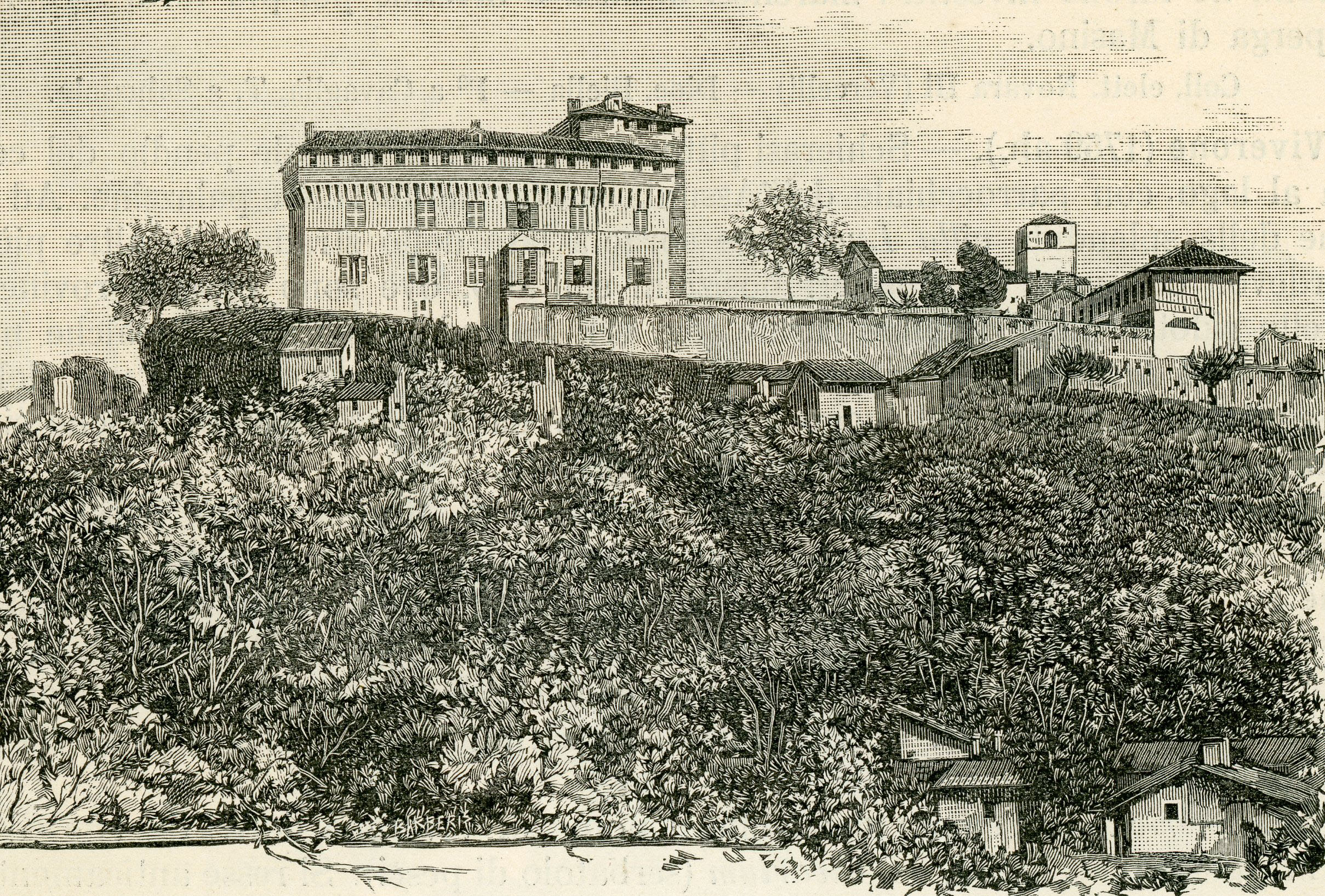
The castle in a woodcut from 1890 by Giuseppe Barberis

The particular strategic position of the site where the castle stands had led to the construction of a fortification as early as the 3rd century AD, which was later used as the foundation for the current building.

After belonging to several local nobles, in 1225 the castle became the property of the Bichieri family, a powerful and wealthy family from Vercelli, who transformed the now dilapidated hilltop fortification into a true medieval castle, which proved very useful to the family during the struggles between Guelphs and Ghibellines.

The castle, along with the nearby village, was then taken over by the Visconti in 1315, who began using it as a noble residence. Later, as happened with nearby Viverone and other villages in the Vercelli area, the territory of Roppolo was barbarously conquered by the condottiero Facino Cane, in the service of the Marquisate of Monferrat.

Roppolo, returned under the realm of the Savoy family in 1427, then became the domain of the Counts of Valperga. The history of the castle is linked to a singular episode: in 1459, after losing a dispute against the rival Ludovico Valperga of Masino, a certain knight Bernardo of Mazzè was placed in armor and walled up alive in the castle. The truthfulness of the event was supposedly confirmed by the discovery, during restoration work carried out in the 20th century, of the remains of a man in armor behind a wall. This event led to the Valperga family of Caluso-Masino being condemned to return the castle and the Roppolo territory to the Savoy family. This sparked a long legal battle, which lasted until 1630, when the Caluso-Masino branch died out, and the Savoy regained full possession of the castle and the village.

In 1632, the castle became a stronghold for Thomas Francis of Savoy against the French invasions. However, when the French allied with the Savoy in 1640, Roppolo was ceded to the Marquis Guido Villa of Cigliano and Giandomenico Doria of Ciriè. In 1730, however, some descendants of the Valperga family claimed— and obtained—ownership of the village and castle once again.

Centuries later, in 1837, the now-declined Valperga family sold the castle to Ignazio Anselmi, a wealthy landowner, who renovated it, transforming the medieval fortress into an elegant country residence. During the Risorgimento period, Anselmi passed the property on to the senator and general Gustavo Mazè de la Roche; later, the castle passed to the Chio family and, more recently, to the Gruner family.

The subsequent owners, the Moransengo family, transformed the building into a hotel in the 1980s. During this period, the castle also housed the Enoteca Regionale della Serra, which was moved elsewhere in 2015. After a period of closure to the public, in 2015 the castle was purchased by the Saletta family, who reopened it to the public in May 2018.
