= San Secondo, Magnano =

Church building in Magnano, Italy

Coordinates: 45.4662°N 8.0114°E

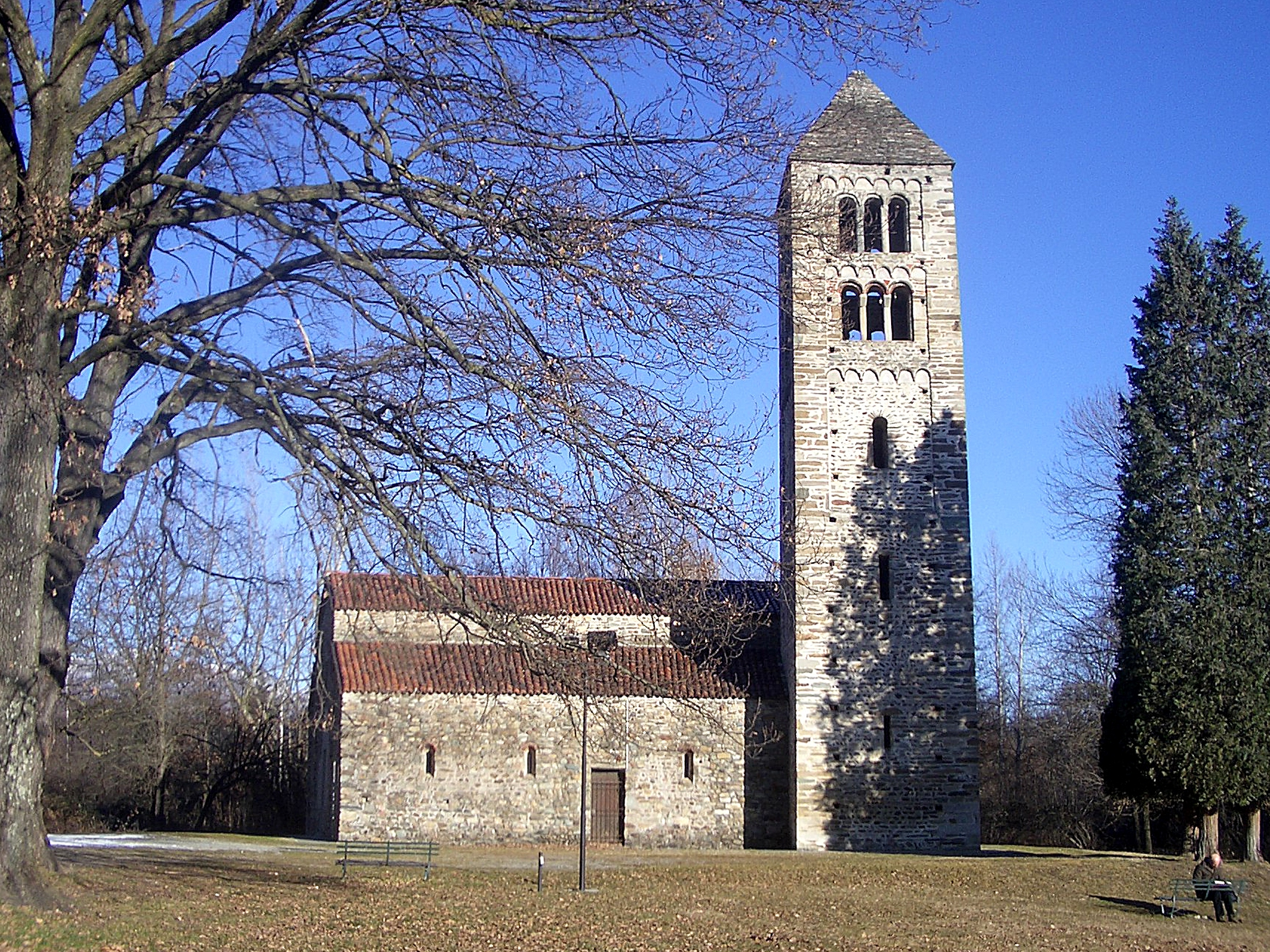
San Secondo

The church of San Secondo di Magnano is built in a wide open space near the Serra d'Ivrea, not far from the Bose monastic community, in the comune (municipality) of Magnano, Italy. It is one of the most interesting examples of Romanesque architecture in the Provincia di Biella and the Canavese.

== History and architecture ==
There used to be an older, small church on the site of today's San Secondo. This church was probably built by the Benedictines. In the first half of the 11th century the structure was raised and enlarged up to its current size. The architecture is typically Romanesque, with a projecting façade. The inside of the church is divided into a nave and two aisles by rectangular pillars with round arch; the ceiling is a truss. The central nave and the left aisle end both with an apse with a small window. The right aisle's apse has probably been demolished to make room for the bell tower, an elegant structure with mullioned windows in its upper section. At the bottom of the right aisle, on the bell tower's wall, there is a fresco from the 13th or 14th century, representing a Crucifixion with the Virgin and Saint John.

The church was originally built in the ancient hamlet of Magnano, but at the end of the 14th century the village moved to Magnano's current location. At the beginning of the 17th century the parish church was moved to the new church of Santa Marta and there was no reason to preserve the old Romanesque building, so it was decided, in 1606, to demolish San Secondo in order to use its materials to build the new church. Devotees, however, objected successfully to this decision. Baroque decorations were added. During the 19th century the church was abandoned again. In 1968 the Province of Vercelli decided to restore the building, with its original Romanesque appearance.

== Gallery ==
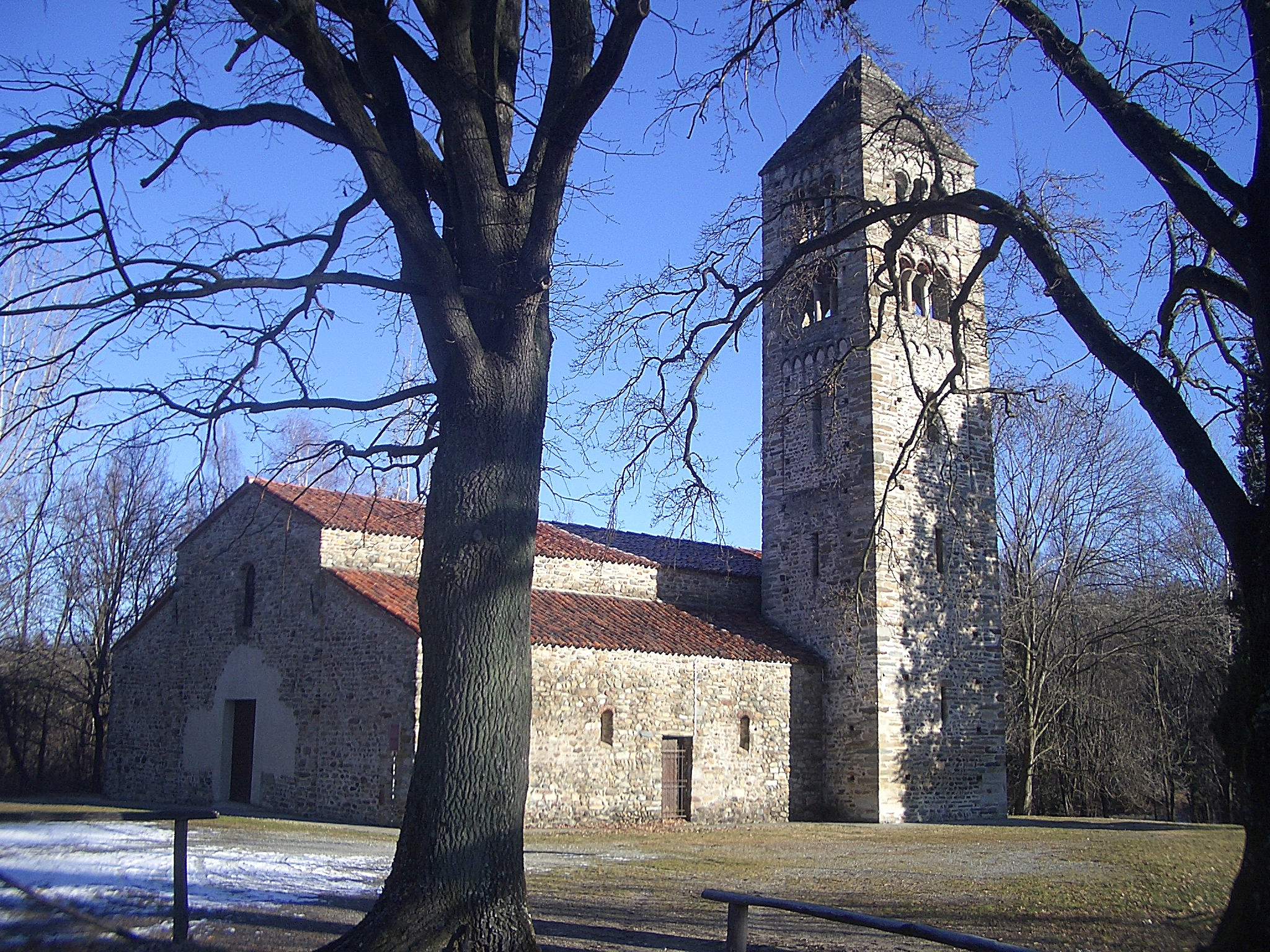
Belltower and right side

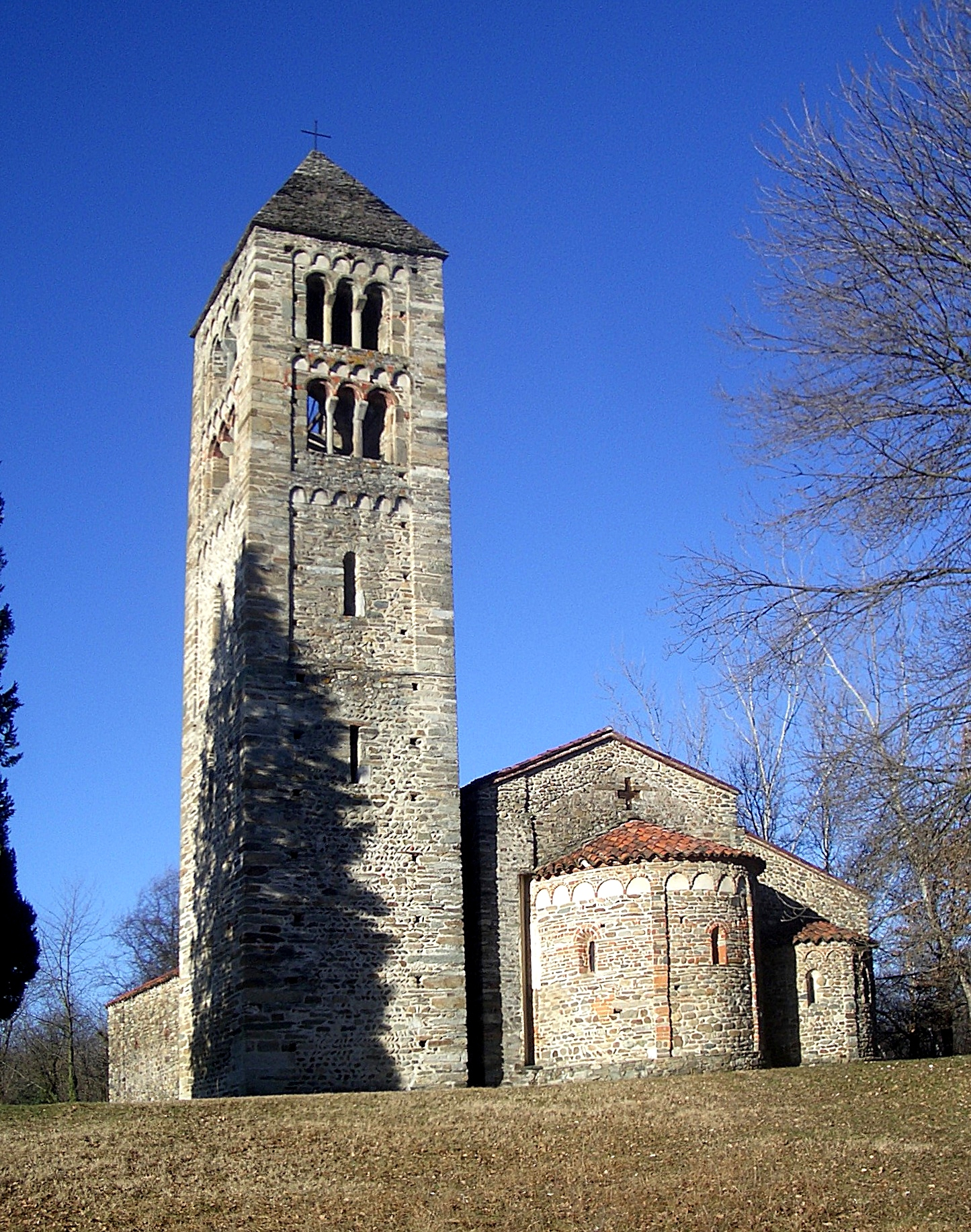
Belltower and apse

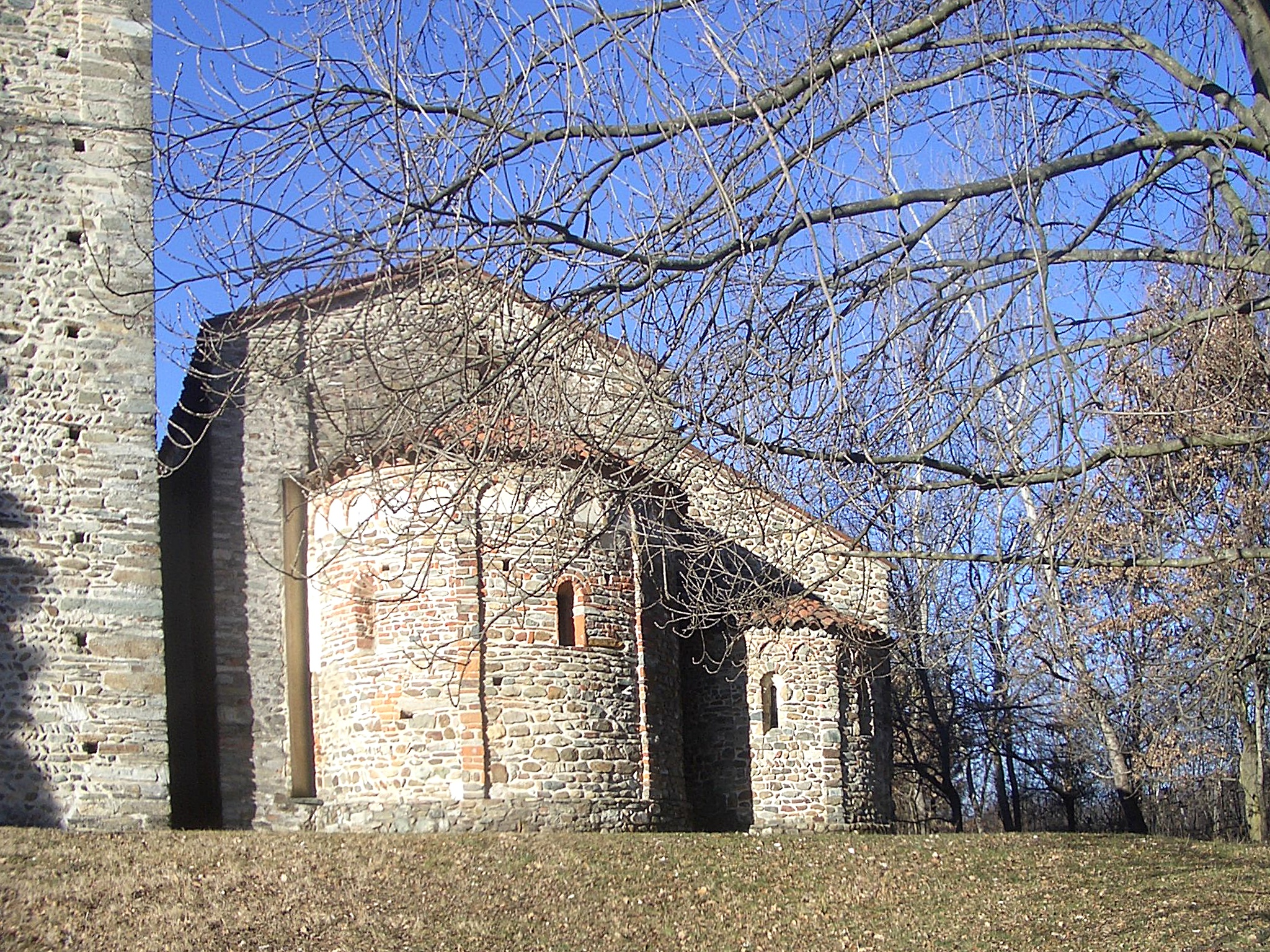
The apse

== Bibliography ==
- Comunità monastica di Bose (a cura della) La Serra: Chiese Romaniche, edizioni Qiqajon, 1999

== See also ==
- CoEur - In the heart of European paths
- Via Francigena
- Path of Saint Charles
