= Santi Pietro e Lorenzo, Piverone =

Church in Piedmont, Italy

Santi Pietro e Lorenzo
- Chiesa dei Santi Pietro e Lorenzo (Italian)
- Santi Pietro e Lorenzo, Piverone in 2013
- Click on the map for a fullscreen view
- 45°26′52.36″N 8°00′27.62″E
- Location: Piverone
- Country: Italy
- Denomination: Roman Catholic

Architecture
- Functional status: Active

Administration
- Diocese: Diocese of Ivrea

Santi Pietro e Lorenzo is a Roman Catholic church located in Piverone, Italy.

== History ==
The church dates back to the Romanesque period and may be identified with the ancient community church that existed before the founding of the medieval borgo franco of Piverone. The building underwent several alterations as early as the first half of the 13th century. Over the centuries, the structure was modified and embellished with architectural and decorative features from later periods. The façade features 16th-century Baroque elements, while most of the interior furnishings date from the 18th and 19th century.

== Description ==
The church feautrues a restrained Baroque style.

The interior preserves two 16th-century frescoes: one depicting the Madonna and Child with Saint Anne, attributed to an artist from the circle of Defendente Ferrari, and another, located on the interior façade, depicting Saint Peter between Saint Sebastian and Saint Roch.
