= Enzo Bianchi =

Italian writer, monk and theologian (1943–2026)

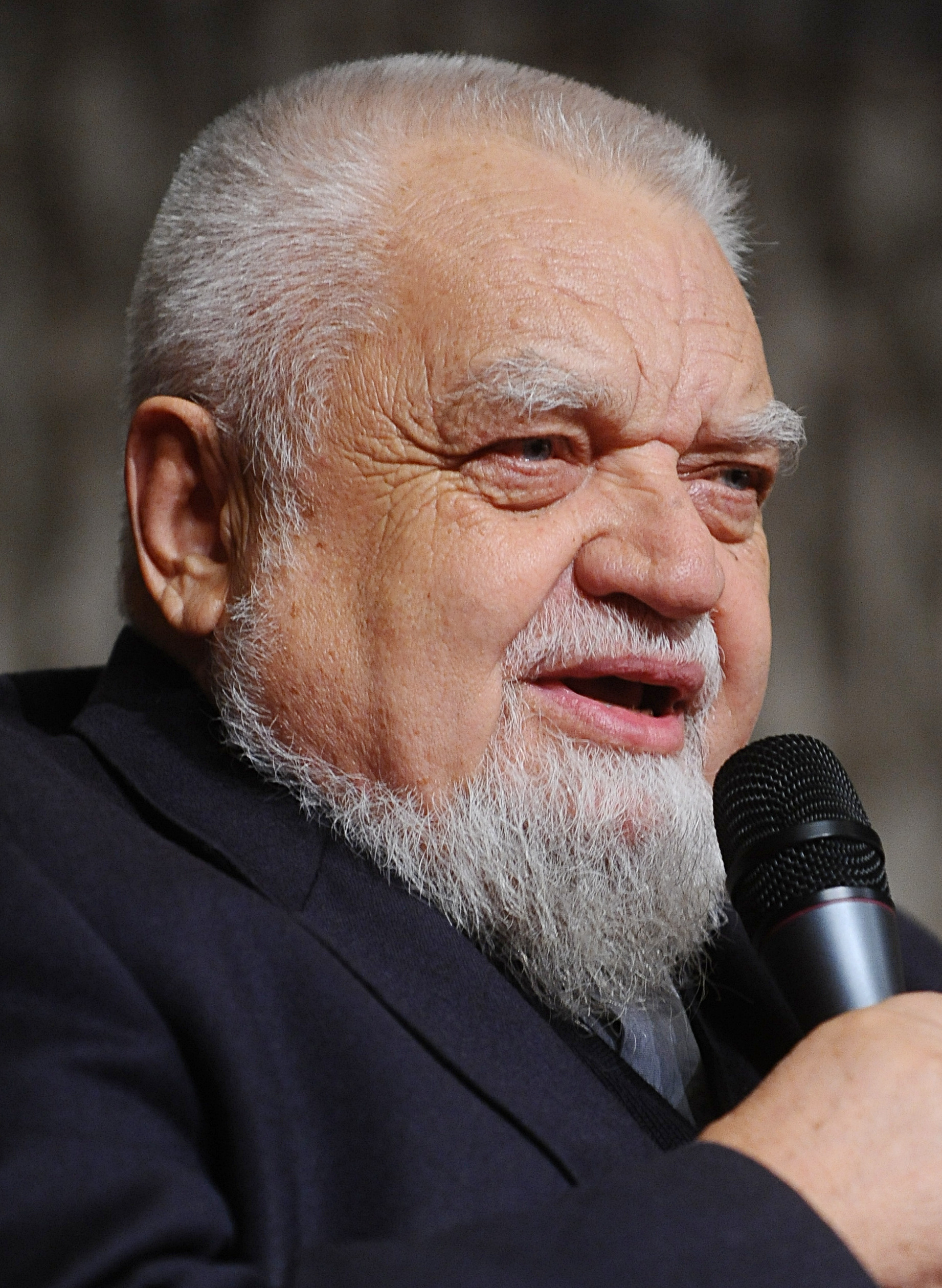
The prior of the monastic community of Bose Enzo Bianchi at the Cooperation room in Trento for an evening organized by Alberto Pacher to conclude his commitment in politics

Enzo Bianchi (3 March 1943 – 1 September 2026) was an Italian Catholic layman who founded the Bose Monastic Community and served as its first prior from 1965 to 2017.

== Biography ==
Enzo Bianchi was born in Castel Boglione, Italy, on 3 March 1943. He earned a diploma in accountancy and then studied economics at the University of Turin.

In late 1965, he moved to an isolated farmhouse in the hamlet of Bose in Magnano in the Province of Biella. In October 1968, two Catholics, a Protestant minister, and a lay female Protestant, formed the Bose Monastic Community. He was also friends with Cardinal Michele Pellegrino. With Bianchi as founder and first prior, and based on the rules he wrote, it welcomed men and women, both Catholics and Protestants, who agreed to live in community, maintain celibacy, and devote themselves to prayer and work.

In August 2004, Bianchi was part of the Vatican delegation that delivered a 16th-century icon of Our Lady of Kazan to the Russian Orthodox Church.

Bianchi was also appointed an expert to assemblies of the Synod of Bishops in 2008, 2012, and 2018. On 22 July 2014, Pope Francis named him a consultor to the Pontifical Council for Promoting Christian Unity.

On 26 December 2016, he announced his resignation as prior of the community, effective from 25 January 2017. He was succeeded on 26 January 2017 by Luciano Manicardi, who had been vice-prior. On 30 January 2022, Sabino Chialà was elected as prior.

From 6 December 2019 to 6 January 2020, the Vatican conducted an apostolic visitation of the Bose Monastic Community regarding issues of "the exercise of the authority, government management and fraternal climate". The visitors were Guillermo León Arboleda Tamayo, a Benedictine abbot, Amedeo Cencini, a Canossian consultor to the Congregation for Institutes of Consecrated Life and Societies of Apostolic Life, and Anne-Emmanuelle Devêche, a Cistercian abbess. Following their investigation, the Holy See issued a decree on 13 May 2020, signed by the Cardinal Secretary of State, Pietro Parolin, and approved by Pope Francis, ordering Bianchi and three others to "separate from Bose and move to another place". The community released the contents of that decree on 26 May 2020, indicating that not all of those named had complied.

Bianchi died from kidney failure in Turin on 1 September 2026 at the age of 83.
