= Purcarel =

Natural hollow in Biella, Piedmont, Italy

Coordinates: 45.4247°N 8.0544°E

Pùrcarel quarry is the name of a little natural circular hollow, about 60 metres in diameter, located in the woodlands of the little Bertignano Lake, near Viverone, Province of Biella in Piedmont, Italy. The soil rich in clay (typical of the moraines) occasionally turn the basin in a pond, although not possessing affluents.

The site is of archaeological interest. It was the seat of a garrison-prehistoric dwelling, consisting of huts resting on twelve heaps of stones, still visible on the border.

Archaeological excavations unearthed ceramic materials, related to two different eras, the late Neolithic and the Bronze Age. It is common opinion of the connection with two prehistoric canoes found in nearby Bertignano Lake, and stored at the Antiquities Museum in Turin. The Pùrcarel name is of unknown origin.

Other important archaeological remains can be found at the nearby Monte Orsetto and inside a wooded area near Peverano (Roppolo).
