= Zimone =

- Comune
- Comune di Zimone
- Coat of arms

- Location within Italy Location within Piedmont
- Coordinates: 45°27′N 8°0′E
- Country: Italy
- Region: Piedmont
- Province: Biella (BI)

Government
  - Mayor: Piergiorgio Givonetti

Area
  - Total: 2.9 km^{2} (1.1 sq mi)
- Elevation: 465 m (1,526 ft)

Population (31 December 2010)
  - Total: 425
  - Density: 150/km^{2} (380/sq mi)
- Demonym: Zimonesi
- Time zone: UTC+1 (CET)
  - Summer (DST): UTC+2 (CEST)
- Postal code: 13040
- Dialing code: 015

Zimone (Zimon in Piedmontese) is a comune (municipality) in the Province of Biella in the Italian region Piedmont, located about 50 kilometres (31 mi) northeast of Turin and about 14 kilometres (9 mi) southwest of Biella.

Zimone borders the following municipalities: Cerrione, Magnano, Piverone, Roppolo, Viverone.
