= Magnano =

- Comune
- Comune di Magnano
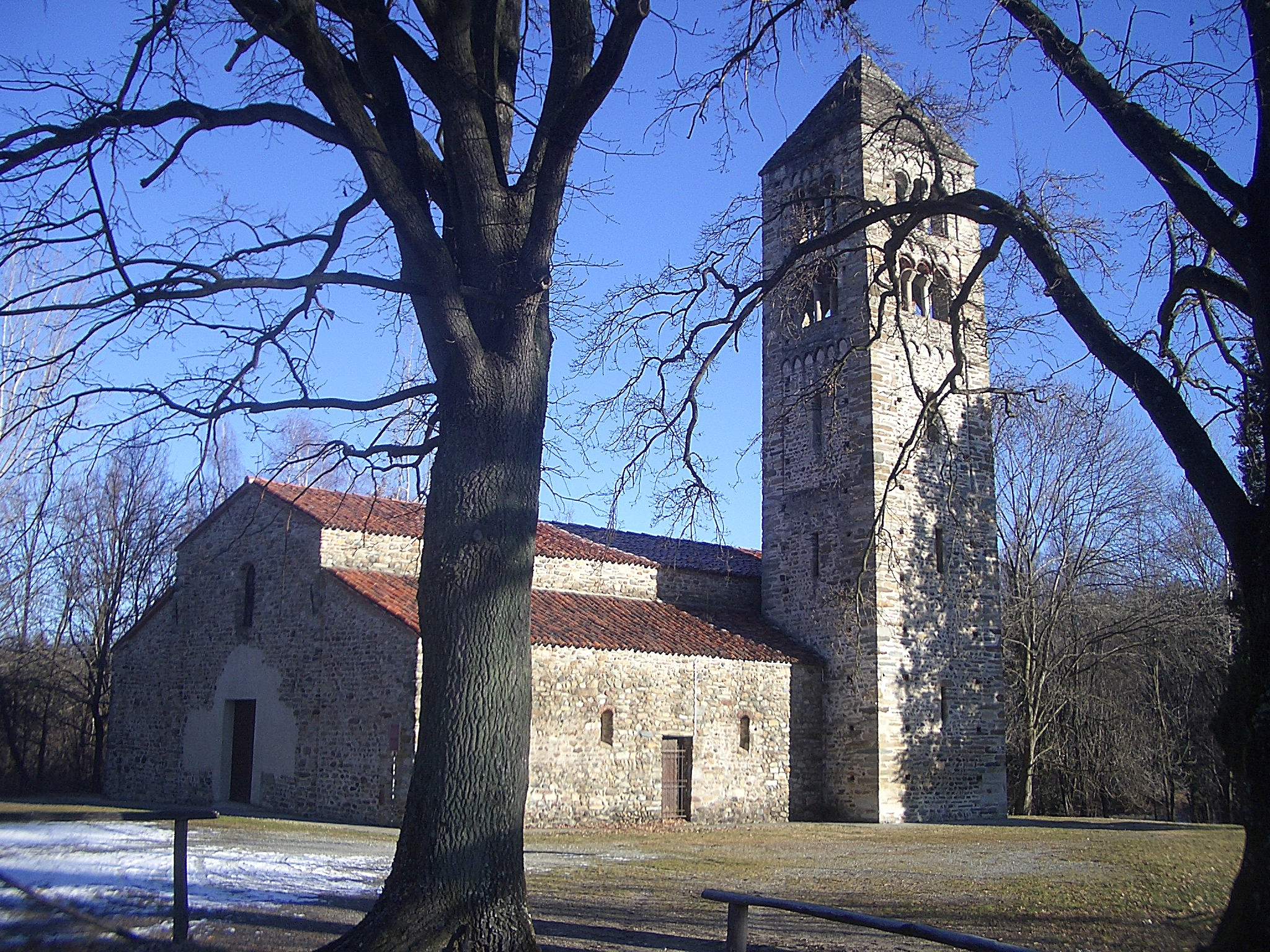
- Romanesque San Secondo church of Magnano.

- Coat of arms

- Location within Italy Location within Piedmont
- Coordinates: 45°29′N 8°5′E
- Country: Italy
- Region: Piedmont
- Province: Biella (BI)
- Frazioni: Bose, Broglina, Carrera, Piletta, San Sudario, Tamagno

Government
  - Mayor: Anna Grisoglio

Area
  - Total: 10.5 km^{2} (4.1 sq mi)
- Elevation: 543 m (1,781 ft)

Population (31 December 2010)
  - Total: 387
  - Density: 36.9/km^{2} (95.5/sq mi)
- Demonym: Magnanesi
- Time zone: UTC+1 (CET)
  - Summer (DST): UTC+2 (CEST)
- Postal code: 13887
- Dialing code: 015
- Website: Official website

Magnano is a comune (municipality) in the Province of Biella in the Italian region Piedmont, located about 60 kilometres (37 mi) northeast of Turin and about 9 kilometres (6 mi) south of Biella.

Magnano borders the following municipalities: Bollengo, Cerrione, Palazzo Canavese, Piverone, Torrazzo, Zimone, Zubiena.

== Culture ==
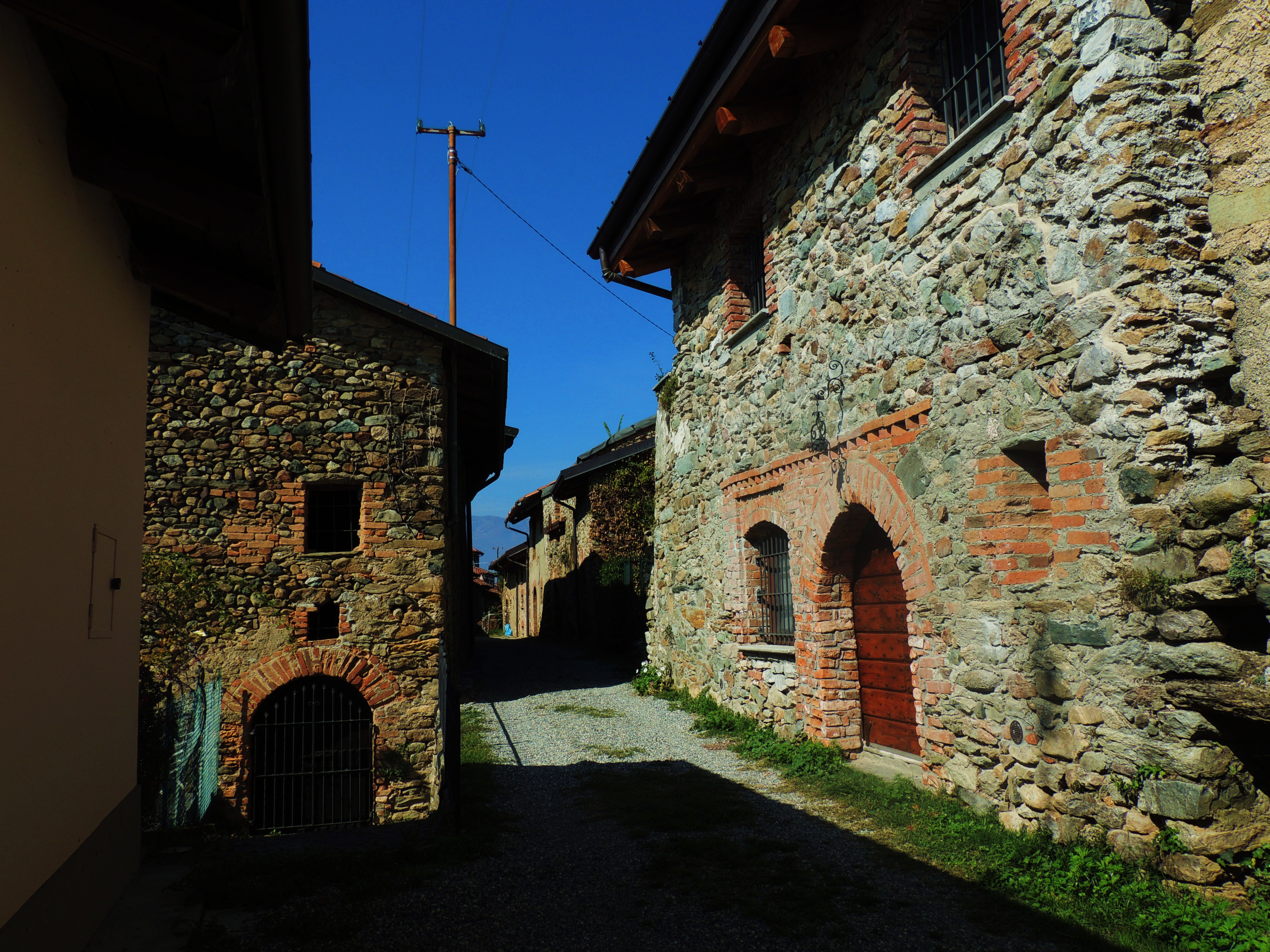
View of Magnano’s old town and Ricetto

Musica Antica a Magnano is a non-profit association founded in 1986 to promote a festival offering an opportunity to hear historically informed performances of early music on original instruments. The Festival concerts are held in August and early September in either a 12th-century church San Secondo or in the town's 18th-century church. The latter also houses an organ built in 1794 by Giovanni Bruna and restored by Italo Marzi.

== See also ==
- Bose Monastic Community, an ecumenical community founded by Enzo Bianchi in 1965 at Bose, a frazione in the commune of Magnano
- Lancia d'Oro, a men's professional golf tournament held in Italy from 1962 to 1976 in Magnano
