= Palazzo Canavese =

- Comune
- Comune di Palazzo Canavese
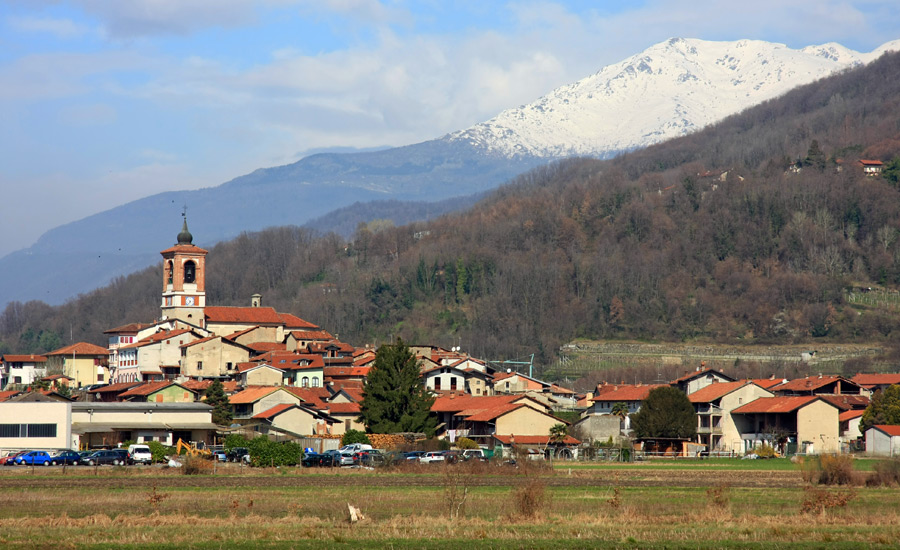

- Coat of arms

- Location within Italy Location within Piedmont
- Coordinates: 45°27′N 7°59′E
- Country: Italy
- Region: Piedmont
- Metropolitan city: Turin (TO)

Government
  - Mayor: Amanda Prelle

Area
  - Total: 5.1 km^{2} (2.0 sq mi)
- Elevation: 248 m (814 ft)

Population (31 December 2010)
  - Total: 850
  - Density: 170/km^{2} (430/sq mi)
- Demonym: Palazzesi
- Time zone: UTC+1 (CET)
  - Summer (DST): UTC+2 (CEST)
- Postal code: 10010
- Dialing code: 0125

Palazzo Canavese is a comune (municipality) in the Metropolitan City of Turin in the Italian region Piedmont, located about 50 kilometres (31 mi) northeast of Turin.

Palazzo Canavese borders the following municipalities: Bollengo, Piverone, Magnano, Albiano d'Ivrea, and Azeglio.
