= Bessa Natural Reserve =

Nature reserve in Piedmont, Italy

- Riserva naturale speciale della Bessa
- IUCN category IV (habitat/species management area)
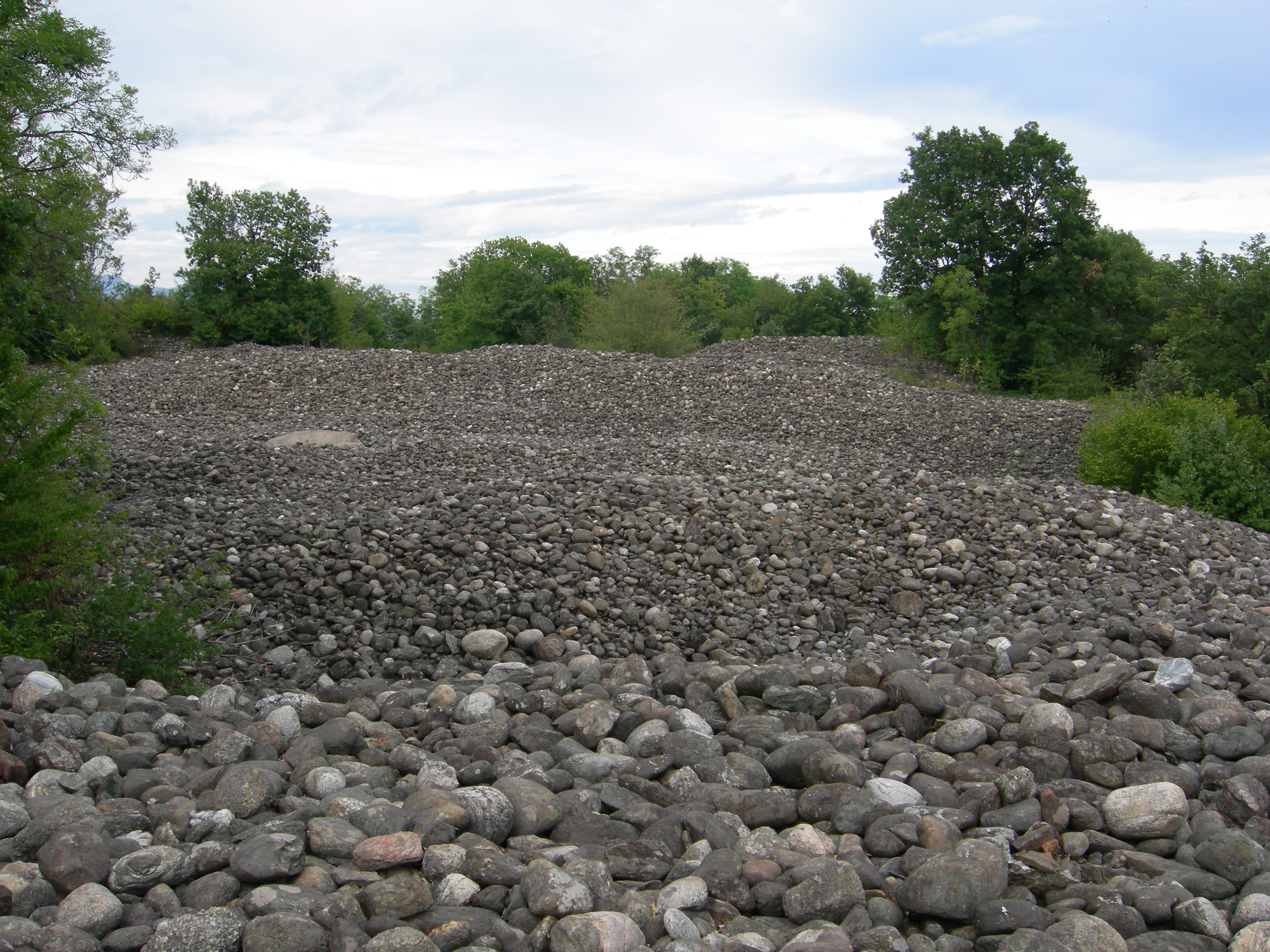
- The pebbles pile-up

- Location within Italy
- Location: Piedmont, Italy
- Nearest city: Cerrione
- Coordinates: 45.4850°N 8.0372°E
- Area: 7.5 km^{2} (2.9 sq mi)
- Established: 1985

The Bessa Natural Reserve, established in 1985, is near Biella; it is 7.5 km² wide and it is part of the Baragge Natural Reserve.

== Geography and geology ==
The reserve is north delimited by the remains of a morainic hill of the Early Pleistocene and the Quaternary floods of the Elvo river; it is south delimited by another moraine and by the stream Olobbia.

The Bessa gold field was originated by the erosion and the sedimentation of the rivers and of the Aosta Valley glacier, which also transported the great glacial erratics that can be found in the park.

== History ==
The gold field area, dating back to 2nd-1st century B.C., is made by two fluviale terracing covered with pebbles, sand and gravel, wastes of the mining activity.

On many glacial erratics petroglyphs can be found, especially cup marks. Since 5th-4th century B.C. the area was dominated by the Salassi.

Between 143 and 140 B.C. the area was conquered by the Roman legions commanded by Appius Claudius Pulcher and the mining activity was managed by the publicans.

The historian Strabo says that in the second half of the 1st century B.C. the gold fields were abandoned (or finished) and the Roman gold came from the Iberia and Gaul.

== Gallery ==
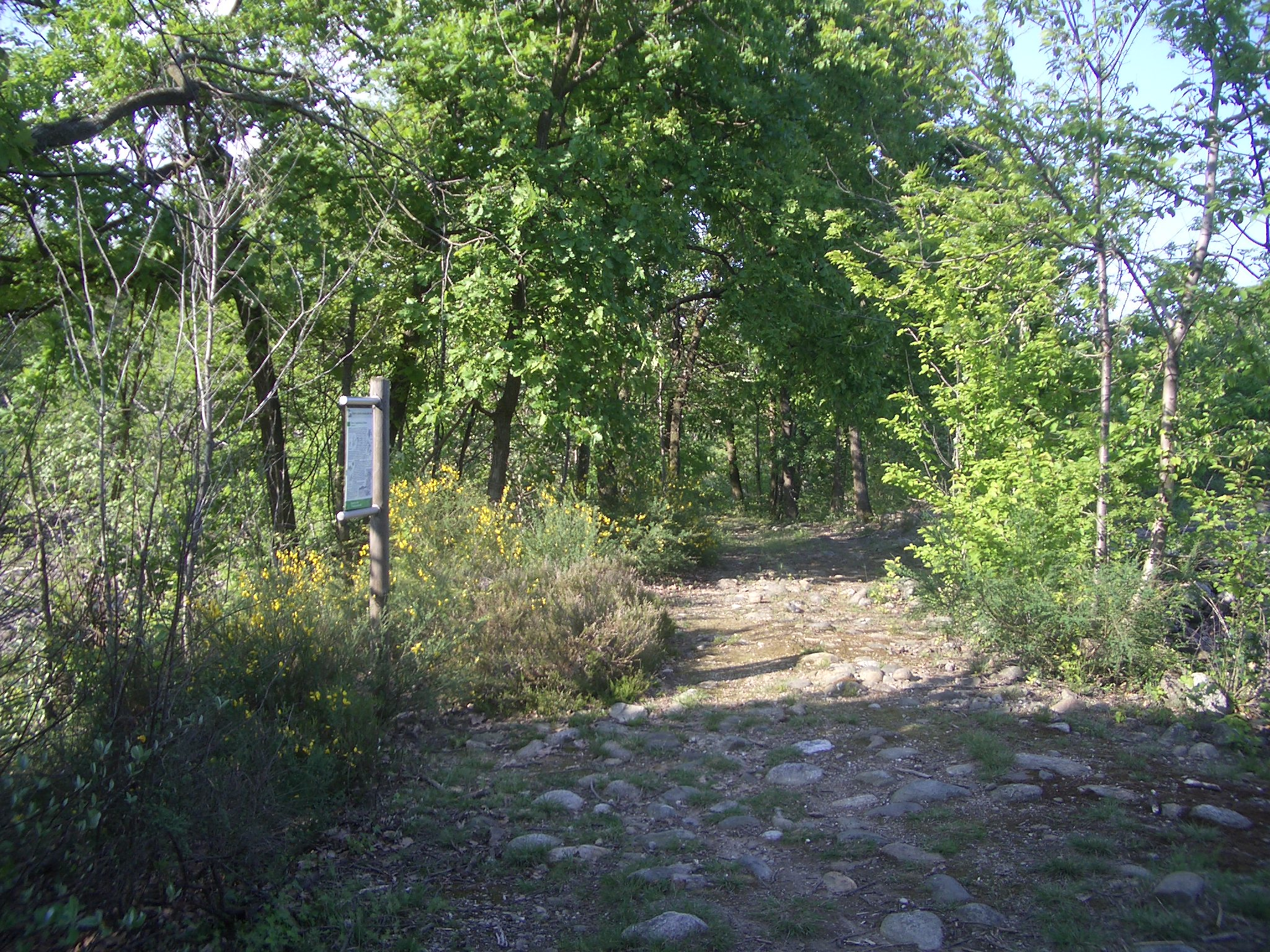
The path called Ciapei Parfundà

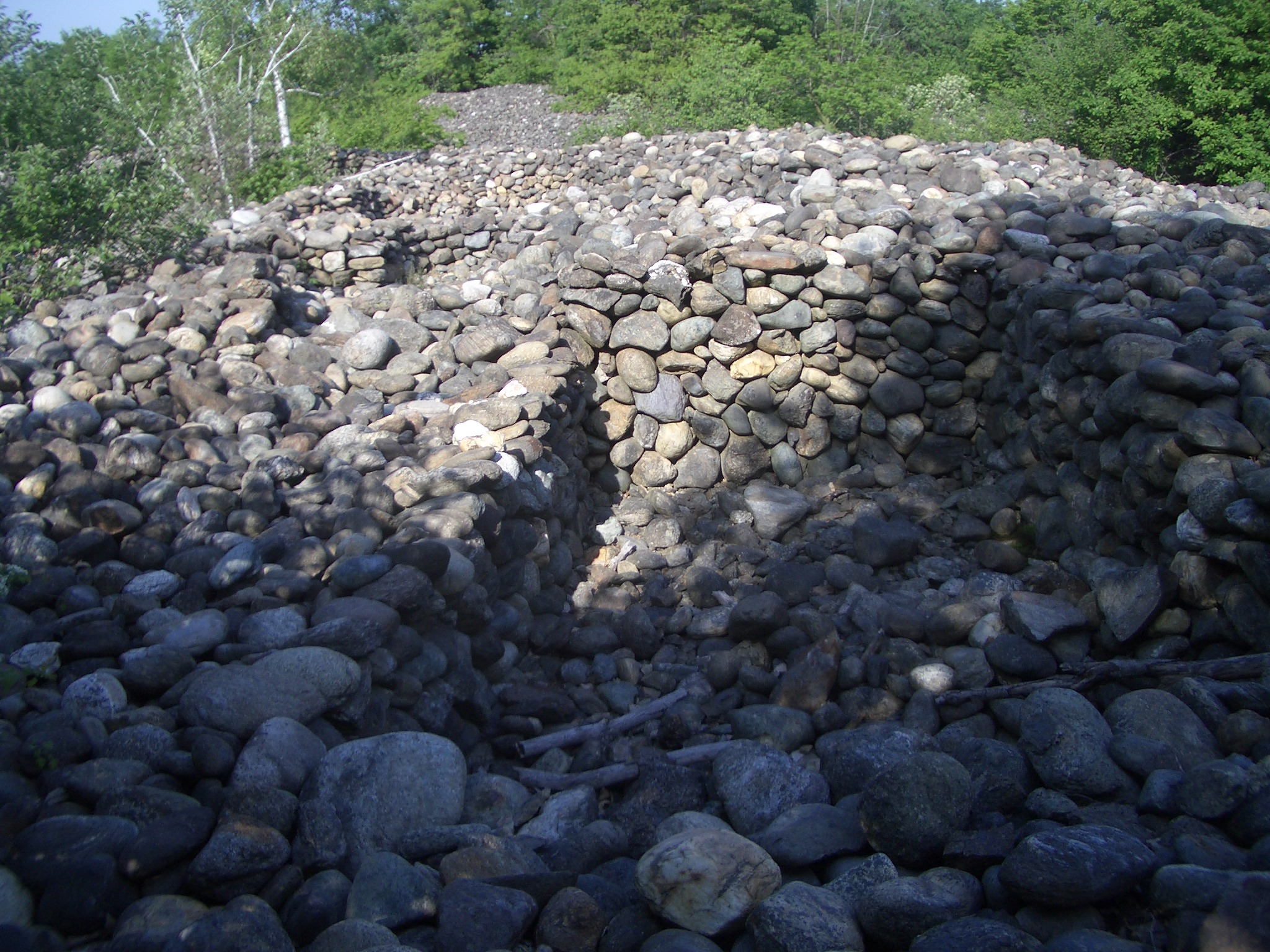
Remains of the constructions

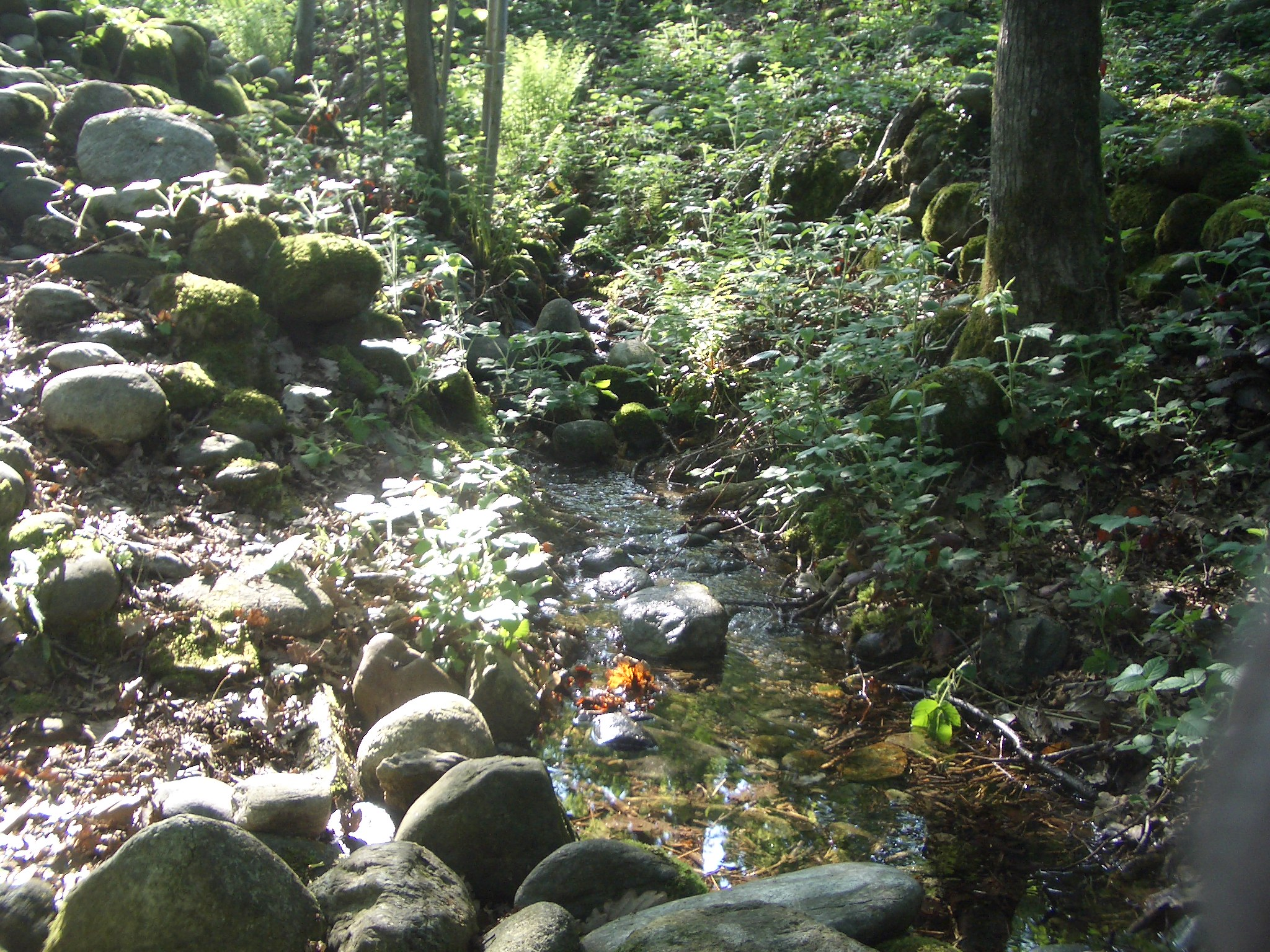
Spring between the stones called Funta-na dla canala

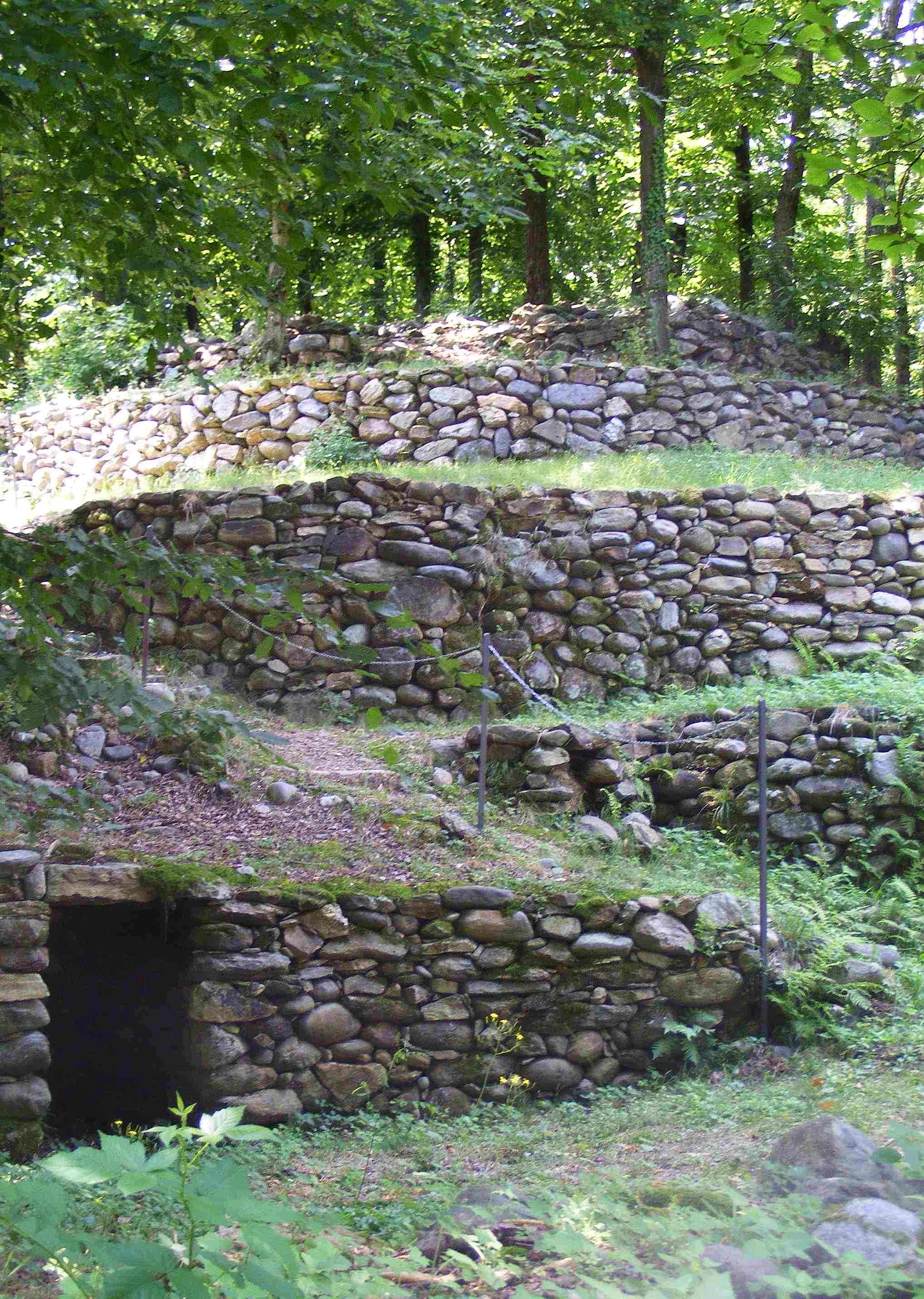
The Castelliere di Mongrando old and enigmatic building

== See also ==
- CoEur - In the heart of European paths
- Path of Saint Charles
