= Piverone =

- Comune
- Comune di Piverone
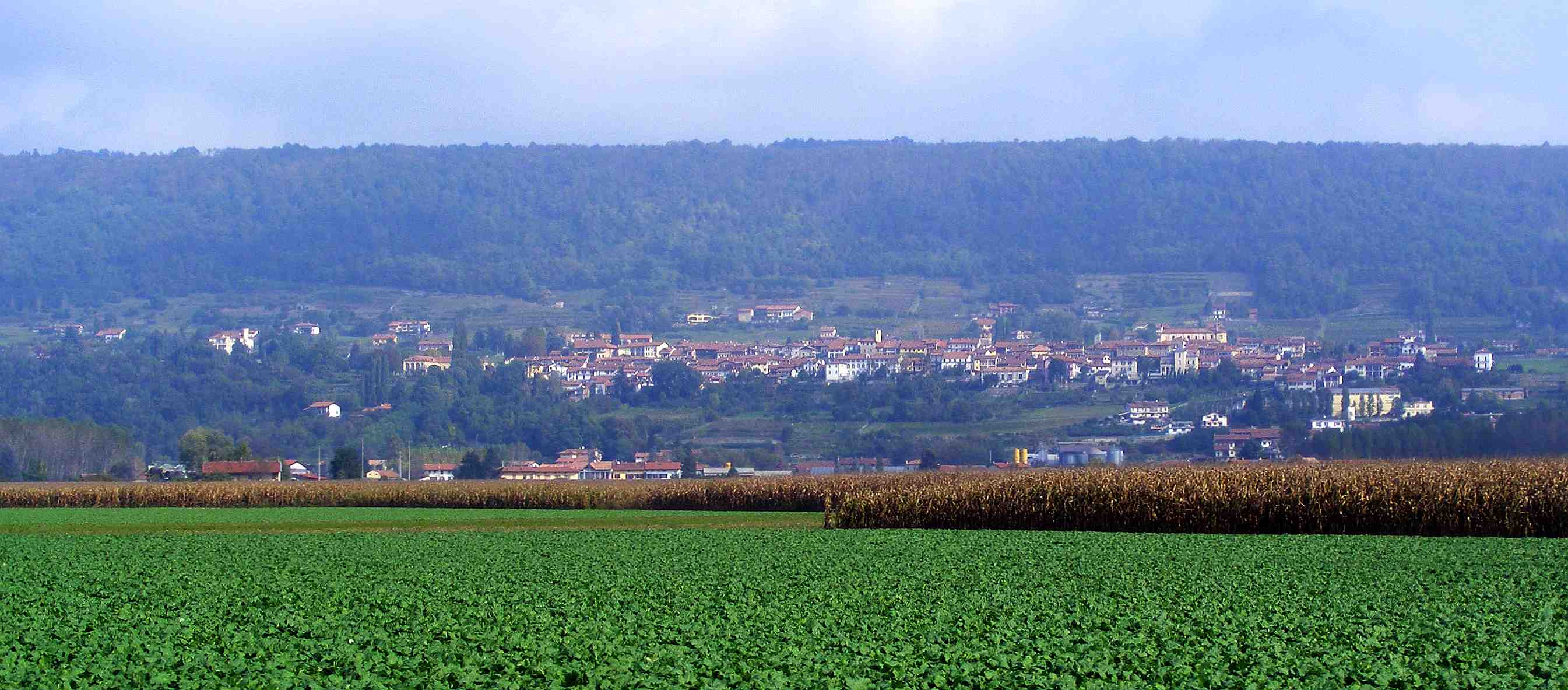

- Coat of arms

- Location within Italy Location within Piedmont
- Coordinates: 45°27′N 8°0′E
- Country: Italy
- Region: Piedmont
- Metropolitan city: Turin (TO)

Government
  - Mayor: Alessandro Maria Fasolo

Area
  - Total: 11.1 km^{2} (4.3 sq mi)
- Elevation: 295 m (968 ft)

Population (31 December 2010)
  - Total: 1,381
  - Density: 124/km^{2} (322/sq mi)
- Demonym: Piveronesi
- Time zone: UTC+1 (CET)
  - Summer (DST): UTC+2 (CEST)
- Postal code: 10010
- Dialing code: 0125
- Website: Official website

Piverone is a comune (municipality) in the Metropolitan City of Turin in the Italian region Piedmont, located about 50 miles (80 km) northeast of Turin.

Piverone borders the following municipalities: Palazzo Canavese, Zimone, Magnano, Albiano d'Ivrea, Azeglio, and Viverone.

The village is home to Santi Pietro e Lorenzo, a parish church originally dating back to the Romanesque period.

== Twin towns ==
- Dég, Hungary
