= Roppolo =

- Comune
- Comune di Roppolo
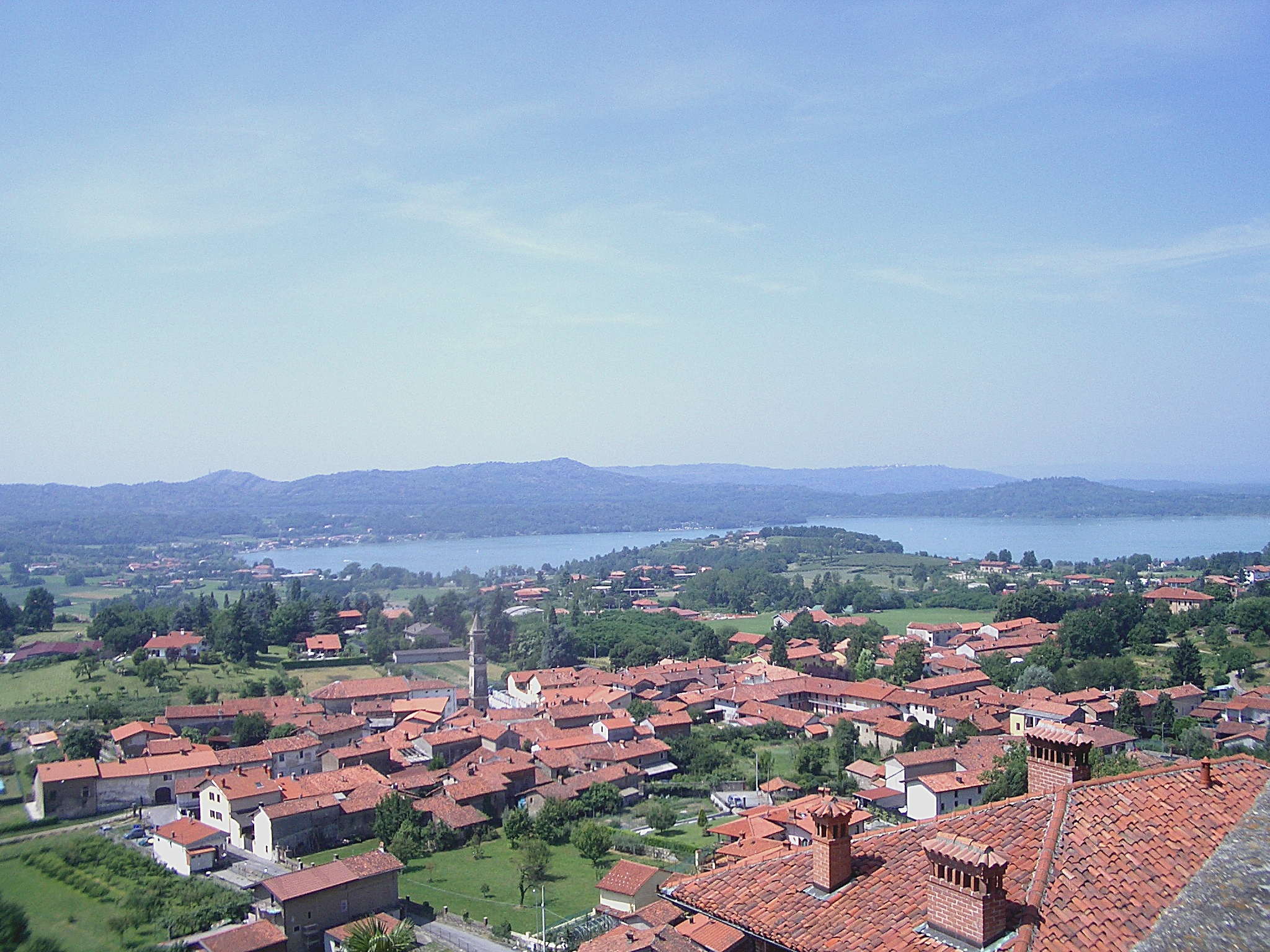
- Roppolo seen from its castle

- Coat of arms

- Location within Italy Location within Piedmont
- Coordinates: 45°25′N 8°4′E
- Country: Italy
- Region: Piedmont
- Province: Biella (BI)
- Frazioni: Babò, Borgata Salomone, Castello, Comuna di Roppolo, Morzano, Peverano, Pioglio, San Vitale

Government
  - Mayor: Renato Corona

Area
  - Total: 8.7 km^{2} (3.4 sq mi)
- Elevation: 307 m (1,007 ft)

Population (31 December 2018)
  - Total: 880
  - Density: 100/km^{2} (260/sq mi)
- Demonym: Roppolesi
- Time zone: UTC+1 (CET)
  - Summer (DST): UTC+2 (CEST)
- Postal code: 13883
- Dialing code: 0161

Roppolo is a comune (municipality) in the Province of Biella in the Piedmont region of north-western Italy. It is located about 50 kilometres (31 mi) northeast of Turin and about 15 kilometres (9.3 mi) south of Biella.

The municipality lies on the southern slopes of the Ivrea glacial ridge, west of Lake of Viverone. Roppolo borders the following municipalities: Alice Castello, Cavaglià, Cerrione, Dorzano, Salussola, Viverone, and Zimone.

The settlement is first mentioned in a document dating from 936 AD. It is home to Roppolo Castle, a fortified structure largely built during the 14th century. The local economy is based primarily on agriculture, particularly wine production and the cultivation of kiwifruit.
