= Bose Monastic Community =

Ecumenical community in Bose, Magnano

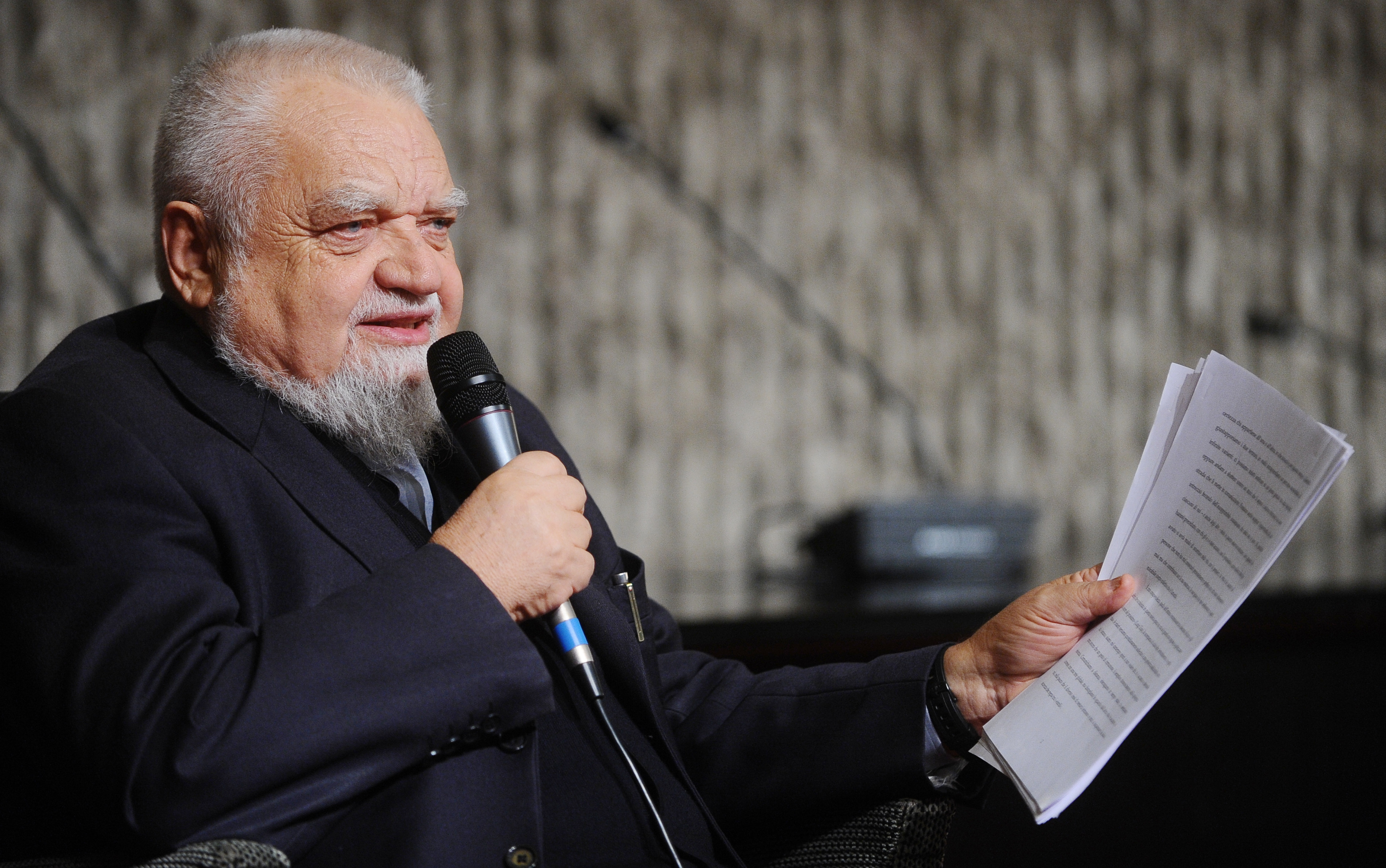
Enzo Bianchi, founder and first prior of the Bose Monastic Community

The Bose Monastic Community (Italian: Monastero di Bose) is an ecumenical community founded by Enzo Bianchi in 1965 at Bose, a frazione in the comune of Magnano, Italy. In 2020 the Holy See ordered four members, including Bianchi, to separate from the community.

== History ==
On 8 December 1965, Bianchi decided to start living in a rented house in Bose, where he lived alone for three years. He visited several communities during this time, including Tamié Abbey, Mount Athos, and the Ecumenical Taizé Community.

On 17 November 1967, the local bishop prohibited public liturgical celebrations in Bose, which the Bose community attributed to be due to the frequent presence of non-Catholics. Pellegrino intervened to remove the interdict on 29 June 1968. In October 1968, two Catholics, a Protestant minister, and another female Protestant, joined Bianchi in Bose. Pellegrino approved the community's rule on 22 April 1973.

On 26 December 2016, Bianchi announced his resignation as prior of the community, effective from 25 January 2017. Luciano Manicardi, who had been vice-prior, was elected to succeed him on 26 January 2017. On 30 January 2022, Sabino Chialà was elected as prior and resigned in 2025 to work in the Vatican's Dicastery for the Eastern Churches.

From 6 December 2019 to 6 January 2020, the Vatican conducted an apostolic visitation of the Bose Monastic Community regarding issues of "the exercise of the authority, government management and fraternal climate". The visitors were Guillermo León Arboleda Tamayo, a Benedictine abbot, Amedeo Cencini, a Canossian consultor to the Congregation for Institutes of Consecrated Life and Societies of Apostolic Life, and Anne-Emmanuelle Devêche, a Cistercian abbess. Following their investigation, the Holy See issued a decree on 13 May 2020, signed by Cardinal Secretary of State Pietro Parolin and approved by Pope Francis, ordering Bianchi and three others to "separate from Bose and move to another place". The community released the contents of that decree on 26 May 2020 indicating that not all of those named had complied.
