= Viverone =

Viverone Vivron (Piedmontese)
- Comune
- Comune di Viverone
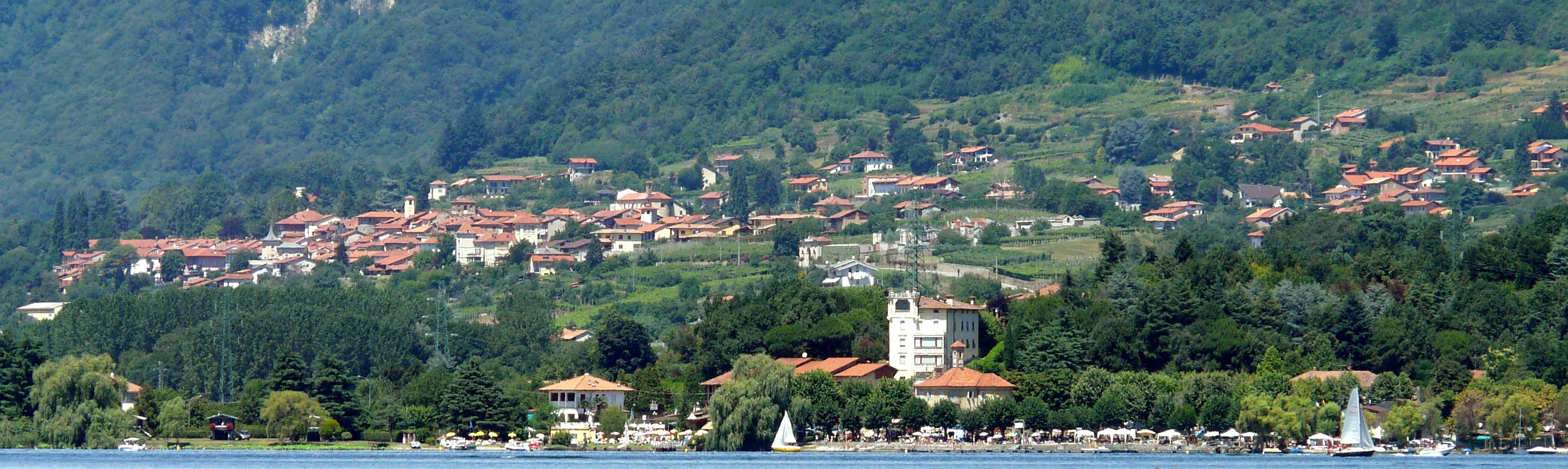
- View of Viverone

- Location within Italy Location within Piedmont
- Coordinates: 45°25′N 8°4′E
- Country: Italy
- Region: Piedmont
- Province: Province of Biella (BI)

Government
  - Mayor: Massimo Pastoris

Area
  - Total: 12.4 km^{2} (4.8 sq mi)
- Elevation: 287 m (942 ft)

Population (Nov. 2025)
  - Total: 1,323
  - Density: 107/km^{2} (276/sq mi)
- Demonym: Viveronesi
- Time zone: UTC+1 (CET)
  - Summer (DST): UTC+2 (CEST)
- Postal code: 13886
- Dialing code: 0161
- ISTAT code: 096080

Viverone (Piedmontese: Vivron) is a comune (municipality) in the Province of Biella in the Italian region of Piedmont, located about 50 kilometres (31 mi) northeast of Turin and about 15 kilometres (9 mi) south of Biella. It is on the shore of Lago di Viverone. As of 30 November 2025, it had a population of 1,323 and an area of 12.4 square kilometres (4.8 mi^{2}).

Viverone borders the following municipalities: Alice Castello, Azeglio, Borgo d'Ale, Piverone, Roppolo, Zimone.

== Demographic evolution ==
Historical population

Year	Pop.	±%
1861	1,541	—
1871	1,661	+7.8%
1881	1,787	+7.6%
1901	2,023	+13.2%
1911	1,857	−8.2%
1921	1,790	−3.6%

Year	Pop.	±%
1931	1,575	−12.0%
1936	1,492	−5.3%
1951	1,404	−5.9%
1961	1,442	+2.7%
1971	1,428	−1.0%
1981	1,410	−1.3%

Year	Pop.	±%
1991	1,351	−4.2%
2001	1,417	+4.9%
2011	1,423	+0.4%
2021	1,353	−4.9%

Source: Data from ISTAT

== World Heritage Site ==
It is home to one or more prehistoric pile-dwelling (or stilt house) settlements that are part of the Prehistoric Pile dwellings around the Alps UNESCO World Heritage Site.

== Twin towns ==
Viverone is twinned with:

- Povljana, Croatia

== See also ==
- Purcarel, location at Bertignano Lake
- Lake Bertignano
