= Lake Viverone =

Lake in Italy

Lake Viverone (Italian: Lago di Viverone, Piedmontese: Lagh dël Vivron) is the third largest lake in Piedmont, Italy. It is located between the northeasternmost part of the Canavese area (eastern Eporediese) and the southernmost part of the Biellese area; it takes its name from the municipality of the same name to which it mostly belongs.

== Geography ==
Lake Viverone
- Lago di Viverone (Italian); Lagh dël Vivron (Piedmontese)
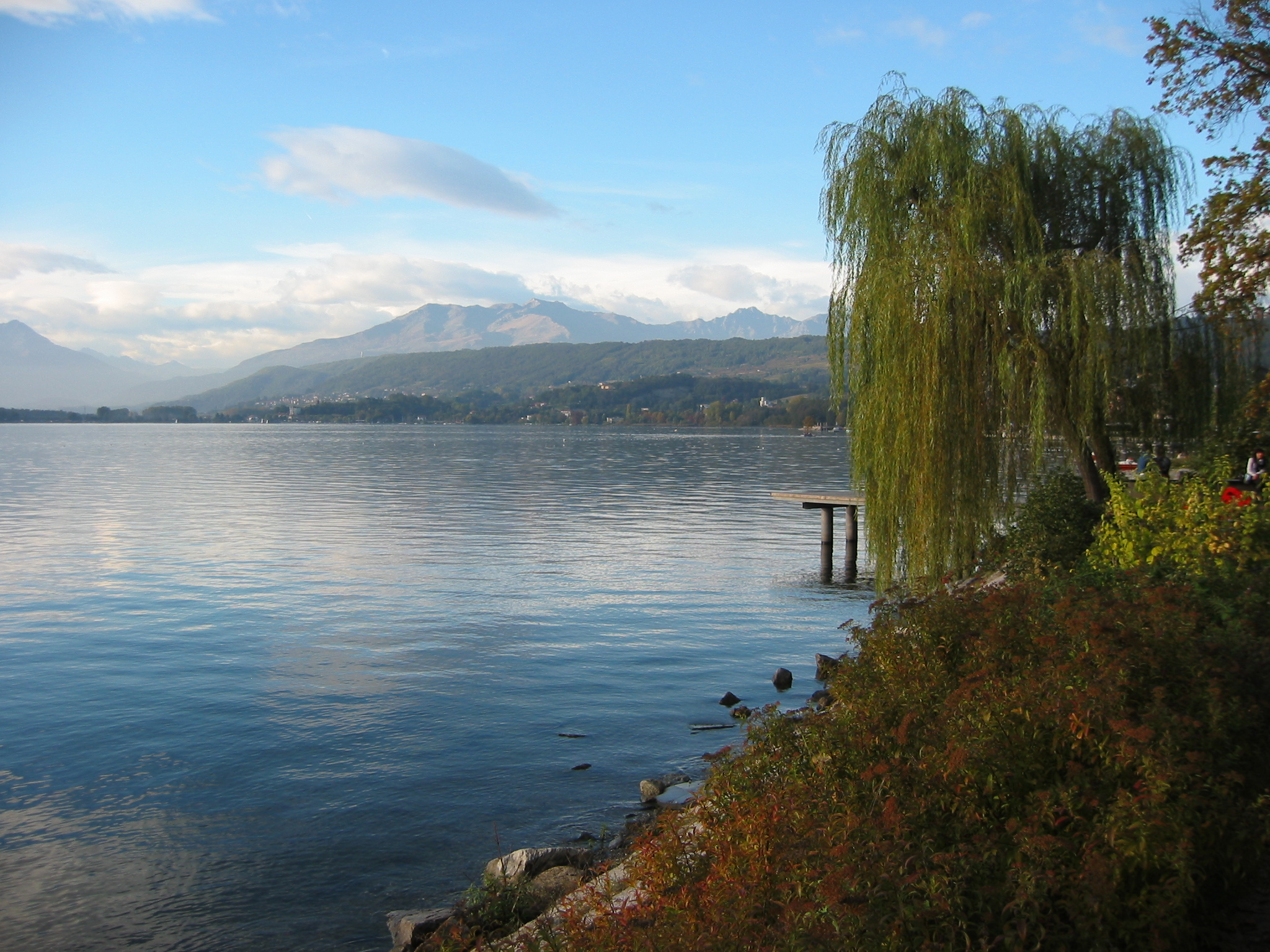

- Location within Piedmont
- Location: Provinces of Biella, Turin and Vercelli; Piedmont
- Coordinates: 45°25′N 8°02′E
- Primary inflows: underwater springs
- Catchment area: 25.7 km^{2} (9.9 sq mi)
- Basin countries: Italy
- Max. length: 3.5 km (2.2 mi)
- Max. width: 2.6 km (1.6 mi)
- Surface area: 5.8 km^{2} (2.2 sq mi)
- Max. depth: 50 m (160 ft)
- Shore length^{1}: 13.1 km (8.1 mi)
- Surface elevation: 230 m (750 ft)
- Settlements: Viverone, Lido, Masseria, Comuna, Anzasco
- ^{1} Shore length is not a well-defined measure.

Named after the town of Viverone, it lies at 230 m AMSL between the districts of Biella, Vercelli and Ivrea in the area of morainic hills known as Serra d'Ivrea. It has an area of about 6 km^{2} and a maximum depth of 50 m, and a perimeter of about 13.1 km. The lake is 3,470 m long and 2,550 m wide. The southern and western parts of the lake are rich in vegetation while the north part is built-up and includes hotels, camping sites and beaches.

Ducks, mallard, coots, grebes and gulls form the major part of the fauna; angling is a popular activity with catches including common whitefish, perch, tench, pike and catfish.

Viverone is a centre for day trips and the lakeside communities of Lido, Masseria, Comuna and Anzasco have recently been connected by a boat service.

The lake is also an important archaeological site: villages made up of stilt houses were present here in the Bronze Age (1300–900 BCE).

== See also ==
- Lake Bertignano
