= Strona di Mosso Valley =

Valley in Piedmont, Italy

- Valle Strona di Mosso or Valle di Mosso
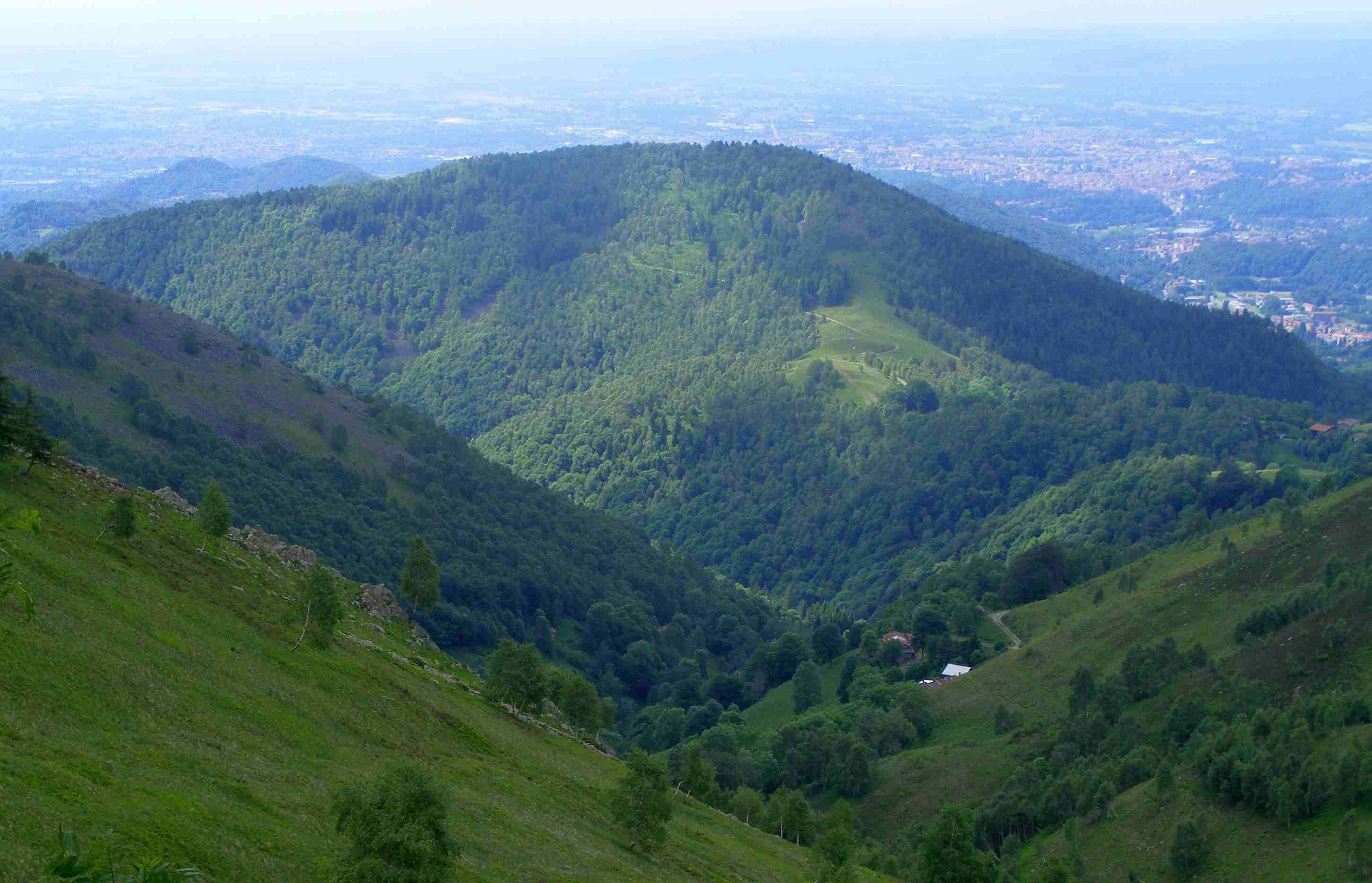
- The highest part of the valley

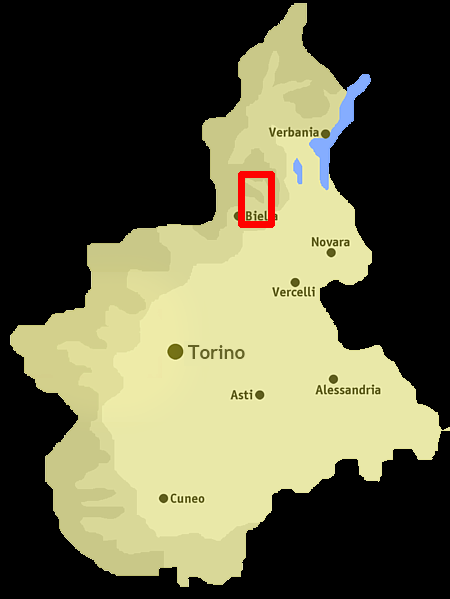
- Location of the valley in Piedmont, northern Italy
- Floor elevation: 250–1,626 m (820–5,335 ft)
- Length: around 20 km (12 mi) NW SE

Geology
- Type: River valley

Geography
- Location: Piedmont, Italy
- Coordinates: 45°22′N 8°54′E

Strona di Mosso Valley (in Italian Valle Strona di Mosso or, simply, Valle di Mosso) is a valley in north-east of Piedmont in the Province of Biella, Italy.

== Etymology ==
The valley takes its name from Strona di Mosso, a right-hand tributary of the Cervo which flows through the valley. In the names of some of the towns and villages of the valley the term Mosso is also included, like i.e. Mosso Santa Maria, Valle Mosso or Crocemosso.

== Geography ==
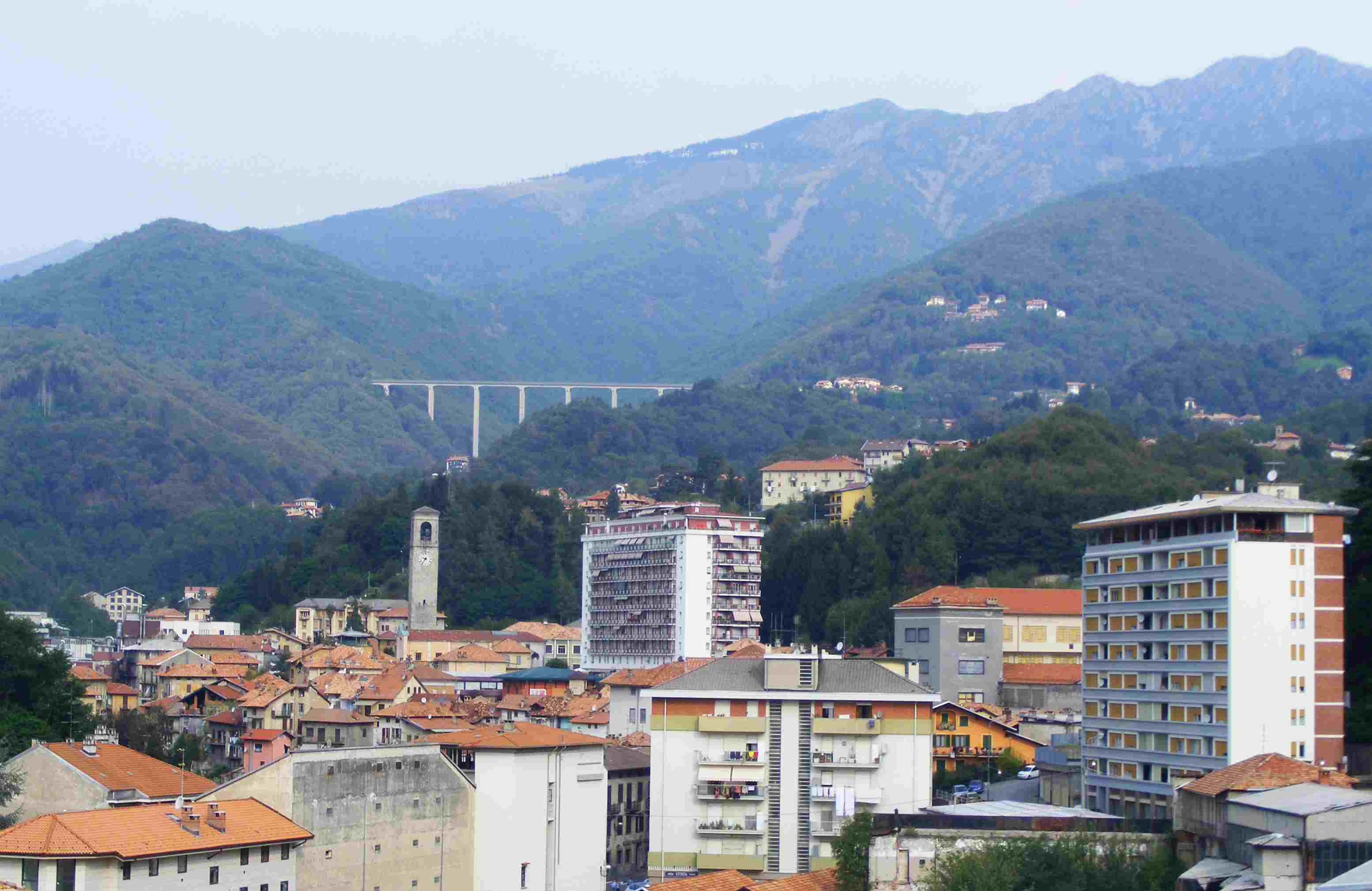
The intermediate part of the valley, densely populated

The valley starts from the mountains where it meets with Cervo Valley and Sessera Valley; going southwards it encompasses a wide, hilly area and ends near Cossato a little before the confluence of the Strona in the Cervo.

Besides Mosso and Valle Mosso, other municipalities of the area are Cossato (a town which lies in the main valley near its exit on the Po plain) and Bioglio, Callabiana, Camandona, Crosa, Lessona, Piatto, Pettinengo, Quaregna, Ronco Biellese, Selve Marcone, Soprana, Strona, Ternengo, Trivero, Vallanzengo, Valle San Nicolao, Veglio, and Zumaglia.

== Notable summits ==
Among the summits which surround the valley (all belonging to the Biellese Alps) there are:

- Monticchio (1.697 m);
- Monte Marca (1.616 m);
- Rocca d'Argimonia (1.610 m);
- Monte Rubello (1.414 m);
- Monte Casto (1.138 m);
- Monte Rovella (889 m).

== See also ==
- Biellese Alps
