= Mosso =

Mosso can refer to:

== People ==
- Angelo Mosso (1846–1910), Italian physiologist
- Basílio Mosso Ramos, Cape Verdean politician
- Eugenio Mosso, Italian footballer
- Melek Mosso, Turkish musician and music teacher

== Places ==
Denmark

- Mossø lake in the nature conservation reserve of Klostermølle

Italy

- Mosso, Piedmont, a former comune in the Province of Biella
- Valle Mosso, a former comune in the Province of Biella
- Strona di Mosso, a creek in Piedmont, Italy
- Strona di Mosso Valley, an alpine valley

== Other uses ==
- Mosso (Rackspace Cloud), web application hosting service.
- See Tempo for the musical term.
