= Ajmone-Marsan =

Ajmone-Marsan is a surname, and can refer to:

- Members of the Ajmone-Marsan family of Italy, including:
  - Marco Ajmone-Marsan (1859–1918), Italian entrepreneur
    - Alessandro Ajmone-Marsan (1884–1941), Italian footballer, elder son of Marco
    - Noemi Ajmone-Marsan (1886–1967), only daughter of Marco
    - Annibale Ajmone-Marsan (1888–1956), Italian footballer, 2nd son of Marco
      - Veniero Ajmone-Marsan (1918–2007), Italian economist, son of Annibale
    - Riccardo Ajmone-Marsan (1889–1958), Italian footballer, 3rd son of Marco
      - Giorgio Ajmone-Marsan (1926–2009), Italian entrepreneur and owner of Magazzini Generali Piemontesi, son of Riccardo
        - Giulia Ajmone-Marsan (1955), Italian journalist and historian, only daughter of Giorgio and daughter of Umberta Nasi
