= Valdilana =

- Comune
- Comune di Valdilana
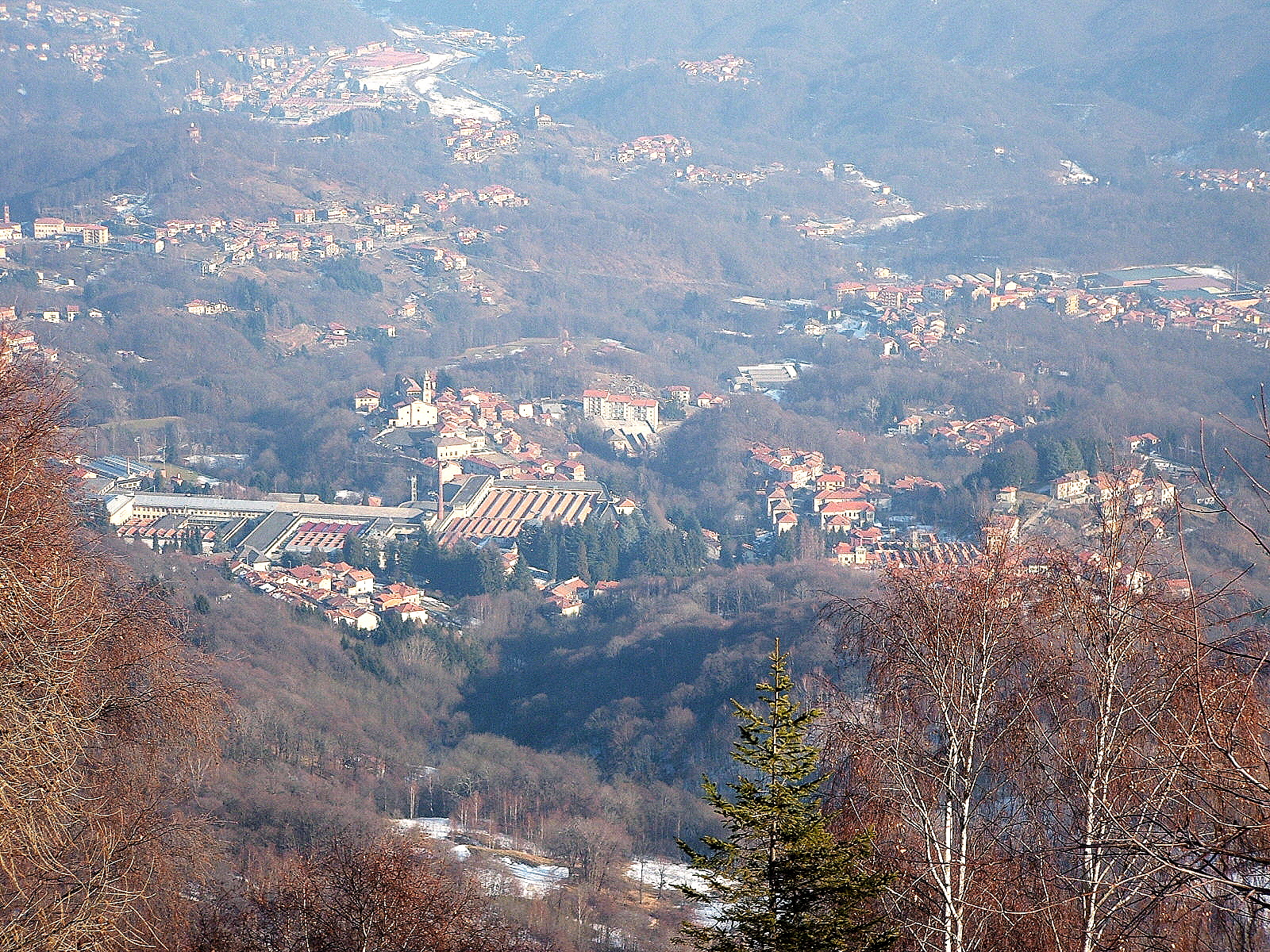
- Panorama

- Flag Coat of arms

- Location within Italy Location within Piedmont
- Coordinates: 45°39′26″N 8°09′02″E
- Country: Italy
- Region: Piedmont
- Province: Province of Biella (BI)
- Frazioni: Bulliana, Cereje, Crocemosso, Mosso, Soprana, Pratrivero, Valle Mosso

Area
  - Total: 61.14 km^{2} (23.61 sq mi)
- Elevation: 434 m (1,424 ft)

Population (2025-11-30)
  - Total: 9,877
  - Density: 161.5/km^{2} (418.4/sq mi)
- Time zone: UTC+1 (CET)
  - Summer (DST): UTC+2 (CEST)
- Postal code: 13835
- Dialing code: 015
- ISTAT code: 096088
- Website: http://www.comune.valdilana.bi.it/

Valdilana is a comune (municipality) in the Province of Biella in the Italian region Piedmont.

== Geography ==
Valdilana is located about 80 kilometres (50 mi) northeast of Turin and about 14 kilometres (9 mi) northeast of Biella. It borders the following municipalities: Bioglio, Camandona, Campiglia Cervo, Caprile, Crevacuore, Curino, Mezzana Mortigliengo, Pettinengo, Piatto, Piedicavallo, Portula, Pray, Scopello (VC), Strona, Vallanzengo, Valle San Nicolao, Veglio.

== History ==
The comune of Valdilana was born on 1 January 2019 due to the fusion of four pre-existent comunes: Mosso, Valle Mosso, Soprana and Trivero.
