= Quaregna Cerreto =

- Comune
- Comune di Quaregna Cerreto
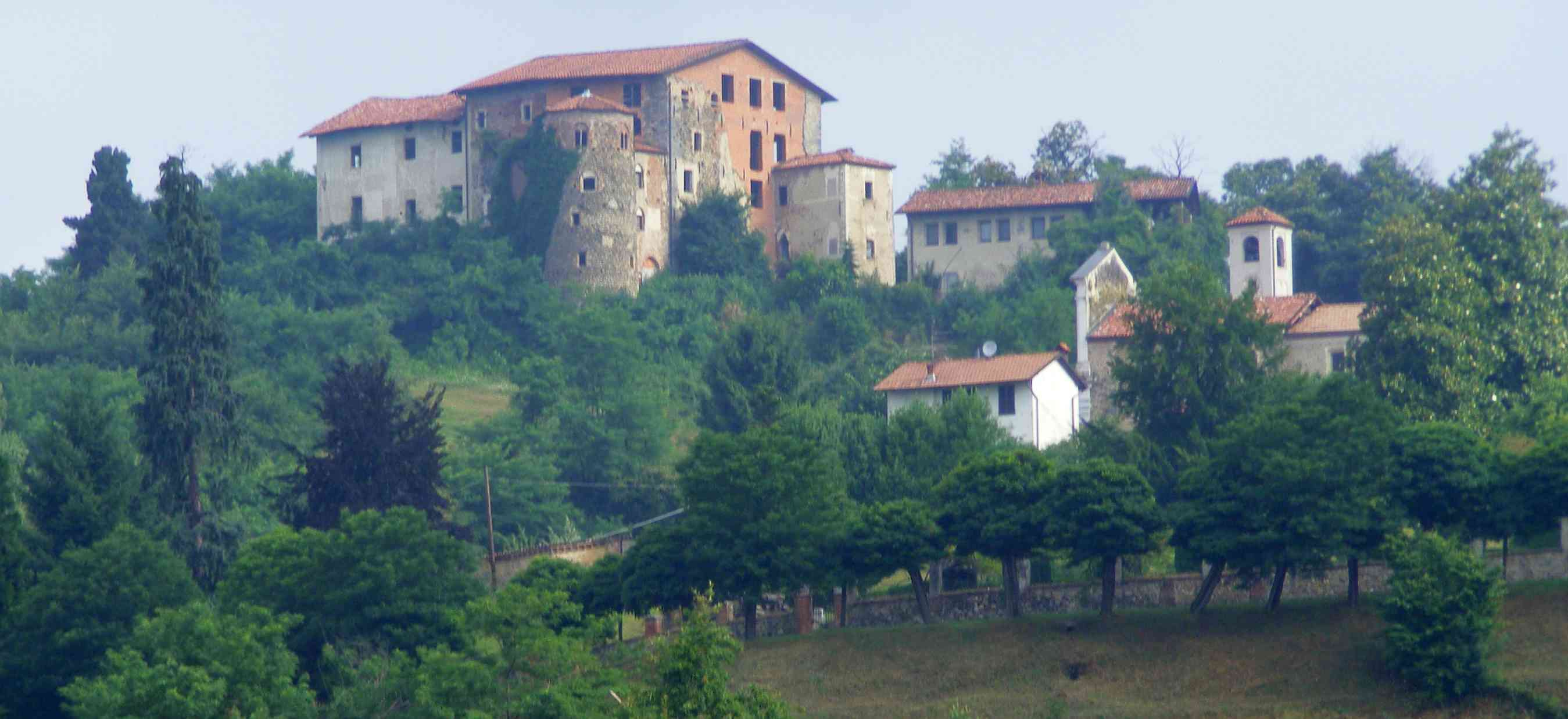
- View of Quaregna Cerreto

- Location within Italy Location within Piedmont
- Coordinates: 45°36′N 8°3′E
- Country: Italy
- Region: Piedmont
- Province: Province of Biella (BI)

Area
  - Total: 8.41 km^{2} (3.25 sq mi)

Population (Nov. 2025)
  - Total: 2,038
  - Density: 242/km^{2} (628/sq mi)
- Time zone: UTC+1 (CET)
  - Summer (DST): UTC+2 (CEST)
- Postal code: 13854
- Dialing code: 015
- ISTAT code: 096987

Quaregna Cerreto is a comune (municipality) in the Province of Biella in the Italian region Piedmont,

== Geography ==
Quaregna Cerreto is located at about 70 kilometres (43 mi) northeast of Turin and about 4 kilometres (2 mi) northwest of Biella. The comune borders the following municipalities: Cossato, Piatto, Valdengo, Vallanzengo, Valle San Nicolao, Vigliano Biellese.

== History ==
The comune of Quaregna Cerreto was born on 1 January 2019 due to the fusion of two pre-existent comunes, Quaregna and Cerreto Castello.
