= Federico Garlanda =

Federico Garlanda (17 April 1837 – 23 March 1913) was an Italian philologist, author, and politician.

== Biography ==
He was born in the hamlet of Strona near Biella, in what was then the Kingdom of Sardinia, and died in Rome. He began his studies in Biella, but moved to the University of Turin where he graduated in 1881 with a degree in letters and philology. In 1882, influenced by his mentor at the university, Giovanni Flechia, he published his first work, Lunghezza di Posizione nel latino, nel greco e nel sanscrito. He then had a period of travels through Great Britain and United States. In London, he published The Philosophy of Words and The Fortunes of Words. From New York in 1887, he published the book Greater America, Hits and Hints by a Foreign Resident; he would later release it in Rome in 1891 as La Nueva Democrazia Americana. Studi e Applicazioni. It was lauded by some as a worthy follow up of Tocqueville's classic.

Returning to Italy, he gained a professorship in English Philology at the University of Rome, teaching courses in Shakespearean literature. He would publish in 1900, Guglielmo Shakespeare: il poeta e l'uomo. In 1890, he published a journal titled Minerva, Rivista delle riviste.

In 1895, he was elected by Cossato as a representative in Parliament. He aligned himself with Francesco Crispi. He was a member of the Directing Council of the Dante Alighieri Society. With his brother, he helped found the Societa editrice Laziale. Due to his interest in Shakespearean studies, he was awarded membership in the Malone Society of London. He was made a knight of the Order of the Crown of Italy, and subsequently awarded the Cross of the Order of Saints Maurice and Lazarus.
