= Strona di Mosso =

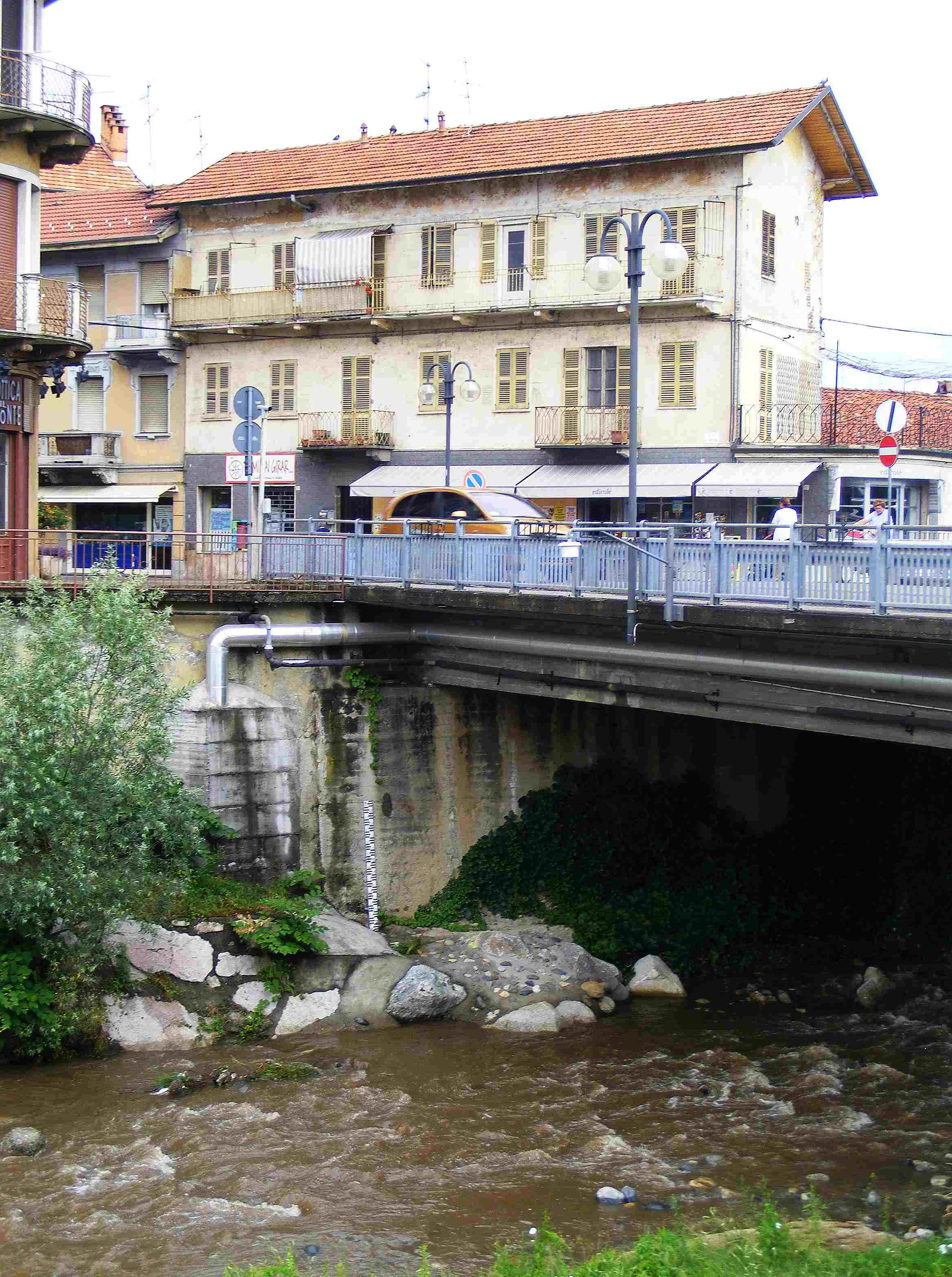
- The Strona di Mosso in Cossato

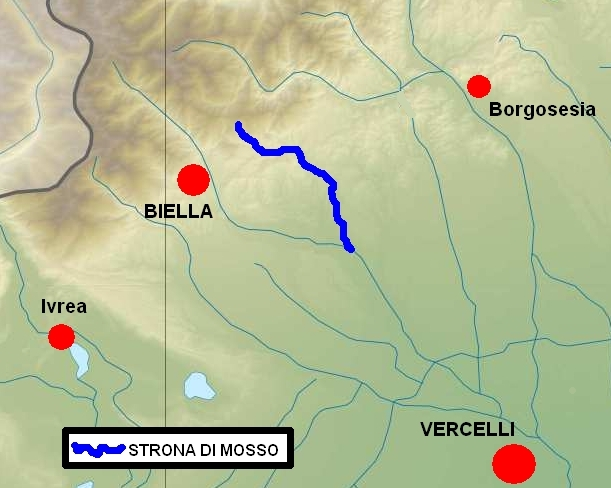
- Location within central Piedmont (NW Italy)

Location
- Country: Italy: province of Biella

Physical characteristics
- Source
  - location: Bocchetto di Sessera southern slopes
  - elevation: around 1,300 m (4,300 ft)
- Mouth
  - location: Cervo
  - coordinates: 45°32′18″N 8°12′32″E
  - elevation: 207.0 m (679.1 ft)
- Length: 23 km (14 mi)
- Basin size: 102 km^{2} (39 mi^{2})
- Discharge
  - average: (mouth) 2.1 m^{3}/s (74 cu ft/s)

Basin features
- Progression: Cervo→ Sesia→ Po→ Adriatic Sea
- Tributaries
  - left: rio Berguso, rio Overa, rio Poala
  - right: rio Soccasca, torrente Tamarone, torrente Quargnasca

The Strona di Mosso (Piedmontese: Stron-a ëd Mòss) is a 23-kilometre (14 mi) long creek in the Piedmont region of northwest Italy.

== Etymology ==
The name Strona should come from storn or strom, celtic roots for flowing waters or rivers.

== Geography ==
The river starts in the Biellese Alps near Bocchetto Sessera, a mountain pass connecting its valley with Val Sessera. Flowing initially from northwest to southeast it reaches Valle Mosso, where it encircles Monte Rovella and turns southwards. In Cossato it gets out of the Alps and enters the Po plain. After receiving from the right its main tributary, the Quargnasca, it flows into the river Cervo.

== Floods ==
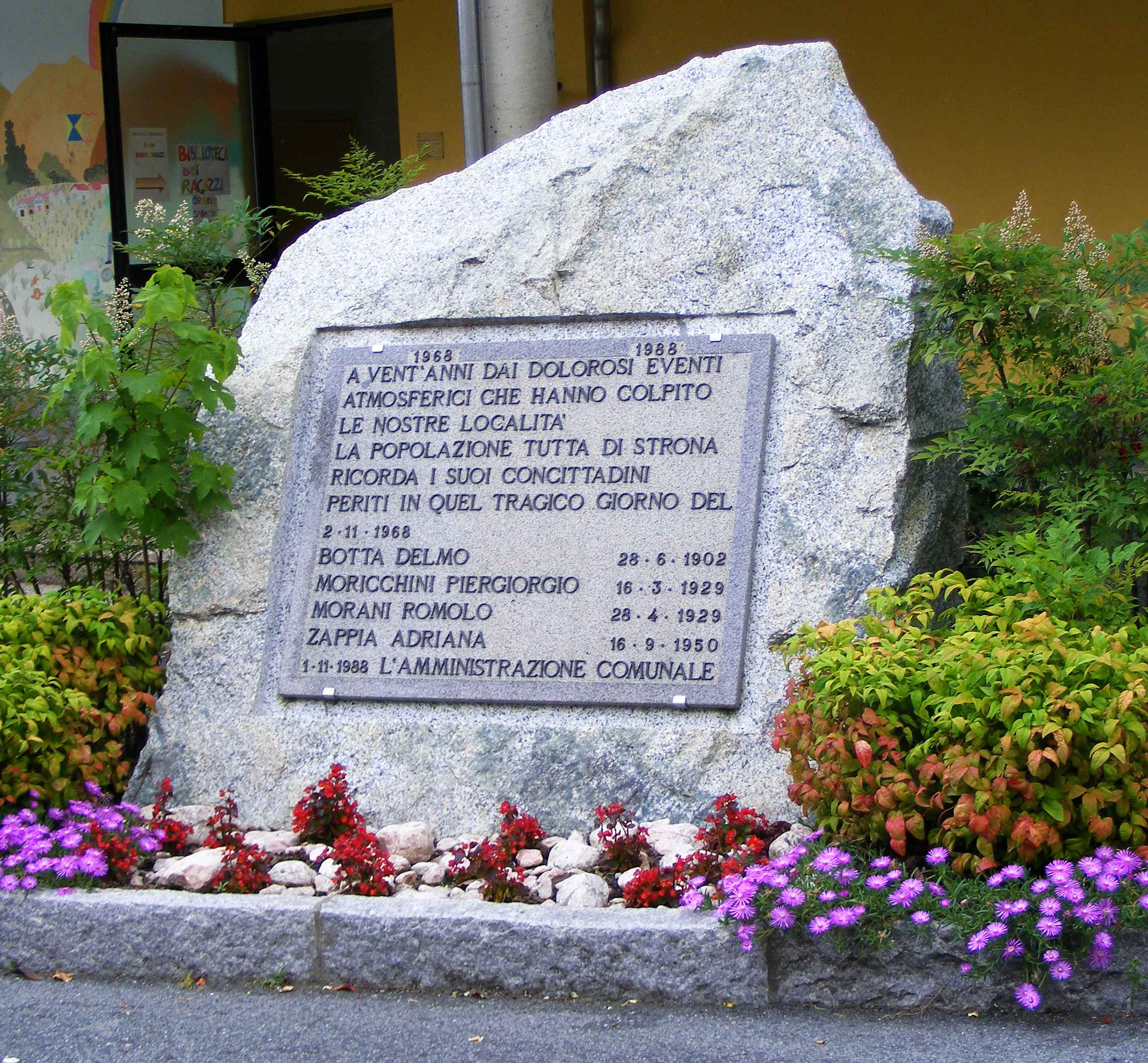
Memorial tablet to the 1968 flood victims in Strona

The river caused severe destruction and 58 casualties in 1968 along the Strona Valley.

== See also ==
- Valle Strona di Mosso
- Alpi Biellesi
- Media related to Strona di Mosso at Wikimedia Commons
