= Cerreto Castello =

- Frazione
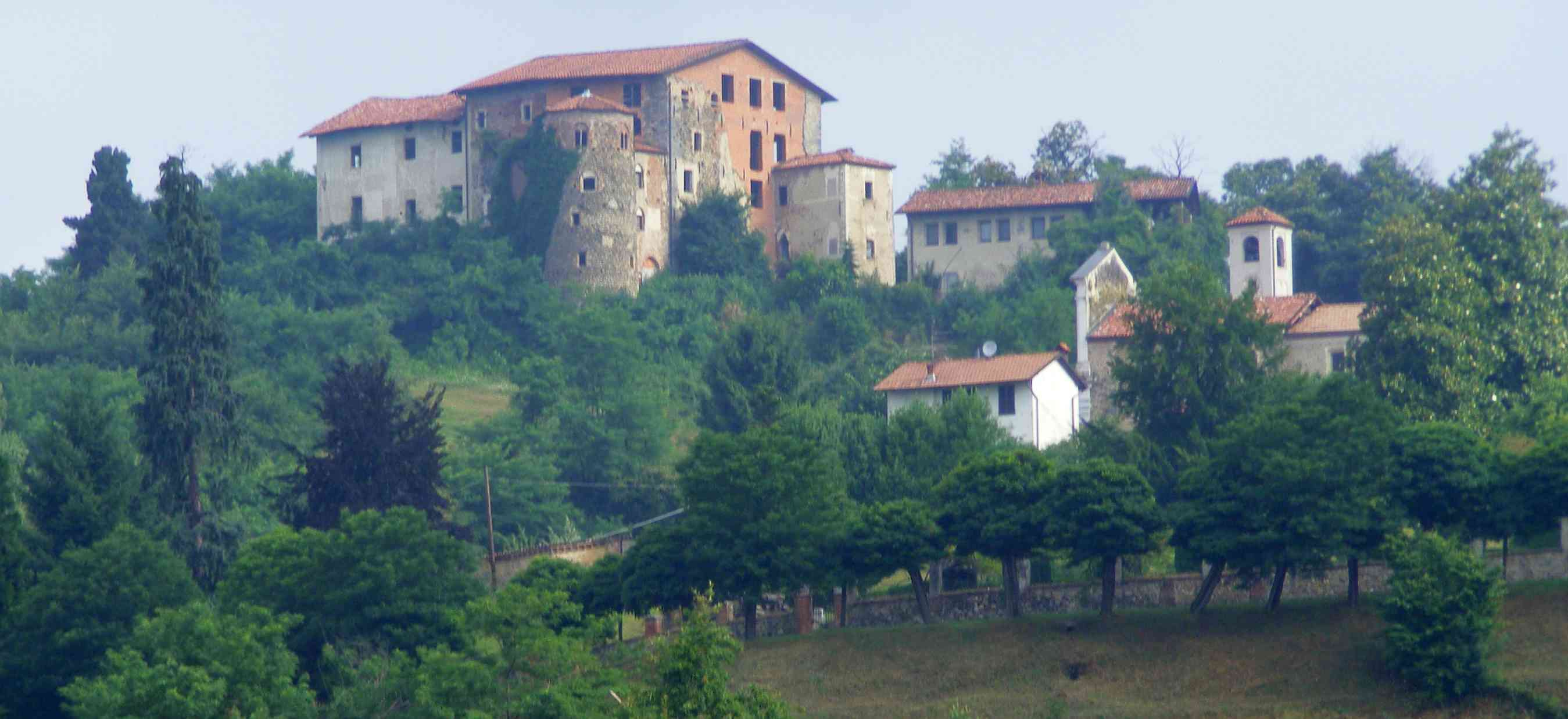
- View of Cerreto Castello

- Location of Cerreto Castello in Italy
- Coordinates: 45°34′N 8°10′E
- Country: Italy
- Region: Piedmont
- Province: Province of Biella (BI)
- Comune: Quaregna Cerreto

Area
  - Total: 2.7 km^{2} (1.0 sq mi)

Population (Dec. 2004)
  - Total: 662
  - Density: 250/km^{2} (640/sq mi)
- Time zone: UTC+1 (CET)
  - Summer (DST): UTC+2 (CEST)
- Postal code: 13060
- Dialing code: 015

Cerreto Castello was a comune (municipality) in the Province of Biella in the Italian region Piedmont, located about 70 km (43 mi) northeast of Turin and about 8 km (5 mi) east of Biella. As of 31 December 2004, it had a population of 662 and an area of 2.7 km^{2} (1 sq mi).

As a comune Cerreto Castello bordered the following municipalities: Cossato, Quaregna, Valdengo, Vigliano Biellese.

== History ==
From 1 January 2019 Cerrato Castello was absorbed by the new-born municipality of Quaregna Cerreto.

== Demographic evolution ==
Historical population

| Year | Pop. | ±% |
|---|---|---|
| 1861 | 244 | — |
| 1871 | 249 | +2.0% |
| 1881 | 264 | +6.0% |
| 1901 | 296 | +12.1% |
| 1911 | 252 | −14.9% |

| Year | Pop. | ±% |
|---|---|---|
| 1921 | 237 | −6.0% |
| 1931 | 225 | −5.1% |
| 1936 | 236 | +4.9% |
| 1951 | 252 | +6.8% |
| 1961 | 340 | +34.9% |

| Year | Pop. | ±% |
|---|---|---|
| 1971 | 368 | +8.2% |
| 1981 | 378 | +2.7% |
| 1991 | 568 | +50.3% |
| 2001 | 668 | +17.6% |

Source: Data from ISTAT
