= Annibale Ajmone-Marsan =

Italian footballer, sports manager, and entrepreneur (1888–1956)

Personal information
- Full name: Annibale Ajmone-Marsan
- Date of birth: 29 February 1888
- Place of birth: Turin, Italy
- Date of death: 5 March 1956 (aged 68)
- Place of death: London
- Position: Midfielder

Youth career
- 1905–1906: Juventus

Senior career*
Years	Team	Apps	(Gls)
1905–1906	Juventus	0	(0)
1909–1910	Juventus	1	(?)
1910–1911	Juventus	0	(0)
Total		1	(?)
- * Club domestic league appearances and goals

Annibale Ajmone-Marsan (Turin, 29 February 1888 – London, 5 March 1956) was an Italian entrepreneur, sports manager and football player, with a midfielder role. He was the brother of Riccardo (III) and Alessandro (I), son of a financier of the club, the entrepreneur Marco Ajmone-Marsan, who was originally from Crosa. His surname in the match tables is sometimes reported as Aimone or Aymone. He was manager of Juventus and attorney general of the entrepreneur Riccardo Gualino.

Annibale married Malvina Terzano, by whom he had two children: Rodi and Vaniero (1918-2007).
