= Casapinta =

- Comune
- Comune di Casapinta
- Coat of arms

- Location within Italy Location within Piedmont
- Coordinates: 45°35′N 8°13′E
- Country: Italy
- Region: Piedmont
- Province: Province of Biella (BI)
- Frazioni: Benzio, Bosco, Brovetto, Campalvero, Fantone, Gallo, Guardia, Rondo, Scalabrino

Area
  - Total: 2.9 km^{2} (1.1 sq mi)

Population (Nov. 2025)
  - Total: 367
  - Density: 130/km^{2} (330/sq mi)
- Time zone: UTC+1 (CET)
  - Summer (DST): UTC+2 (CEST)
- Postal code: 13060
- Dialing code: 015
- ISTAT code: 096014

Casapinta is a comune (municipality) in the Province of Biella in the Italian region Piedmont, located about 70 kilometres (43 mi) northeast of Turin and about 12 kilometres (7 mi) northeast of Biella. As of 30 November 2025, it had a population of 367 and an area of 2.9 square kilometres (1.1 mi^{2}).

Casapinta borders the following municipalities: Crosa, Curino, Lessona, Masserano, Mezzana Mortigliengo, Strona.

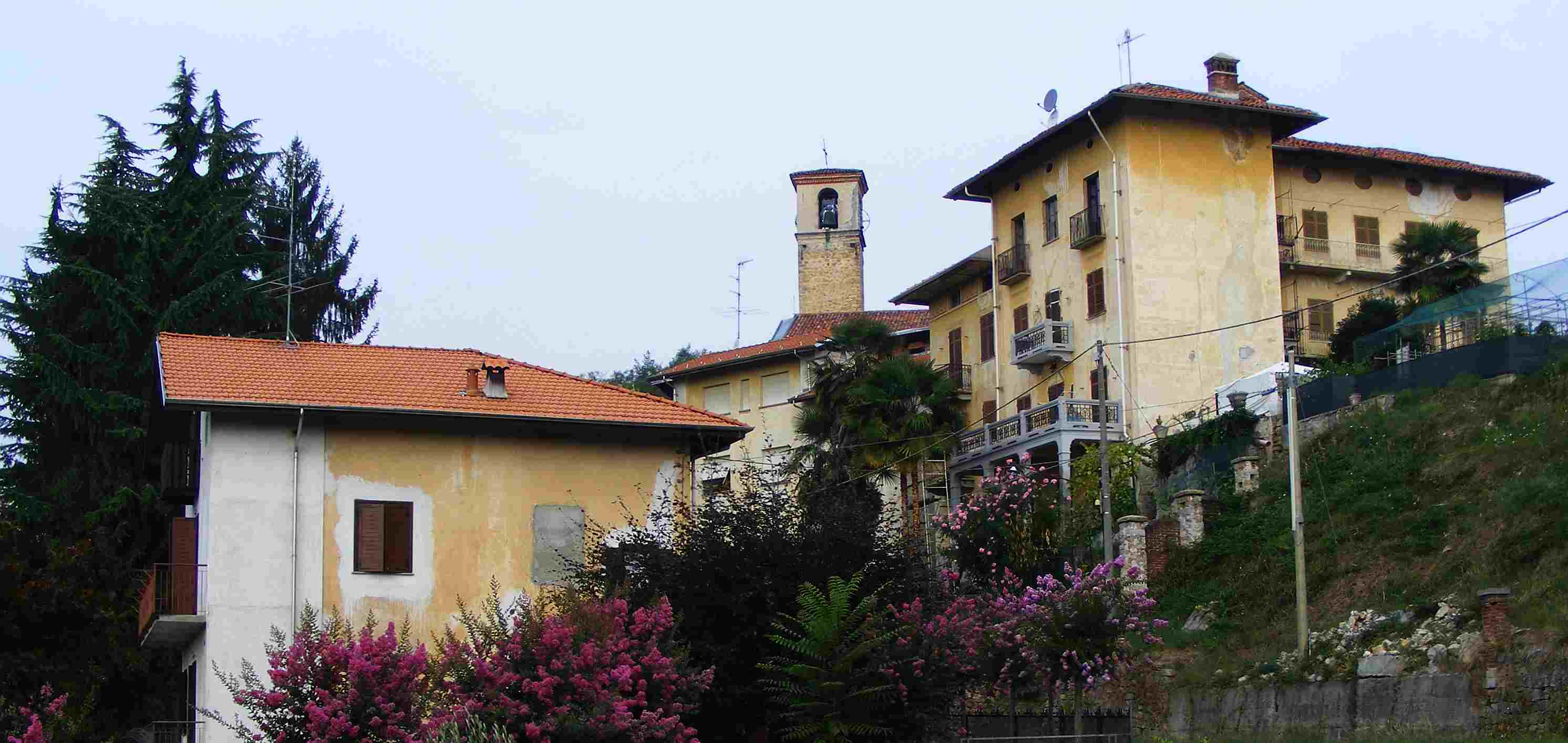
Casapinta

== Demographic evolution ==
Historical population

Year	Pop.	±%
1861	892	—
1871	867	−2.8%
1881	796	−8.2%
1901	862	+8.3%
1911	810	−6.0%
1921	765	−5.6%

Year	Pop.	±%
1931	709	−7.3%
1936	774	+9.2%
1951	855	+10.5%
1961	811	−5.1%
1971	715	−11.8%
1981	547	−23.5%

Year	Pop.	±%
1991	461	−15.7%
2001	449	−2.6%
2011	454	+1.1%
2021	397	−12.6%

Source: Data from ISTAT
