= Sergio Scaramal =

Italian politician (born 1953)

President of the Province of Biella
- In office 28 June 2004 – 8 June 2009
- Preceded by: Orazio Scanzio
- Succeeded by: Roberto Simonetti

Mayor of Cossato
- In office 21 September 1989 – 14 June 2004
- Succeeded by: Ermanno Bianchetto

Personal details
- Born: 21 June 1953 (age 73) Biella, Piedmont, Italy
- Party: Italian Communist Party; Democratic Party of the Left; Democrats of the Left
- Occupation: Public employee

Sergio Scaramal (born 21 June 1953) is an Italian politician who served as president of the Province of Biella from 2004 to 2009 and as mayor of Cossato from 1990 to 2004.

== Life and career ==
Scaramal worked for Telecom Italia before entering local politics and was associated with the labour movement and the Italian Communist Party. He was elected mayor of Cossato in 1989 and served for fifteen years, until 2004.

In the 2004 provincial election, Scaramal was the centre-left candidate for president of the Province of Biella. His coalition included the Democrats of the Left, The Daisy, Communist Refoundation Party and Party of Italian Communists, among other centre-left parties. Scaramal finished second in the first round behind incumbent president Orazio Scanzio and won the runoff by 41 votes. He received 45,984 votes (50.02%), compared with 45,943 votes (49.98%) for Scanzio. He served as president until June 2009, when he was succeeded by Roberto Simonetti.

He later served at the municipal council of Strona from 2013 to 2014, and was councillor and assessor in Zumaglia from 2016 to 2021.
