= Orazio Scanzio =

Italian politician (1947–2020)

President of the Province of Biella
- In office 28 June 1999 – 28 June 2004
- Preceded by: Silvia Marsoni
- Succeeded by: Sergio Scaramal

Personal details
- Born: 29 July 1947 Biella, Province of Vercelli, Italy
- Died: 12 January 2020 (aged 72) Candelo, Piedmont, Italy
- Party: Forza Italia
- Occupation: Geologist

Orazio Scanzio (29 July 1947 – 12 January 2020) was an Italian politician who served as president of the Province of Biella from 1999 to 2004.

== Life and career ==
A geologist and executive, Scanzio served for many years as director of the Association of Building Contractors of Biella.

In the 1999 provincial election in Biella, Scanzio was the centre-right candidate for president supported by the Pole for Freedoms coalition, composed of Forza Italia, National Alliance and the Christian Democratic Centre. He was elected in the second round held on 27 June 1999 with 52.3% of the vote, defeating the incumbent president Silvia Marsoni of The Olive Tree.

Seeking re-election in the 2004 provincial election, he lost the run-off vote with 49.9% against Sergio Scaramal. In 2009 he was elected again to the Biella Provincial Council and served as assessor and vice president in the administration led by Roberto Simonetti.

Scanzio died in Candelo on 12 January 2020 at the age of 72.
