= Trivero =

- Frazione
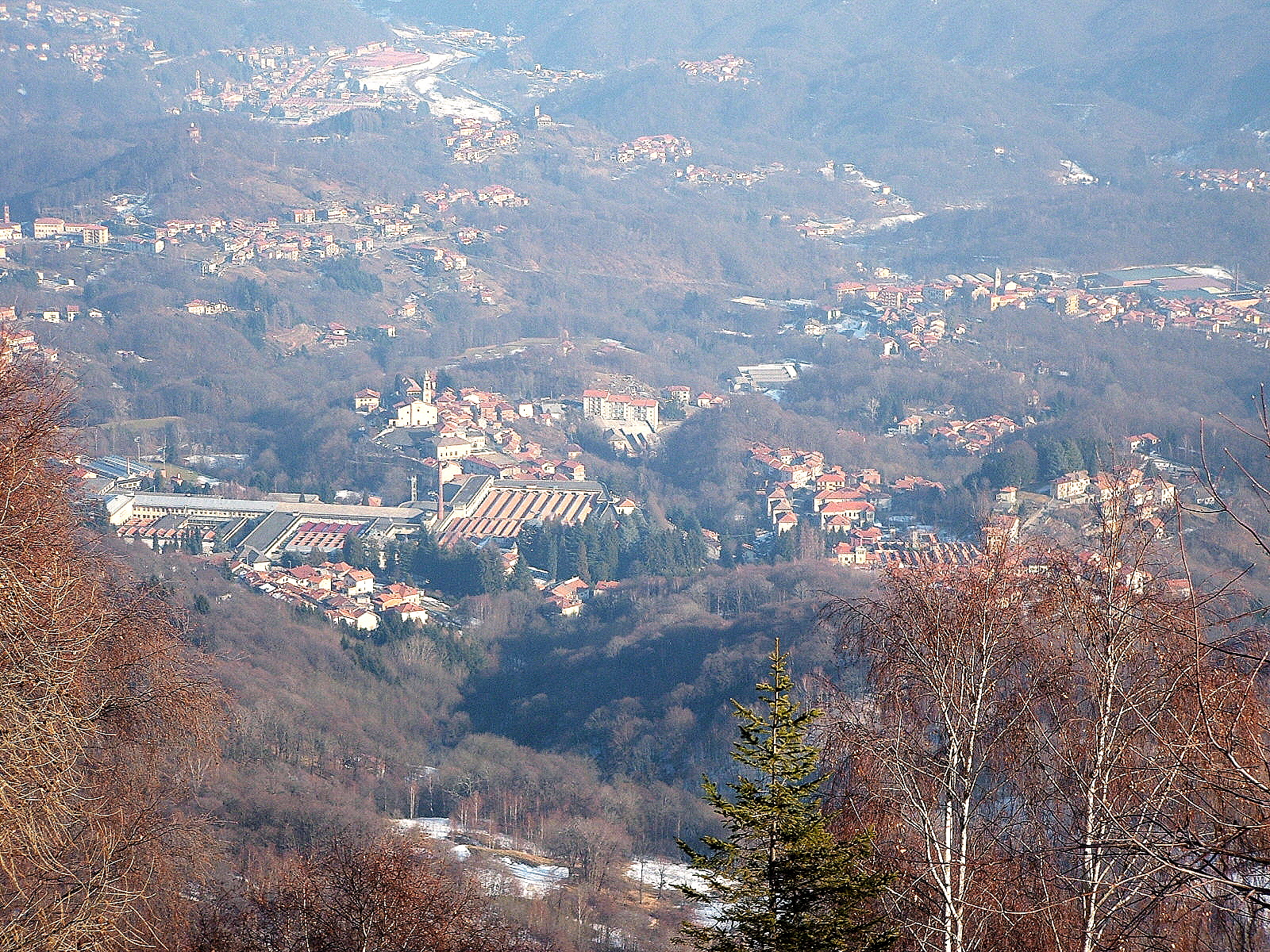

- Location of Trivero in Italy
- Coordinates: 45°40′N 8°10′E
- Country: Italy
- Region: Piedmont
- Province: Biella (BI)
- Comune: Valdilana

Area
  - Total: 29.9 km^{2} (11.5 sq mi)
- Elevation: 739 m (2,425 ft)

Population (Dec. 2004)
  - Total: 6,663
  - Density: 223/km^{2} (577/sq mi)
- Demonym: Triveresi
- Time zone: UTC+1 (CET)
  - Summer (DST): UTC+2 (CEST)
- Postal code: 13835
- Dialing code: 015
- Patron saint: San Quirico

Trivero (Piedmontese: Tarvè) was a comune (municipality) in the Province of Biella in the Italian region Piedmont, located about 80 kilometres (50 mi) northeast of Turin and about 14 kilometres (9 mi) northeast of Biella.

== Physical geography ==
Trivero bordered the following municipalities: Camandona, Caprile, Crevacuore, Curino, Mezzana Mortigliengo, Mosso, Portula, Pray, Scopello, Soprana, Strona, Vallanzengo, Valle Mosso, Valle San Nicolao.

As a comune it had the following frazioni (villages): Pratrivero, Ponzone, Cereje, Polto, Barbero, Sella, Lora, Guala, Ronco, Mazza, Mazzucco, Vaudano, Botto, Pramorisio, Piana, Castello, Fila, Dosso, Grillero, Pellizaro, Vico, Oro, Ferrero, Gioia, Roveglio, Villaggio Residenziale, Bellavista, Caulera, Stavello, Barbato, S. Antonio, Barozzo, Marone Bulliana, Giardino

== History ==
Trivero is an important centre of the wool industry. The Italian fashion companies Ermenegildo Zegna and Loro Piana were born in Trivero.

From 1 January 2019 Trivero was absorbed by the new-born municipality of Valdilana.

== Demographic evolution ==
Historical population

Year	Pop.	±%
1861	4,418	—
1871	4,808	+8.8%
1881	4,923	+2.4%
1901	4,763	−3.3%
1911	4,898	+2.8%

Year	Pop.	±%
1921	5,014	+2.4%
1931	6,897	+37.6%
1936	7,591	+10.1%
1951	8,162	+7.5%
1961	9,066	+11.1%

Year	Pop.	±%
1971	8,719	−3.8%
1981	8,180	−6.2%
1991	7,331	−10.4%
2001	6,883	−6.1%

Source: Data from ISTAT

== See also ==
- Nostra Signora della Brughiera
