= Curino =

- Comune
- Comune di Curino
- Coat of arms

- Location within Italy Location within Piedmont
- Coordinates: 45°35′N 8°13′E
- Country: Italy
- Region: Piedmont
- Province: Province of Biella (BI)

Area
  - Total: 21.4 km^{2} (8.3 sq mi)

Population (Dec. 2004)
  - Total: 480
  - Density: 22/km^{2} (58/sq mi)
- Time zone: UTC+1 (CET)
  - Summer (DST): UTC+2 (CEST)
- Postal code: 13060
- Dialing code: 015

Curino is a comune (municipality) in the Province of Biella in the Italian region Piedmont, located about 70 kilometres (43 mi) northeast of Turin and about 12 kilometres (7 mi) northeast of Biella. As of 31 December 2004, it had a population of 480 and an area of 21.4 square kilometres (8.3 mi^{2}).

Curino borders the following municipalities: Brusnengo, Casapinta, Crevacuore, Masserano, Mezzana Mortigliengo, Pray, Roasio, Soprana, Sostegno, Trivero, Villa del Bosco.

== Population ==
Historical population

Year	Pop.	±%
1861	2,512	—
1871	2,583	+2.8%
1881	2,912	+12.7%
1901	2,516	−13.6%
1911	2,625	+4.3%

Year	Pop.	±%
1921	2,899	+10.4%
1931	1,421	−51.0%
1936	1,229	−13.5%
1951	1,075	−12.5%
1961	901	−16.2%

Year	Pop.	±%
1971	711	−21.1%
1981	582	−18.1%
1991	507	−12.9%
2001	475	−6.3%

Source: Data from ISTAT
