= Castellengo Castle =

Castle in Cossato, Piedmont, Italy

- Castello di Castellengo
- Cossato, Piedmont, Italy
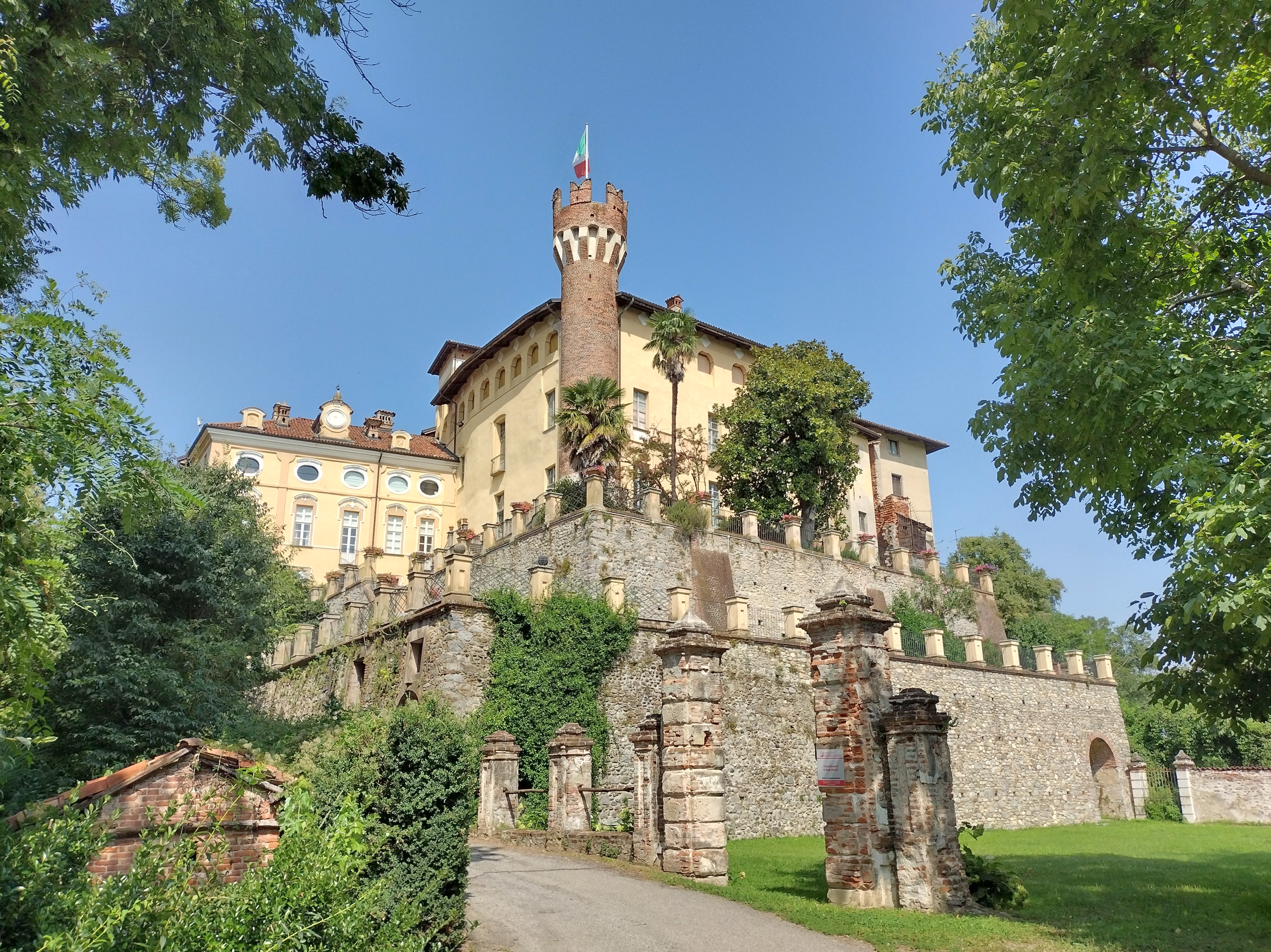
- Castellengo Castle in 2014

Site information
- Type: Castle

Location
- Coordinates: 45°31′53.44″N 8°11′15.69″E

Castellengo Castle (Italian: Castello di Castellengo) is a castle located in Cossato, Piedmont, Italy.

== History ==
Tradition attributes the construction of the castle to Alberico di Monterone in the 10th century, but more detailed studies trace its foundation to an earlier time.

The castle later belonged to the De Bulgaro family, which, from the 12th century, took on the name De Castellengo.

In 1374, the castle was pledged to the House of Savoy; in 1406, it was occupied by the mercenary soldier Bando of Florence, an event that led to the De Castellengo family being accused of treason against the Savoys. To reclaim it, Amadeus VIII, Duke of Savoy laid siege to the castle until February 1409.

== Description ==
The castle stands on one of the first hills at the edge of the Biellese plain, on the right bank of the Cervo river.

== Gallery ==
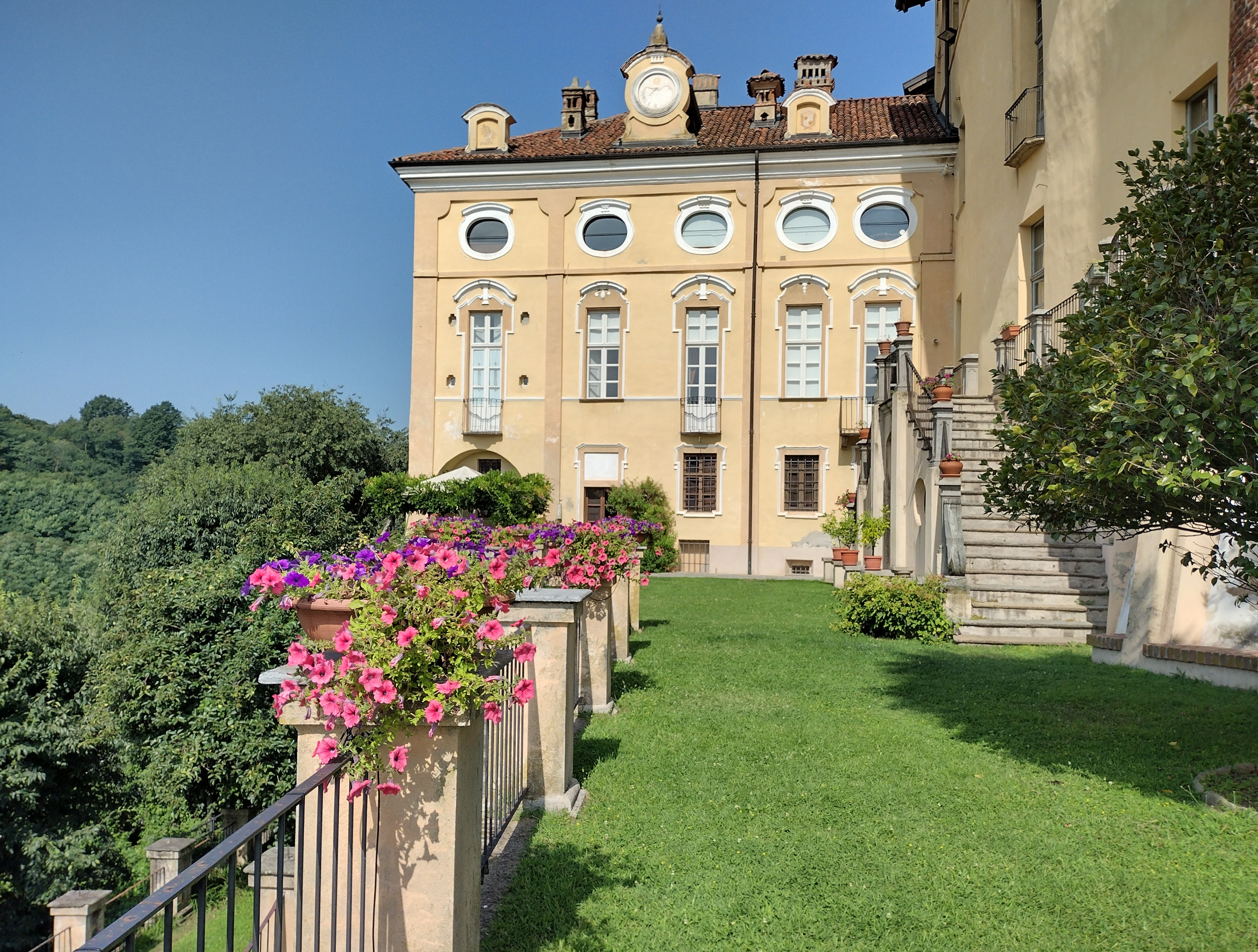

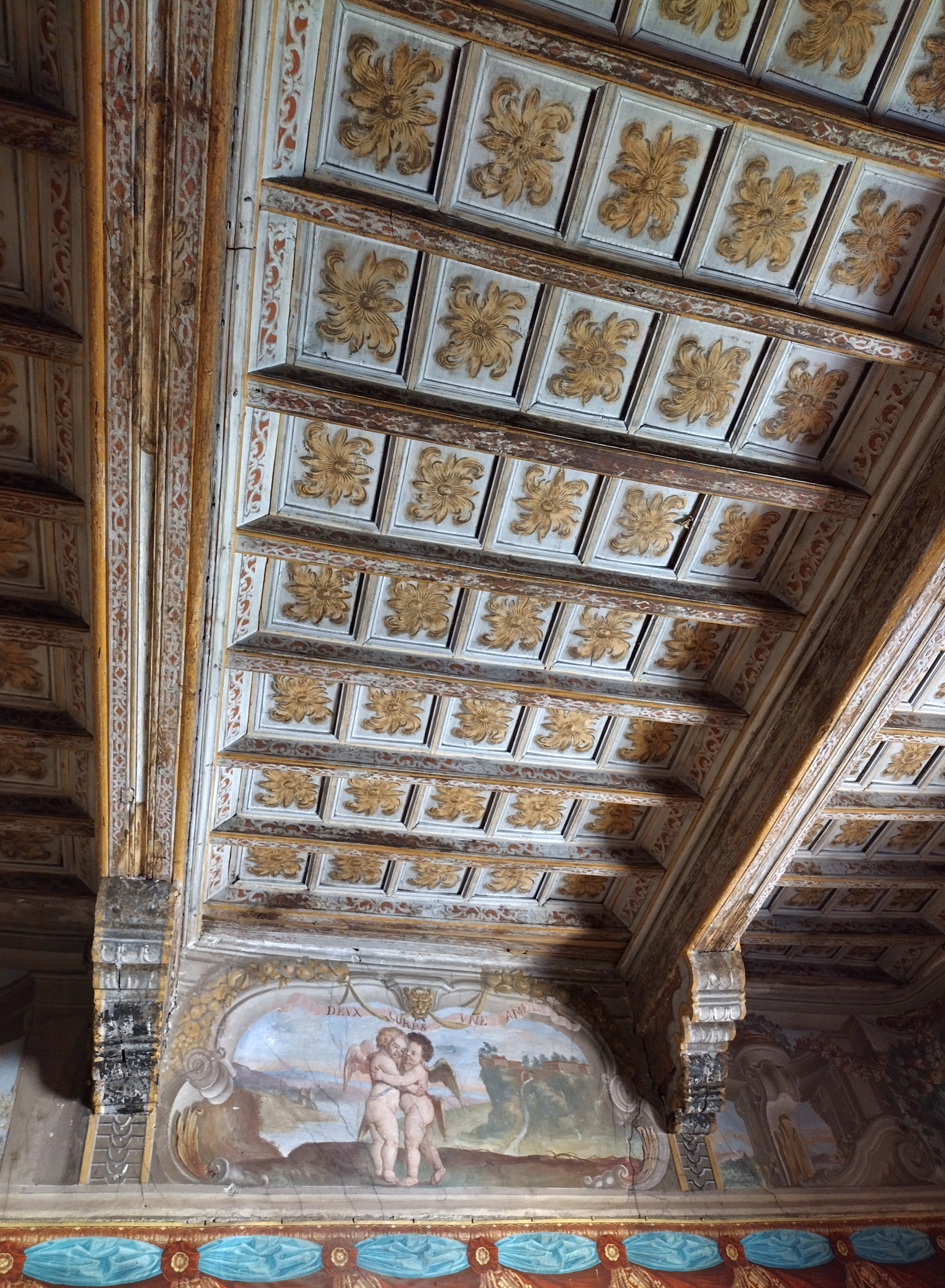

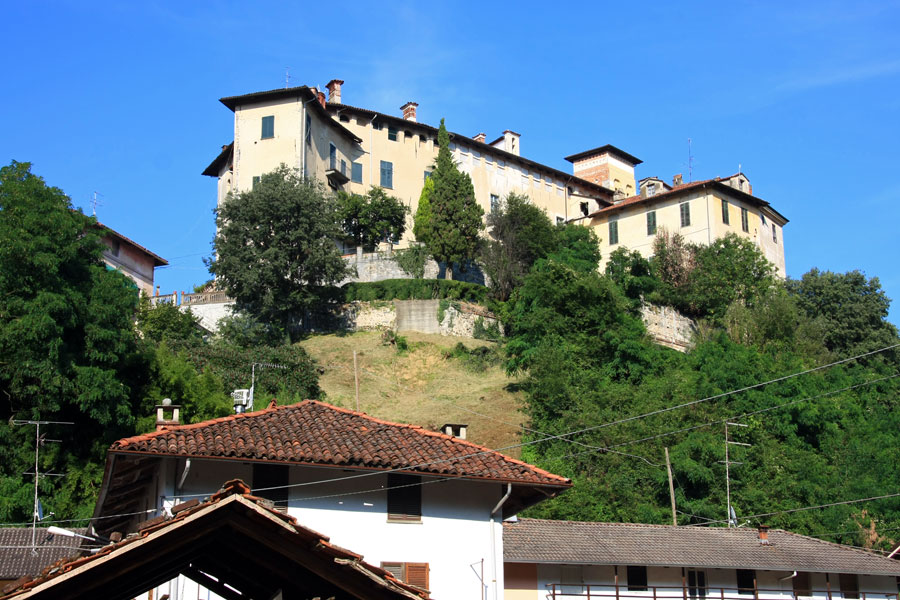
