= Quittengo =

- Frazione
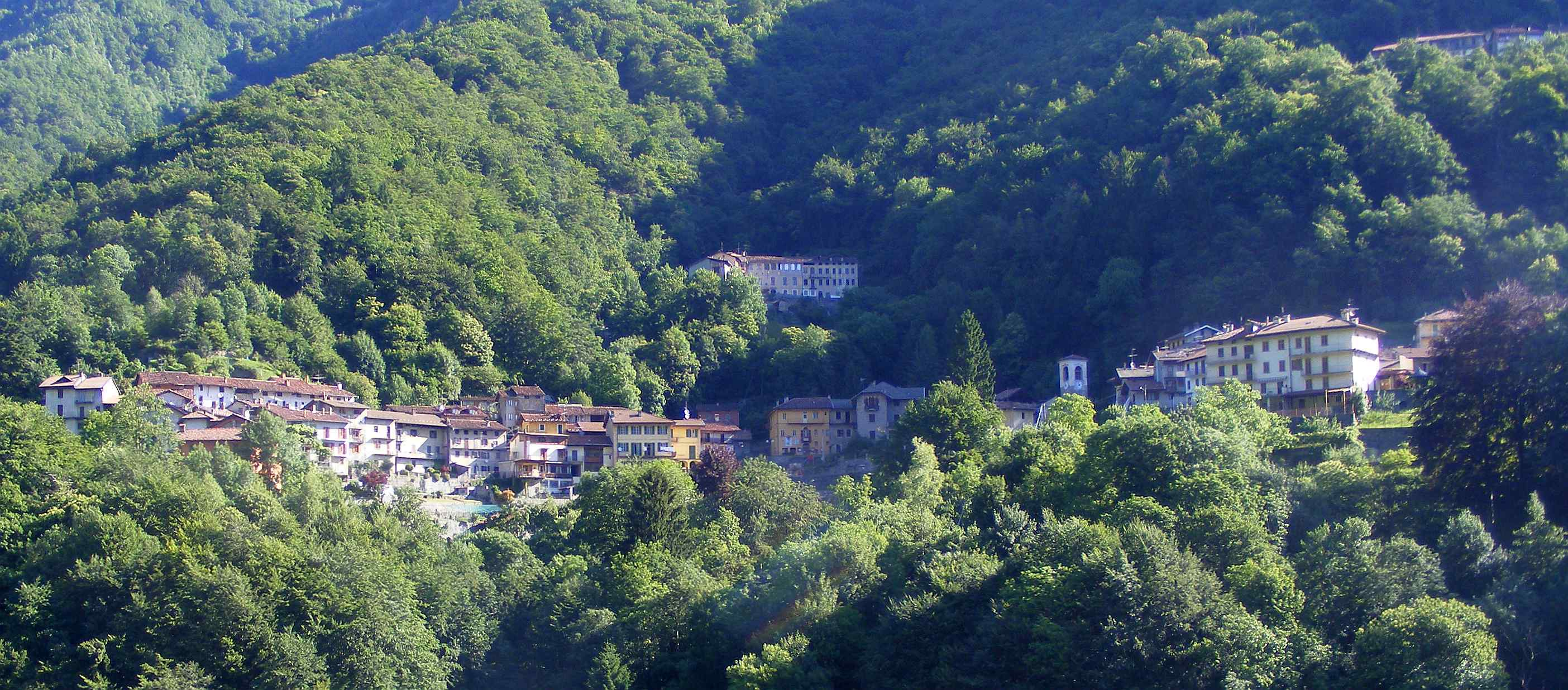

- Location of Quittengo in Italy
- Coordinates: 45°36′N 8°3′E
- Country: Italy
- Region: Piedmont
- Province: Biella (BI)
- Comune: Campiglia Cervo

Area
  - Total: 8.0 km^{2} (3.1 sq mi)

Population (Dec. 2004)
  - Total: 221
  - Density: 28/km^{2} (72/sq mi)
- Time zone: UTC+1 (CET)
  - Summer (DST): UTC+2 (CEST)
- Postal code: 13060
- Dialing code: 015

Quittengo was a comune (municipality) in the Province of Biella in the Italian region Piedmont, located about 70 kilometres (43 mi) northeast of Turin and about 4 kilometres (2 mi) northwest of Biella. From 1 January 2016 Quittengo, along with San Paolo Cervo, was absorbed by the neighbouring municipality of Campiglia Cervo.

As an autonomous commune Quittengo bordered the following municipalities: Campiglia Cervo, Mosso, Sagliano Micca, San Paolo Cervo, Veglio.

== Twin towns ==
Quittengo is twinned with:

- Castelmagno, Italy, since 1975
