= Silvia Marsoni =

Italian oncologist and politician (born 1952)

President of the Province of Biella
- In office 12 May 1995 – 28 June 1999
- Preceded by: Office established
- Succeeded by: Orazio Scanzio

Personal details
- Born: 2 September 1952 (age 74) Treviso, Italy
- Party: Federation of the Greens; Democrats of the Left
- Education: University of Milan
- Profession: Physician

Silvia Marsoni (born 2 September 1952) is an Italian oncologist and politician who served as the first president of the Province of Biella from 1995 to 1999.

== Life and career ==
Born in Treviso in 1952, Marsoni graduated in medicine from the University of Milan in 1977 and specialized in oncology at the National Cancer Institute in Bethesda, Maryland, where she worked until 1984. From 1987 to 1993 she headed the Clinical Trials Unit at the Mario Negri Institute for Pharmacological Research. She later collaborated with the European Institute of Oncology, where she served in a senior role, as well as with the universities of Milan and Ferrara.

At the first provincial elections held in Biella in 1995, Marsoni was the centre-left candidate for president of the Province of Biella, supported by the Federation of the Greens, the Democratic Party of the Left, the Italian People's Party, and the Pact of Democrats. She was elected in the run-off election on 7 May with 55.7% of the vote, defeating centre-right candidate Giovanni Gremmo.

Standing for re-election in the 1999 provincial election as the candidate of the Democrats of the Left, she was defeated in the run-off with 37.9% of the vote by Orazio Scanzio of the Pole for Freedoms.

After retiring from politics in 2004, Marsoni served as director of the SENDO Foundation in Milan until 2011 and of the Piedmont Foundation for Oncology in Candiolo from 2011 to 2017. Since 2018 she has been a research scientist at the IFOM (FIRC Institute of Molecular Oncology).

In December 2023, she was appointed a Knight of the Order of Merit of the Italian Republic.
