= Emanuele Ramella Pralungo =

Italian politician (born 1975)

President of the Province of Biella
- Incumbent
- Assumed office 19 December 2021
- Preceded by: Gianluca Foglia Barbisin
- In office 14 October 2014 – 14 November 2018
- Preceded by: Roberto Simonetti
- Succeeded by: Gianluca Foglia Barbisin

Mayor of Occhieppo Superiore
- Incumbent
- Assumed office 8 June 2009
- Preceded by: Guido Dellarovere

Personal details
- Born: 24 May 1975 (age 51) Biella, Piedmont, Italy
- Party: Democratic Party
- Education: University of Pavia
- Profession: Teacher

Emanuele Ramella Pralungo (born 24 May 1975) is an Italian politician who has served as president of the Province of Biella since 2021. He previously held the office from 2014 to 2018.

== Life and career ==
Ramella Pralungo was born in Biella in 1975 and graduated in law from the University of Pavia in 2004. He later worked as a teacher of administrative and legal subjects.

He began his political career in Occhieppo Superiore, where he was elected councillor in 1995 as a representative of the centre-left coalition. He was re-elected to the municipal council in 1999 and 2004. In June 2009, he was elected mayor and was re-elected in 2014.

In October 2014, Ramella Pralungo was elected president of the Province of Biella in the first provincial election held under the provisions of Law 56/2014. He obtained 51,810 weighted votes (68.23%), defeating centre-right candidate Sergio Fantone, who received 24,127 votes (31.77%). He served until November 2018, when he was elected as a member of the Provincial Council.

Ramella Pralungo was confirmed as mayor of Occhieppo Superiore in 2019 and 2024.

In December 2021, he was elected again as president of the province for a second non-consecutive term. Supported by the Democratic Party and civic lists, he defeated centre-right candidate Francesca Delmastro of Brothers of Italy, obtaining a majority of weighted votes and succeeding Gianluca Foglia Barbisin.

Ramella Pralungo was confirmed for a third term in March 2026, defeating Paolo Gelone, mayor of Candelo, receiving 50,616 weighted votes (57.39%) against Gelone's 37,576 (42.61%).
