= San Paolo Cervo =

- Frazione
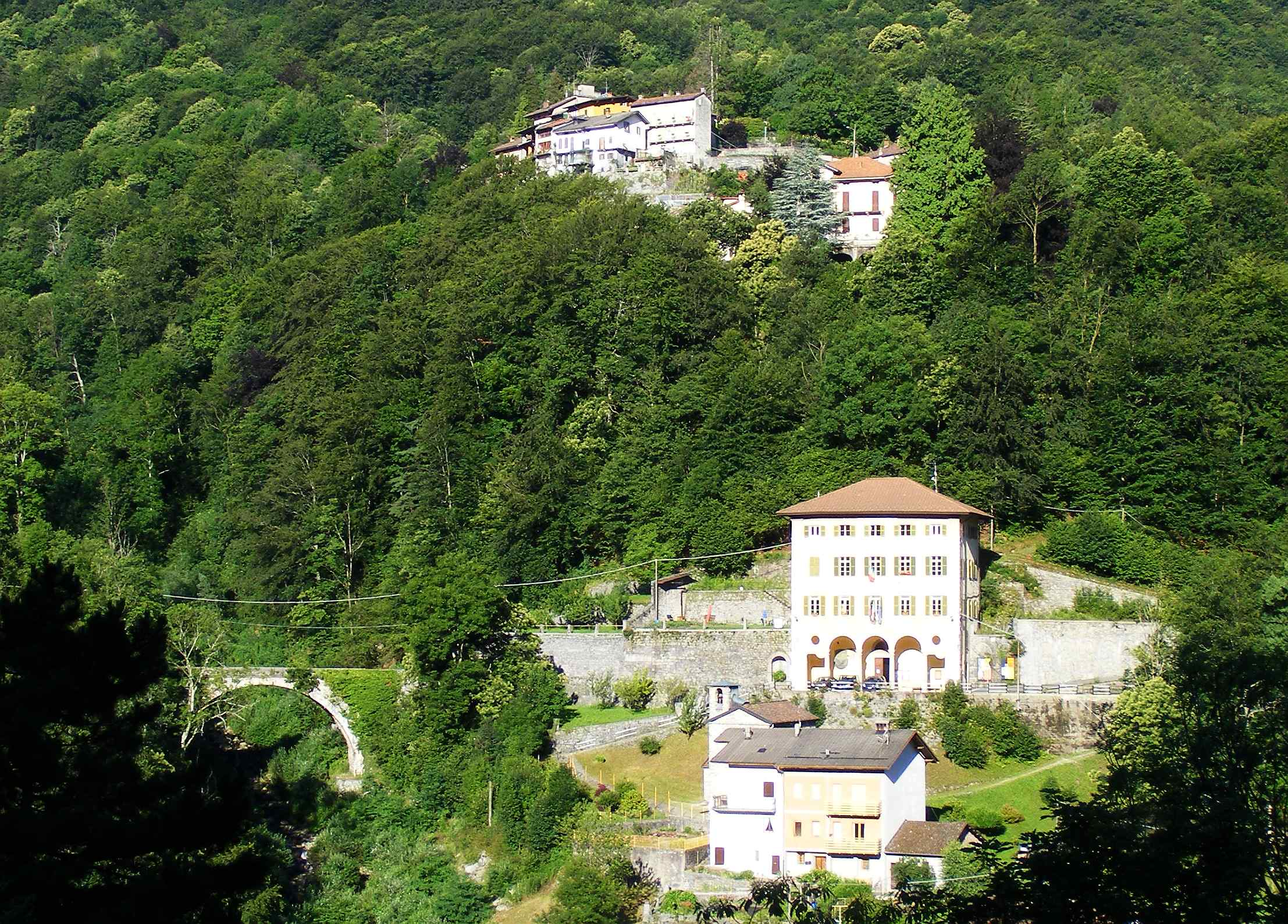

- Location of San Paolo Cervo in Italy
- Coordinates: 45°36′N 8°3′E
- Country: Italy
- Region: Piedmont
- Province: Biella (BI)
- Comune: Campiglia Cervo

Area
  - Total: 8.4 km^{2} (3.2 sq mi)

Population (Dec. 2004)
  - Total: 139
  - Density: 17/km^{2} (43/sq mi)
- Demonym: Sanpaolesi
- Time zone: UTC+1 (CET)
  - Summer (DST): UTC+2 (CEST)
- Postal code: 13812
- Dialing code: 015
- Patron saint: St. Paul the Apostle
- Saint day: 29 June

San Paolo Cervo is a former comune (municipality) in the Province of Biella in the Italian region Piedmont, located about 70 kilometres (43 mi) northeast of Turin and about 4 kilometres (2 mi) northwest of Biella. From 1 January 2016 San Paolo Cervo, along with Quittengo, was absorbed by the neighbouring municipality of Campiglia Cervo.
