= List of presidents of the Province of Biella =

President of the Province of Biella
- Presidente della Provincia di Biella
- Incumbent; Emanuele Ramella Pralungo since 19 December 2021
- Term length: 4 years
- Inaugural holder: Silvia Marsoni
- Formation: 1995

The president of the Province of Biella is the head of the provincial government in Biella, Piedmont, Italy. The president oversees the administration of the province, coordinates the activities of the municipalities, and represents the province in regional and national matters.

Since December 2021, the office has been held by Emanuele Ramella Pralungo of the Democratic Party.

== History ==
The Province of Biella was established in 1992, after being separated from the Province of Vercelli. In its initial phase, the new province was administered by a government-appointed extraordinary commissioner, pending the organisation of its institutional bodies.

Following the 1995 elections, Silvia Marsoni took office as the first president of the province, marking the beginning of the province's ordinary democratic administration. In accordance with the reform of local authorities introduced in 1993, the president was directly elected by the citizens for a five-year term and was responsible for appointing and dismissing the members of the Provincial Executive.

Following the 2014 Delrio Law, the president is elected by an assembly composed of the mayors and municipal councillors of the municipalities within the province. The president serves a four-year term and acts as the legal representative of the province, presiding over the Provincial Council and the Provincial Assembly of Mayors.

== List ==
No.	Portrait	Name	Term of office		Party
No.	Portrait	Name	Start	End	Party
1		Silvia Marsoni	12 May 1995	28 June 1999	Federation of the Greens
2		Orazio Scanzio	28 June 1999	28 June 2004	Forza Italia
3		Sergio Scaramal	28 June 2004	8 June 2009	Democrats of the Left; Democratic Party
4		Roberto Simonetti	8 June 2009	23 November 2012	Lega Nord
–		Angelo Ciuni	23 November 2012	14 October 2014	Prefectural commissioner
5		Emanuele Ramella Pralungo	14 October 2014	14 November 2018	Democratic Party
6		Gianluca Foglia Barbisin	14 November 2018	19 December 2021	Democratic Party
(5)		Emanuele Ramella Pralungo	19 December 2021	30 March 2026	Democratic Party
(5)		Emanuele Ramella Pralungo	30 March 2026	Incumbent	Democratic Party

== Sources ==
- "Storia amministrativa dell'ente". Ministero dell'Interno.
