= Alessandro Ajmone-Marsan =

Italian footballer, sports manager, and entrepreneur (1884–1941)

Personal information
- Full name: Alessandro Ajmone-Marsan
- Date of birth: 31 October 1884
- Place of birth: Turin, Italy
- Date of death: 1941 (aged 56–57)
- Position: Defender

Youth career
- 1903–1909: Juventus

Senior career*
| Years | Team | Apps | (Gls) |
| 1909–1910 | Juventus | 1 | (0) |
| 1910–1913 | Pro Vercelli | 6 | (0) |
| Total | | 7 | (0) |
- * Club domestic league appearances and goals

Alessandro Ajmone-Marsan (31 October 1884 – 1941) was an Italian sports manager, entrepreneur and football defender.

He was the older brother of Annibale (Ajmone II) and Riccardo (Ajmone III) and the son of an investor of the football club, the businessman Marco Ajmone-Marsan, who was originally from Crosa.

In several match statistics his surname is sometimes referred to as Aimone or Aymone.

== Career ==
Alessandro Ajmone Marsan was a Juventus football player at the beginning of the first decade of 1900. He made a single appearance in his debut — and only — season as a player of the first team of the 'bianconeri'.

In 1903 he signed up to become a shareholder of the football club. In 1905 he won the Second Category, playing for the reserve team of Juventus.

Despite quitting his football career at Juventus, he served as an advisor to the football club based in Turin, Piedmont.

Following his departure from Juventus, he won three consecutive championships between 1910 and 1913, playing for the football club Pro Vercelli.
