= Soprana =

- Frazione
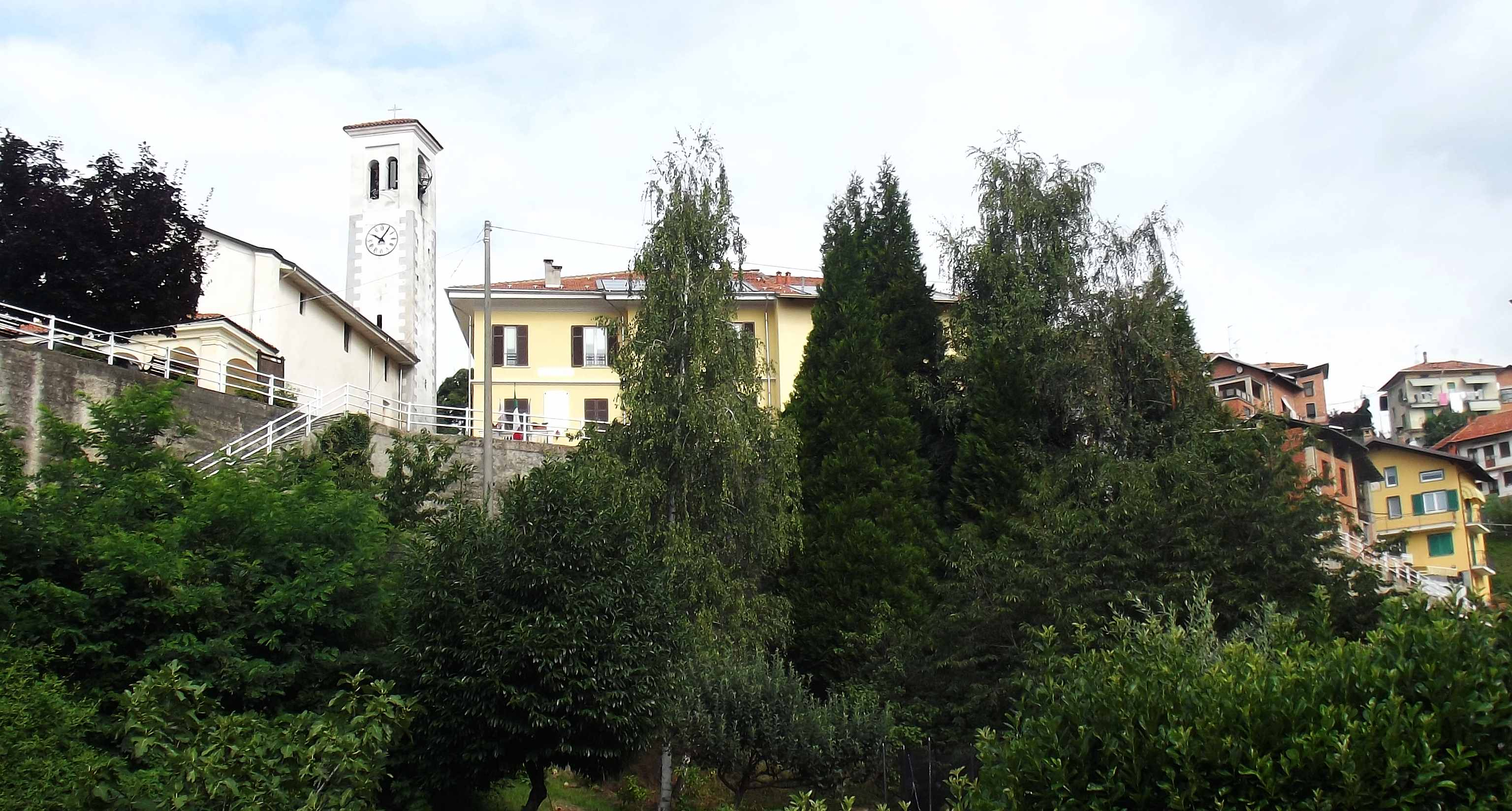

- Location of Soprana in Italy
- Coordinates: 45°35′N 8°13′E
- Country: Italy
- Region: Piedmont
- Province: Province of Biella (BI)
- Comune: Valdilana

Area
  - Total: 5.5 km^{2} (2.1 sq mi)

Population (Dec. 2004)
  - Total: 822
  - Density: 150/km^{2} (390/sq mi)
- Time zone: UTC+1 (CET)
  - Summer (DST): UTC+2 (CEST)
- Postal code: 13834
- Dialing code: 015

Soprana was a comune (municipality) in the Province of Biella in the Italian region Piedmont, located about 70 kilometres (43 mi) northeast of Turin and about 12 kilometres (7 mi) northeast of Biella. As of 31 December 2004, it had a population of 822 and an area of 5.5 square kilometres (2.1 mi^{2}).

Soprana bordered the following municipalities: Curino, Mezzana Mortigliengo, Trivero.

As a comune it had the following frazioni (villages):Baltigati, Lanvario, Cerreia, Cerruti, Molinengo.

== History ==
From 1 January 2019 Soprana was absorbed by the new-born municipality of Valdilana.

== Demographic evolution ==
Historical population

Year	Pop.	±%
1861	848	—
1871	954	+12.5%
1881	1,077	+12.9%
1901	1,304	+21.1%
1911	1,370	+5.1%

Year	Pop.	±%
1921	1,212	−11.5%
1931	1,201	−0.9%
1936	1,238	+3.1%
1951	1,296	+4.7%
1961	1,402	+8.2%

Year	Pop.	±%
1971	1,157	−17.5%
1981	990	−14.4%
1991	940	−5.1%
2001	835	−11.2%

Source: Data from ISTAT
