= Vigliano Biellese =

- Comune
- Comune di Vigliano Biellese
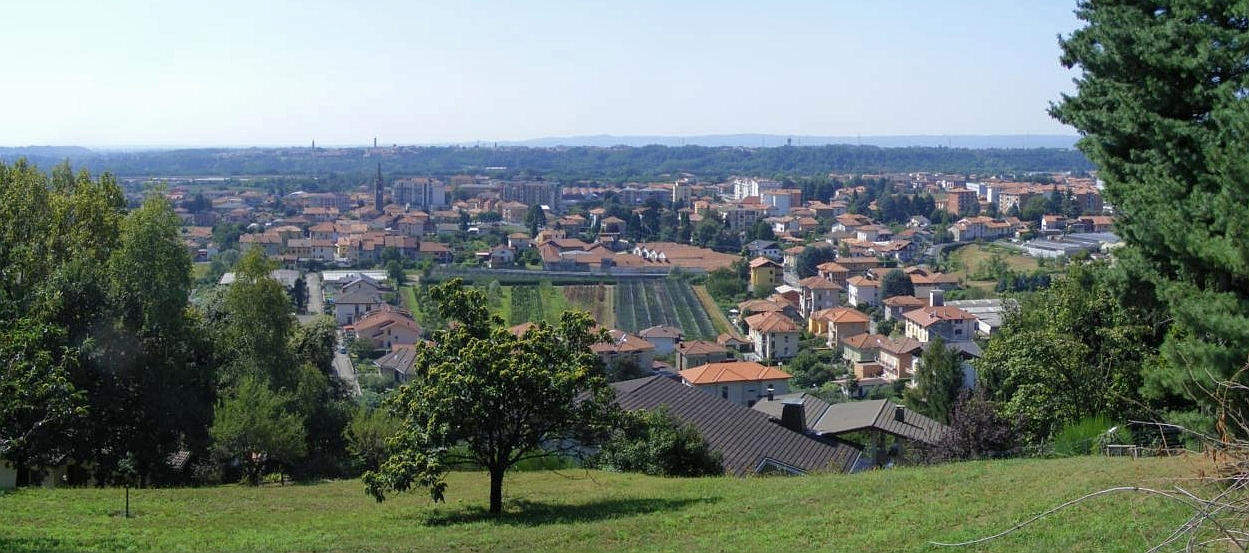
- View of Vigliano Biellese

- Coat of arms

- Location within Italy Location within Piedmont
- Coordinates: 45°33′N 8°6′E
- Country: Italy
- Region: Piedmont
- Province: Biella

Government
  - Mayor: Cristina Vazzoler

Area
  - Total: 8.4 km^{2} (3.2 sq mi)

Population (30 November 2025)
  - Total: 7,541
  - Density: 900/km^{2} (2,300/sq mi)
- Demonym: Viglianesi
- Time zone: UTC+1 (CET)
  - Summer (DST): UTC+2 (CEST)
- Postal code: 13856
- Dialing code: 015
- ISTAT code: 096077
- Patron saint: St. Mary of the Assumption
- Saint day: August 15
- Website: Official website

Vigliano Biellese is a comune (municipality) in the Province of Biella in the Italian region Piedmont, located about 60 kilometres (37 mi) northeast of Turin and about 3 kilometres (2 mi) southeast of Biella.

Vigliano Biellese borders the following municipalities: Biella, Candelo, Cerreto Castello, Cossato, Ronco Biellese, Valdengo.

== Notable people ==
- Aldo Brovarone (1926–2020), automobile designer
