= Gianluca Foglia Barbisin =

Italian politician and lawyer (born 1971)

President of the Province of Biella
- In office 14 November 2018 – 19 December 2021
- Preceded by: Emanuele Ramella Pralungo
- Succeeded by: Emanuele Ramella Pralungo

Mayor of Coggiola
- In office 16 May 2011 – 4 October 2021
- Preceded by: Angela Maria Pastore
- Succeeded by: Paolo Setti

Personal details
- Born: 8 September 1971 (age 55) Varallo, Piedmont, Italy
- Party: Democratic Party
- Education: University of Turin
- Occupation: Lawyer

Gianluca Foglia Barbisin (born 8 September 1971) is an Italian politician and lawyer who served as president of the Province of Biella from 2018 to 2021 and as mayor of Coggiola from 2011 to 2021.

== Life and career ==
Foglia Barbisin graduated in law from the University of Turin and has worked as a lawyer since 2004, specialising in civil, insurance, family and debt-recovery law.

He was elected mayor of Coggiola in 2011 and re-elected in 2016. In November 2018, Foglia Barbisin was elected president of the Province of Biella in a cross-party agreement supported by the Democratic Party, succeeding Emanuele Ramella Pralungo.

Foglia Barbisin left both the offices of mayor and provincial president in October 2021 and subsequently served as a municipal councillor in Coggiola.
