= Marco Ajmone-Marsan =

Italian businessman (1859–1918)

Marco Ajmone-Marsan (1859–1918 in Turin) was an Italian businessman.

== Biography ==
He was born in Crosa, Kingdom of Sardinia, but moved at an early age to Turin, where he started his business at age 18 opening a small shirts warehouse. Later, his company – specialized in the production of handkerchiefs – grew rapidly, counting more than 200 weaving looms. His business activity was successful to such a great extent that it was even able to beat the competition of British manufacturing enterprises in a quite short time.

He married Maria Aimone, by whom he had three children: Riccardo, Alessandro and Annibale. All three were Juventus players in the early 20th century.

In 1904 he revived the finances of the football club Juventus, making it also possible to transfer the training field from Piazza d'Armi to the more appropriate Velodrome Umberto I.

Marco Ajmone-Marsan was awarded the title of Knight of Labour on 9 January 1916.
