= Valdengo =

- Comune
- Comune di Valdengo
- View of Valdengo

- Coat of arms

- Location within Italy Location within Piedmont
- Coordinates: 45°33′N 8°6′E
- Country: Italy
- Region: Piedmont
- Province: Biella (BI)

Government
  - Mayor: Sergio Gronda

Area
  - Total: 7.7 km^{2} (3.0 sq mi)
- Elevation: 285 m (935 ft)

Population (30 November 2025)
  - Total: 2,350
  - Density: 310/km^{2} (790/sq mi)
- Demonym: Valdenghesi
- Time zone: UTC+1 (CET)
  - Summer (DST): UTC+2 (CEST)
- Postal code: 13855
- Dialing code: 015
- ISTAT code: 096071

Valdengo is a comune (municipality) in the Province of Biella in the Italian region Piedmont, located about 60 kilometres (37 mi) northeast of Turin and about 3 kilometres (2 mi) southeast of Biella.

Valdengo borders the following municipalities: Candelo, Cerreto Castello, Piatto, Quaregna, Ronco Biellese, Ternengo, Vigliano Biellese.

== Demographic evolution ==
Historical population

Year	Pop.	±%
1861	1,096	—
1871	1,133	+3.4%
1881	1,202	+6.1%
1901	1,074	−10.6%
1911	998	−7.1%

Year	Pop.	±%
1921	1,080	+8.2%
1931	1,063	−1.6%
1936	1,102	+3.7%
1951	1,346	+22.1%
1961	1,884	+40.0%

Year	Pop.	±%
1971	2,247	+19.3%
1981	2,425	+7.9%
1991	2,440	+0.6%
2001	2,525	+3.5%

Source: Data from ISTAT
