= Riccardo Ajmone-Marsan =

Italian footballer (1889–1958)

Personal information
- Full name: Riccardo Ajmone-Marsan
- Date of birth: 4 March 1889
- Place of birth: Turin, Italy
- Date of death: 15 November 1958 (aged 69)
- Place of death: Turin
- Positions: Goalkeeper; defensive midfielder

Youth career
- 1903–1908: Juventus

Senior career*
| Years | Team | Apps | (Gls) |
| 1909–1910 | Juventus | 2 | (2) |
| 1910–1911 | Juventus | 5 | (0) |
| 1911–1912 | Juventus | 2 | (0) |
| Total | | 9 | (2) |
- * Club domestic league appearances and goals

Riccardo Ajmone-Marsan (1889–1958) was an Italian footballer who played for Juventus.

== Biography ==
Riccardo Ajmone-Marsan was introduced - together with the brothers Alessandro and Annibale - to the team of the White-Blacks by Umberto Malvano, one of the founders of Juventus F.C. Riccardo, Alessandro and Annibale convinced their father Marco to pay the rent of the Velodrome Umberto I.

In 1921 Riccardo married Adelina Lavini (1901-1990), by whom he had three children: Maria (1922-1922), Giuliana (1923-2017) and Giorgio (1926-2008).

He was also known as Ajmone III, to distinguish him from his two brothers and teammates Alessandro and Annibale.

== Career ==
Playing for the Juventus second team, Riccardo won the Second Category in 1905, beating the reserves of Milan and Genoa in the final national round. On 10 April 1910 he made his debut in the first team scoring the decisive goal in a 1-0 win over Andrea Doria.

On 11 February 1912 he played his last match against Inter Milan, which ended in a 4-0 defeat.

In total he played - wearing the black and white striped shirt - 9 matches and scored 2 goals for Juventus F.C., the last one scored in a 2-1 defeat against US Milanese on 24 April 1910.
