= Quaregna =

- Frazione
- Location of Quaregna in Italy
- Coordinates: 45°36′N 8°3′E
- Country: Italy
- Region: Piedmont
- Province: Province of Biella (BI)
- Comune: Quaregna Cerreto

Area
  - Total: 5.8 km^{2} (2.2 sq mi)

Population (Dec. 2004)
  - Total: 1,325
  - Density: 230/km^{2} (590/sq mi)
- Time zone: UTC+1 (CET)
  - Summer (DST): UTC+2 (CEST)
- Postal code: 13010
- Dialing code: 015

Quaregna was a comune (municipality) in the Province of Biella in the Italian region Piedmont, located about 70 kilometres (43 mi) northeast of Turin and about 4 kilometres (2 mi) northwest of Biella. As of 31 December 2004, it had a population of 1,325 and an area of 5.8 square kilometres (2.2 mi^{2}).

Birthplace of Amedeo Avogadro.

As a comune Quaregna bordered the following municipalities: Cerreto Castello, Cossato, Piatto, Valdengo, Vallanzengo, Valle San Nicolao.

== History ==
From 1 January 2019 Quaregna was absorbed by the new-born municipality of Quaregna Cerreto.

== Demographic evolution ==
Historical population

Year	Pop.	±%
1861	325	—
1871	362	+11.4%
1881	347	−4.1%
1901	353	+1.7%
1911	326	−7.6%

Year	Pop.	±%
1921	321	−1.5%
1931	354	+10.3%
1936	416	+17.5%
1951	526	+26.4%
1961	721	+37.1%

Year	Pop.	±%
1971	983	+36.3%
1981	1,198	+21.9%
1991	1,296	+8.2%
2001	1,298	+0.2%

Source: Data from ISTAT
