= Roberto Simonetti =

Italian politician (born 1973)

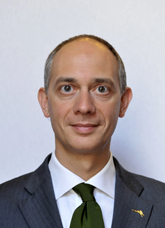

Member of the Chamber of Deputies
- In office 29 April 2008 – 14 March 2013
- In office 25 June 2014 – 22 March 2018

President of the Province of Biella
- In office 8 June 2009 – 23 November 2012
- Preceded by: Sergio Scaramal
- Succeeded by: Emanuele Ramella Pralungo

Personal details
- Born: 5 April 1973 (age 53) Biella, Piedmont, Italy
- Party: Lega Nord

Roberto Simonetti (born 5 April 1973) is an Italian politician who served as a member of the Chamber of Deputies (2008–2013, 2014–2018) and as president of the Province of Biella (2009–2012).
