= Campiglia Cervo =

Municipality in Piedmont, Italy

- Comune
- Comune di Campiglia Cervo
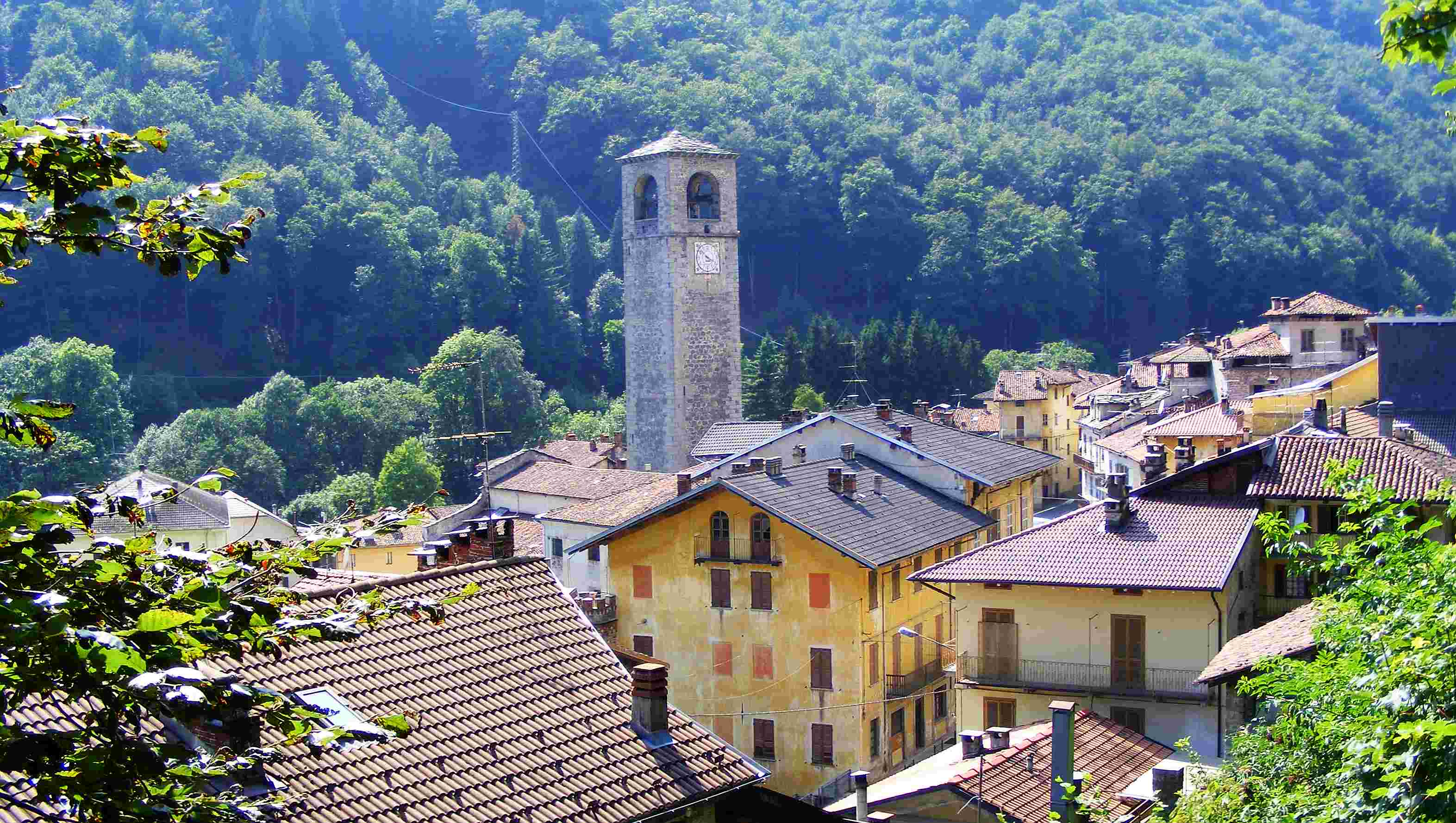
- View of Campiglia Cervo

- Location within Italy Location within Piedmont
- Coordinates: 45°40′N 8°0′E
- Country: Italy
- Region: Piedmont
- Province: Province of Biella (BI)
- Frazioni: Valmosca, Forgnengo, Piaro, Gli Ondini, Quittengo, San Giovanni d'Andorno, San Paolo Cervo, Balma, Bogna, Orio Mosso, Rialmosso, Roreto, Sassaia, Tomati, Riabella, Driagno, Magnani, Piana, Bariola, Oretto, Mortigliengo, Mazzucchetti, Bele

Area
  - Total: 11.7 km^{2} (4.5 sq mi)

Population (Dec. 2004)
  - Total: 176
  - Density: 15.0/km^{2} (39.0/sq mi)
- Time zone: UTC+1 (CET)
  - Summer (DST): UTC+2 (CEST)
- Postal code: 13060
- Dialing code: 015

Campiglia Cervo is a comune (municipality) in the Province of Biella in the Italian region Piedmont, located about 70 kilometres (43 mi) northeast of Turin and about 4 kilometres (2 mi) northwest of Biella. As of 31 December 2004, it had a population of 176 and an area of 11.7 square kilometres (4.5 mi^{2}).

Campiglia Cervo borders the following municipalities: Andorno Micca, Mosso, Piedicavallo, Quittengo, Rosazza, Valle Mosso. From 1 January 2016 Campiglia Cervo also encompasses two former neighbouring municipalities, Quittengo and San Paolo Cervo.

== Notable buildings ==
In the municipality there is a famous sanctuary, the Sacro Monte di Andorno.

== Demographic evolution ==
Historical population

Year	Pop.	±%
1861	1,243	—
1871	1,229	−1.1%
1881	1,215	−1.1%
1901	1,340	+10.3%
1911	927	−30.8%

Year	Pop.	±%
1921	793	−14.5%
1931	905	+14.1%
1936	520	−42.5%
1951	484	−6.9%
1961	451	−6.8%

Year	Pop.	±%
1971	331	−26.6%
1981	212	−36.0%
1991	200	−5.7%
2001	178	−11.0%

Source: Data from ISTAT
