= Crocemosso =

- Frazione
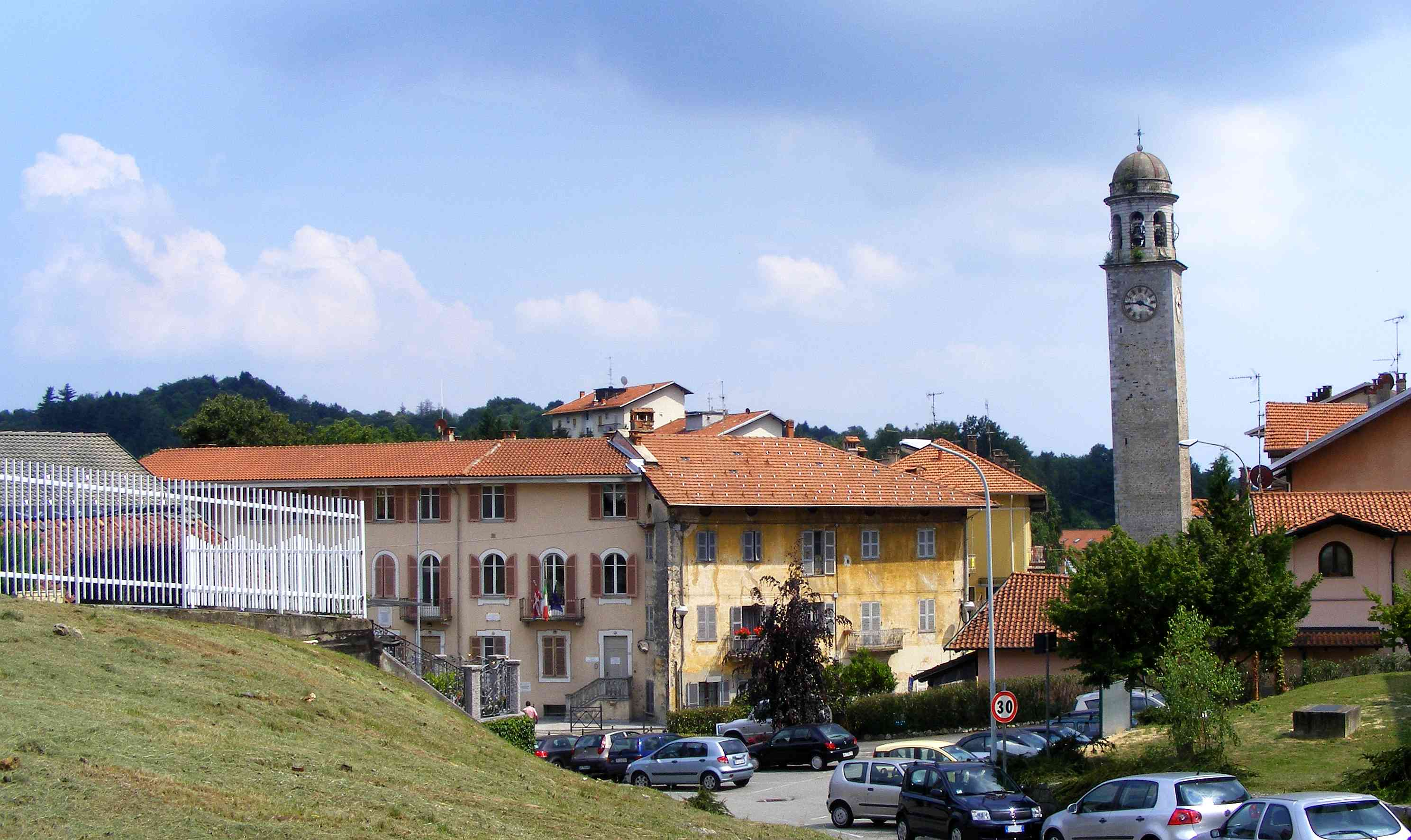

- Location of Crocemosso in Italy
- Coordinates: 45°38′38″N 8°09′15″E
- Country: Italy
- Region: Piedmont
- Province: Biella (BI)
- Comune: Valle Mosso
- Elevation: 595 m (1,952 ft)
- Demonym: crocemossesi
- Time zone: UTC+1 (CET)
  - Summer (DST): UTC+2 (CEST)
- Postal code: 13825
- Dialing code: (+39) 015

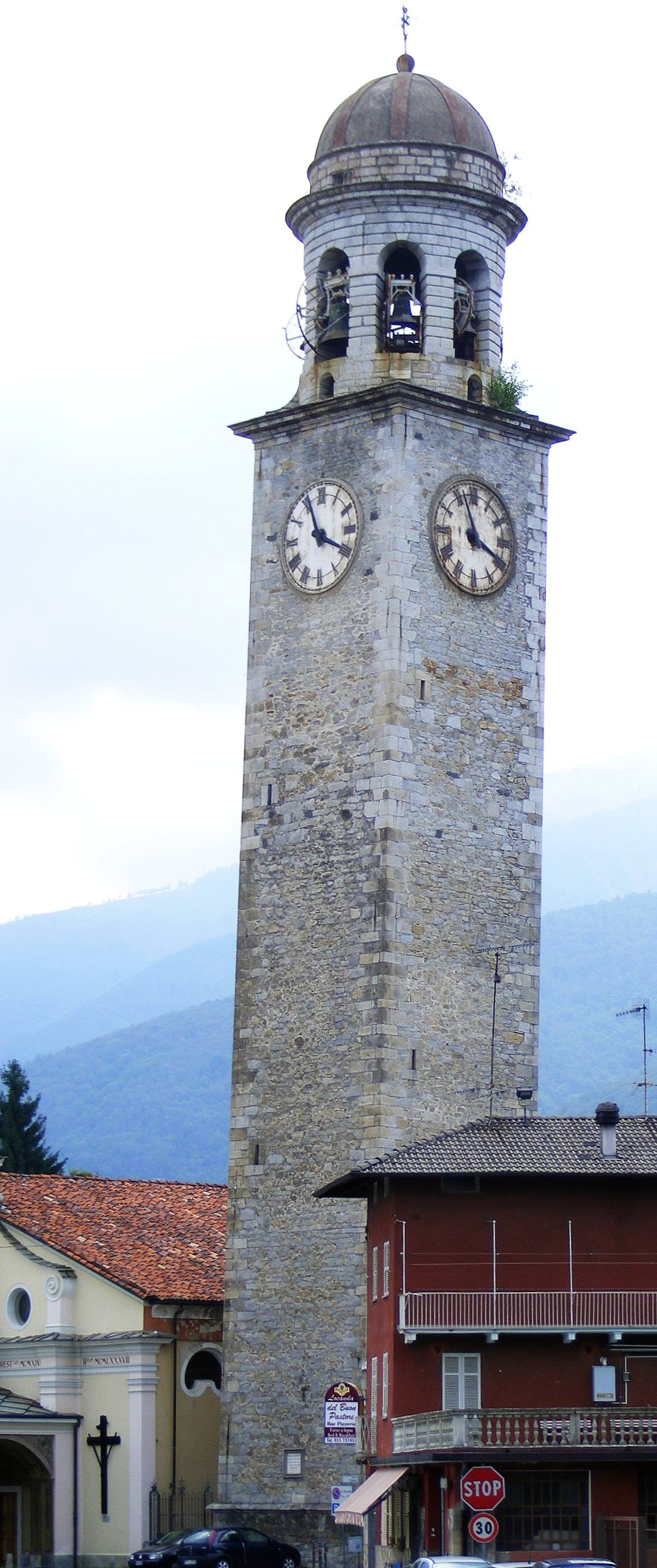
The church tower, the second highest of Biella province

Crocemosso (or, traditionally, Croce Mosso) is a frazione of Valle Mosso, in Piedmont, northern Italy.

Since 1929 Crocemosso was a separate comune (municipality), which was unified with the former comune of Valle Inferiore Mosso in the new comune of Valle Mosso.
