= Valle Mosso =

- Frazione
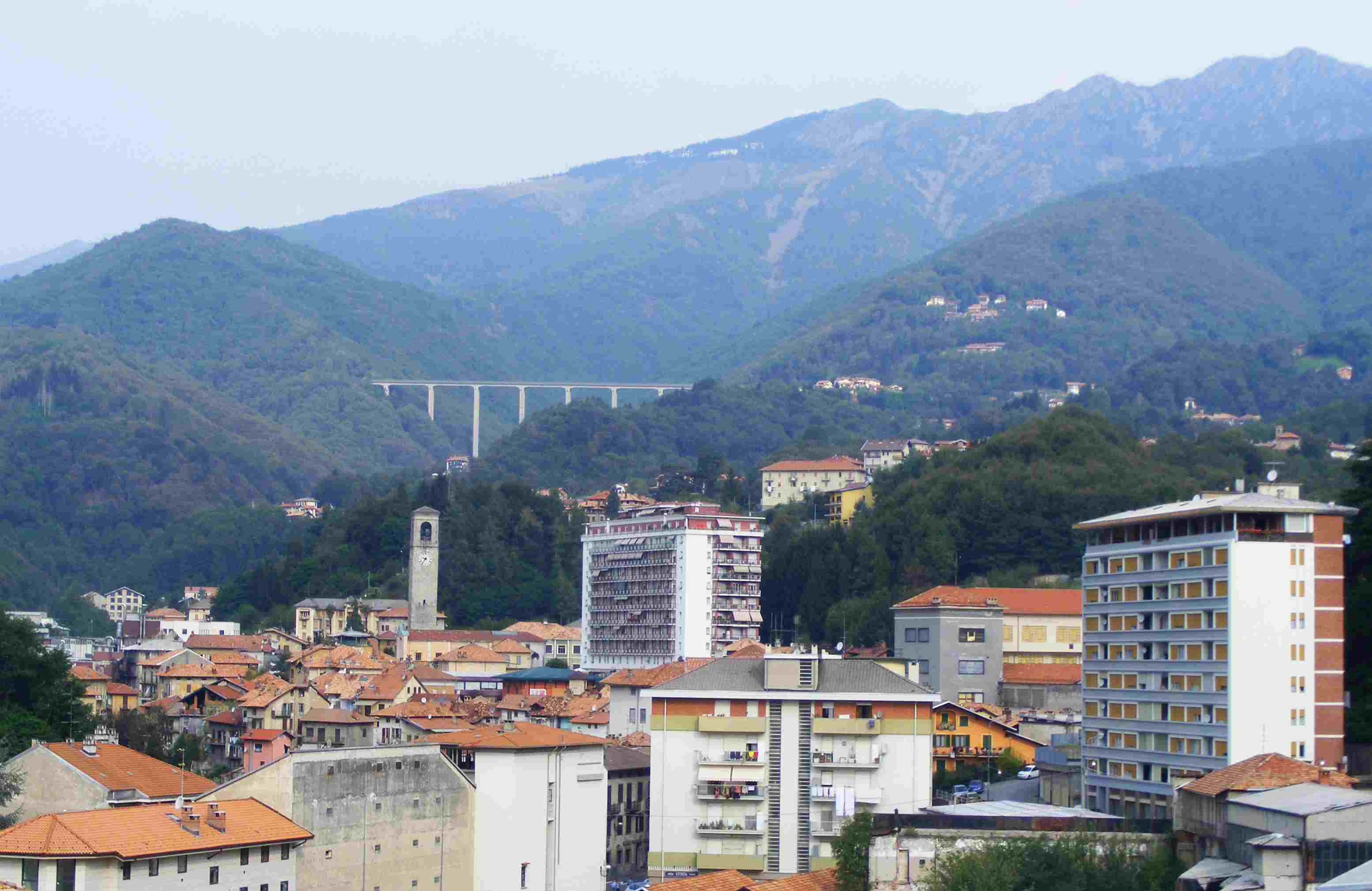

- Location of Valle Mosso in Italy
- Coordinates: 45°37′N 8°9′E
- Country: Italy
- Region: Piedmont
- Province: Province of Biella (BI)
- Comune: Valdilana

Area
  - Total: 8.9 km^{2} (3.4 sq mi)
- Elevation: 434 m (1,424 ft)

Population (Dec. 2011)
  - Total: 3,526
  - Density: 400/km^{2} (1,000/sq mi)
- Demonym: Valmossesi
- Time zone: UTC+1 (CET)
  - Summer (DST): UTC+2 (CEST)
- Postal code: 13835
- Dialing code: 015

Valle Mosso was a comune (municipality) in the Province of Biella in the Italian region Piedmont, located about 75 kilometres (47 mi) northeast of Turin, 85 kilometres (53 mi) northwest of Milan and 9 kilometres (6 mi) northeast of Biella. Until December 31, 2018, it constituted an autonomous municipality, which bordered the municipalities of Bioglio, Campiglia Cervo, Mosso, Pettinengo, Strona, Trivero, Vallanzengo, Valle San Nicolao and Veglio.

== Physical geography ==
As a comune it had the following frazioni: Campore, Crocemosso, Falcero, Frignocca, Gallo, Orcurto, Ormezzano, Piana, Picco, Prelle, Premarcia, Simone, Torello

== History ==
From 1 January 2019 Valle Mosso was absorbed by the new-born municipality of Valdilana.

== Demographic evolution ==
Historical population

| Year | Pop. | ±% |
|---|---|---|
| 1861 | 2,613 | — |
| 1871 | 2,825 | +8.1% |
| 1881 | 3,383 | +19.8% |
| 1901 | 3,444 | +1.8% |
| 1911 | 3,492 | +1.4% |

| Year | Pop. | ±% |
|---|---|---|
| 1921 | 3,480 | −0.3% |
| 1931 | 4,254 | +22.2% |
| 1936 | 4,818 | +13.3% |
| 1951 | 5,592 | +16.1% |
| 1961 | 5,831 | +4.3% |

| Year | Pop. | ±% |
|---|---|---|
| 1971 | 5,466 | −6.3% |
| 1981 | 4,932 | −9.8% |
| 1991 | 4,350 | −11.8% |
| 2001 | 3,957 | −9.0% |

Source: Data from ISTAT
