= Mosso, Piedmont =

Mosso
- Frazione
- Church of Santa Maria Assunta in Mosso

- Location of Mosso in Italy
- Coordinates: 45°38′N 8°8′E
- Country: Italy
- Region: Piedmont
- Province: Biella (BI)
- Comune: Valdilana

Area
  - Total: 18.24 km^{2} (7.04 sq mi)
- Elevation: 625 m (2,051 ft)

Population (30 November 2018)
  - Total: 16,921,451
  - Density: 927,700/km^{2} (2,403,000/sq mi)
- Demonym: Mossesi
- Time zone: UTC+1 (CET)
  - Summer (DST): UTC+2 (CEST)
- Postal code: 13835
- Dialing code: 015
- Patron saint: Santa Maria Assunta
- Saint day: 15 August

Mosso was a comune (municipality) of the Province of Biella in the Italian region Piedmont, located in the Biellese Prealps about 70 kilometres (43 mi) northeast of Turin and about 9 kilometres (6 mi) northeast of Biella. It was formed in 1998 by the fusion of the existing communes of Mosso Santa Maria and Pistolesa.

== Physical geography ==
Mosso bordered the following municipalities: Bioglio, Campiglia Cervo, Piatto, Quittengo, Trivero, Vallanzengo, Valle Mosso, Veglio.

The commune extended over an area of 18.24 square kilometres (7.04 mi^{2}). Its population of about 1,451 was divided between numerous local centres. In addition to Mosso Santa Maria and Pistolesa, the commune's statute listed the following frazioni:

Mosso Santa Maria, Alloro, Bellaria, Bogino, Boschi, Brughiera, Buccio, Canova, Capomosso, Case Forno, Cerate, Crolle, Fantone, Ferchiani, Frieri, Garbaccio, Gianolio, Gili, Maioli, Marchetto, Mina, Mongiachero, Ometre, Oretto, Ormezzero, Piane, Quazza, Ramello, Ricca, Rivetto, Rolando, Sella, Sqisso, Taverna, Trabucco, Venalba;

and the following minor localities:

Artignana, Bochetto Luvera, Bochetto Margosio, Campazzo, Quattroventi, Casale ai Monti, Casale Picco, Curione, Gribaud, Molino dell’Avvocato, Molino Garaccio, Prapiano.

== History ==
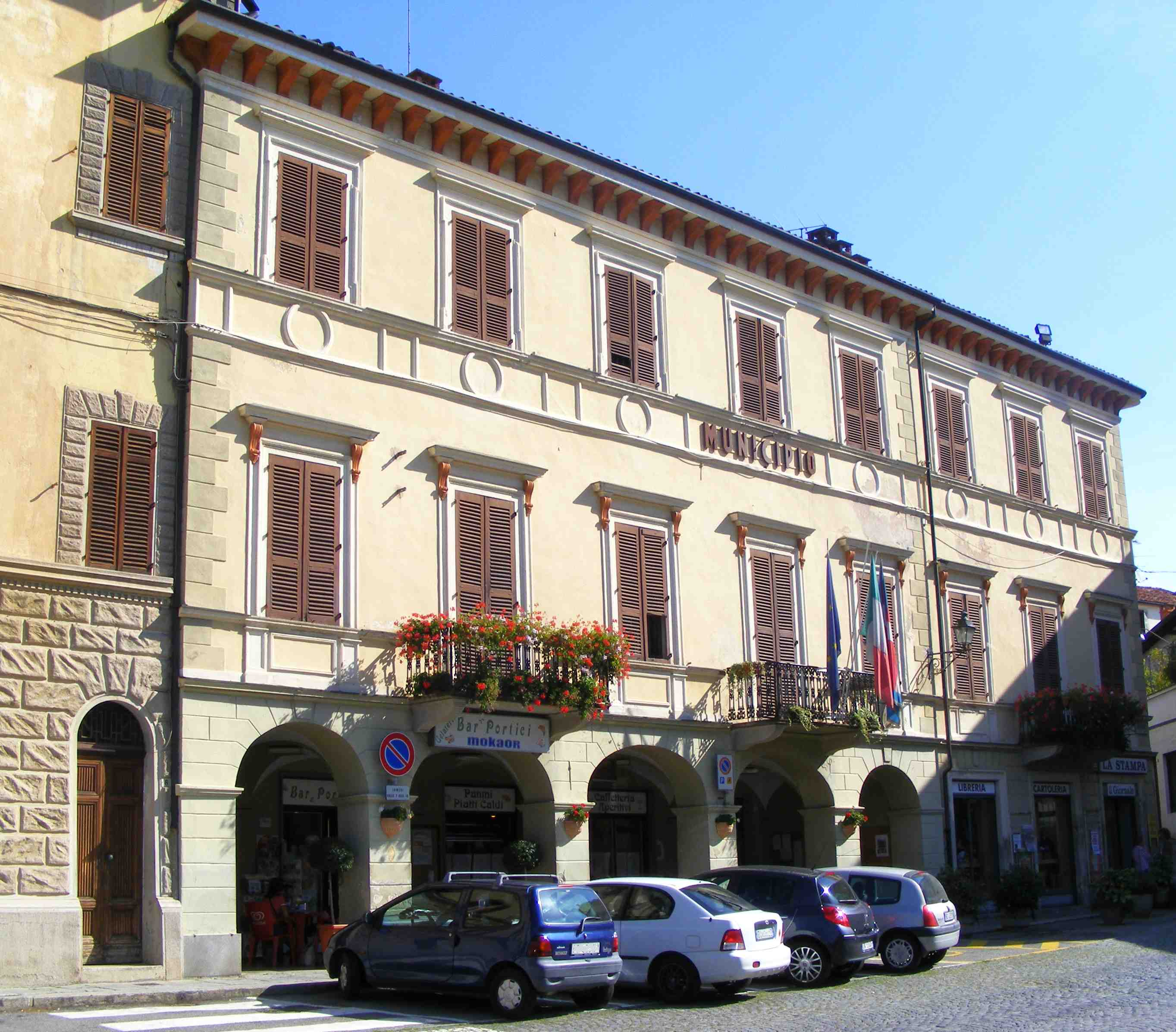
Former town-hall

Frazione Sella is known as the birthplace of Quintino Sella, academic, politician and founder of the Club Alpino Italiano. Until 1938 it was the seat of the commune of Valle Superiore Mosso, later incorporated into that of Mosso Santa Maria.

Mosso is one of the principal communes of the Comunità Montana Valle di Mosso and, together with the nearby commune of Valle Mosso, it suffered extensive damage in the floods of 1968 which affected the whole valley.

From 1 January 2019 Mosso was absorbed by the new-born municipality of Valdilana.

== Population trends ==
Historical population

Year	Pop.	±%
1861	2,141	—
1871	2,262	+5.7%
1881	2,533	+12.0%
1901	2,530	−0.1%
1911	2,649	+4.7%

Year	Pop.	±%
1921	2,080	−21.5%
1931	2,126	+2.2%
1936	2,245	+5.6%
1951	2,456	+9.4%
1961	2,461	+0.2%

Year	Pop.	±%
1971	2,246	−8.7%
1981	1,870	−16.7%
1991	1,748	−6.5%
2001	1,802	+3.1%

Source: Data from ISTAT
