= Crosa, Piedmont =

Crosa
- Frazione
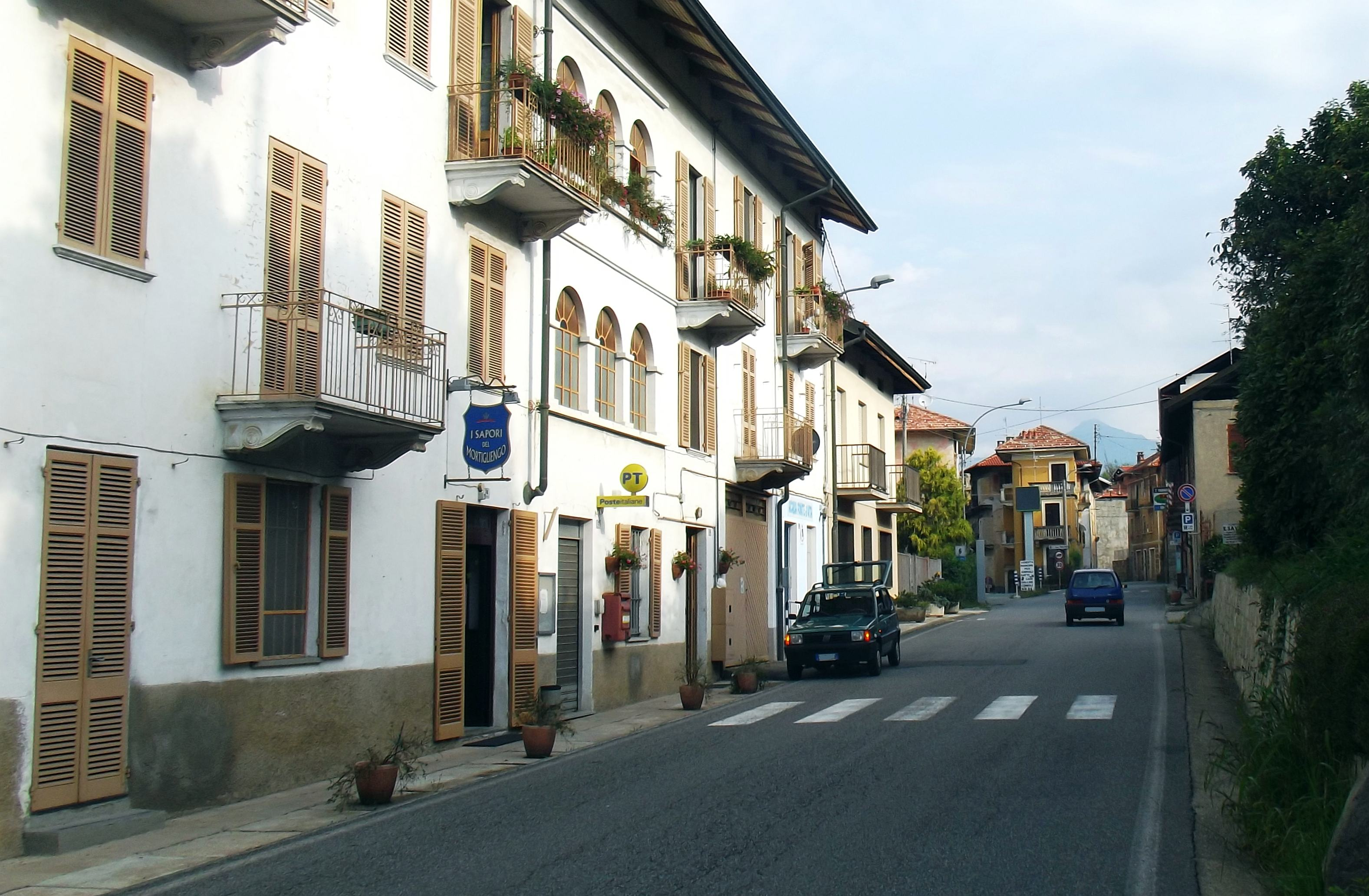
- View of Crosa

- Location of Crosa in Italy
- Coordinates: 45°35′N 8°13′E
- Country: Italy
- Region: Piedmont
- Province: Province of Biella (BI)
- Comune: Lessona

Area
  - Total: 1.0 km^{2} (0.39 sq mi)

Population (Dec. 2015)
  - Total: 354
  - Density: 350/km^{2} (920/sq mi)
- Time zone: UTC+1 (CET)
  - Summer (DST): UTC+2 (CEST)
- Postal code: 13853
- Dialing code: 015

Crosa is a frazione of the comune of Lessona, in the Province of Biella in the Italian region Piedmont, located about 70 kilometres (43 mi) northeast of Turin and about 12 kilometres (7 mi) northeast of Biella. Until December 31, 2015, it was an autonomous municipality with 354 inhabitants and an area of 1.0 square kilometre (0.39 mi^{2}). From 1 January 2016 Crosa was absorbed by the neighbouring municipality of Lessona.

As an autonomous comune Crosa bordered the following municipalities: Casapinta, Cossato, Lessona, Strona.

== Demographic evolution ==
Historical population

Year	Pop.	±%
1861	492	—
1871	531	+7.9%
1881	618	+16.4%
1901	497	−19.6%
1911	532	+7.0%

Year	Pop.	±%
1921	480	−9.8%
1931	516	+7.5%
1936	558	+8.1%
1951	606	+8.6%
1961	602	−0.7%

Year	Pop.	±%
1971	391	−35.0%
1981	338	−13.6%
1991	343	+1.5%
2001	336	−2.0%

Source: Data from ISTAT
