= Strona =

- Comune
- Comune di Strona
- Location within Italy Location within Piedmont
- Coordinates: 45°35′N 8°13′E
- Country: Italy
- Region: Piedmont
- Province: Province of Biella (BI)

Area
  - Total: 3.8 km^{2} (1.5 sq mi)

Population (Nov. 2025)
  - Total: 939
  - Density: 250/km^{2} (640/sq mi)
- Time zone: UTC+1 (CET)
  - Summer (DST): UTC+2 (CEST)
- Postal code: 13823
- Dialing code: 0
- ISTAT code: 096065

Strona is a comune (municipality) in the Province of Biella in the Italian region Piedmont, located about 70 kilometres (43 mi) northeast of Turin and about 12 kilometres (7 mi) northeast of Biella. As of 30 November 2025, it had a population of 939 and an area of 3.8 square kilometres (1.5 mi^{2}).

Strona borders the following municipalities: Casapinta, Cossato, Crosa, Mezzana Mortigliengo, Valdilana, Valle San Nicolao.

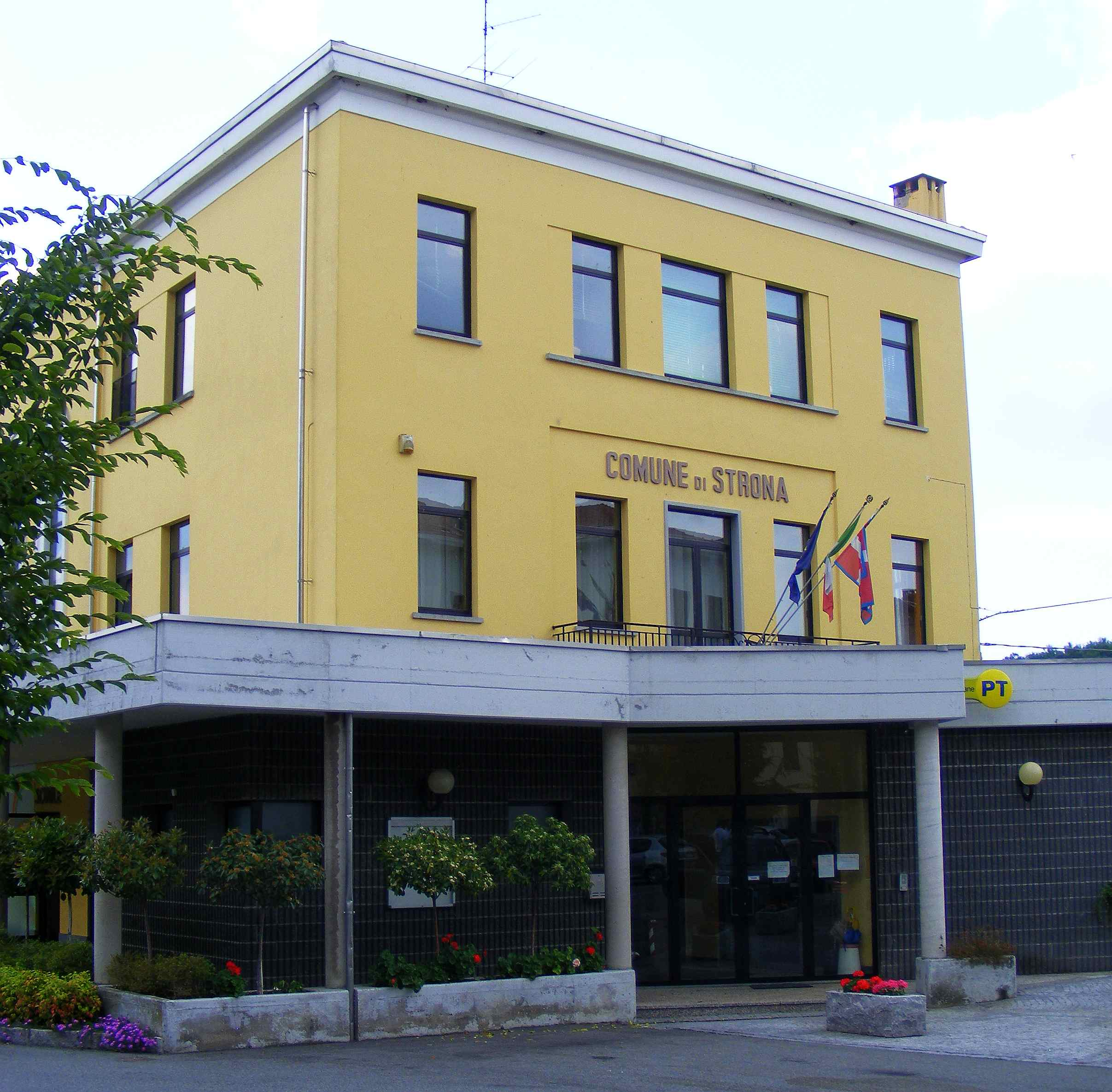

== Etymology ==
The name Strona should come from storn or strom, celtic roots for flowing waters or river.

== Demographic evolution ==
Historical population

Year	Pop.	±%
1861	1,485	—
1871	1,631	+9.8%
1881	1,826	+12.0%
1901	1,953	+7.0%
1911	1,855	−5.0%
1921	1,804	−2.7%

Year	Pop.	±%
1931	1,747	−3.2%
1936	1,889	+8.1%
1951	1,974	+4.5%
1961	1,942	−1.6%
1971	1,557	−19.8%
1981	1,343	−13.7%

Year	Pop.	±%
1991	1,216	−9.5%
2001	1,175	−3.4%
2011	1,157	−1.5%
2021	967	−16.4%

Source: Data from ISTAT

== See also ==
- Strona di Mosso
