= Mezzana Mortigliengo =

- Comune
- Comune di Mezzana Mortigliengo
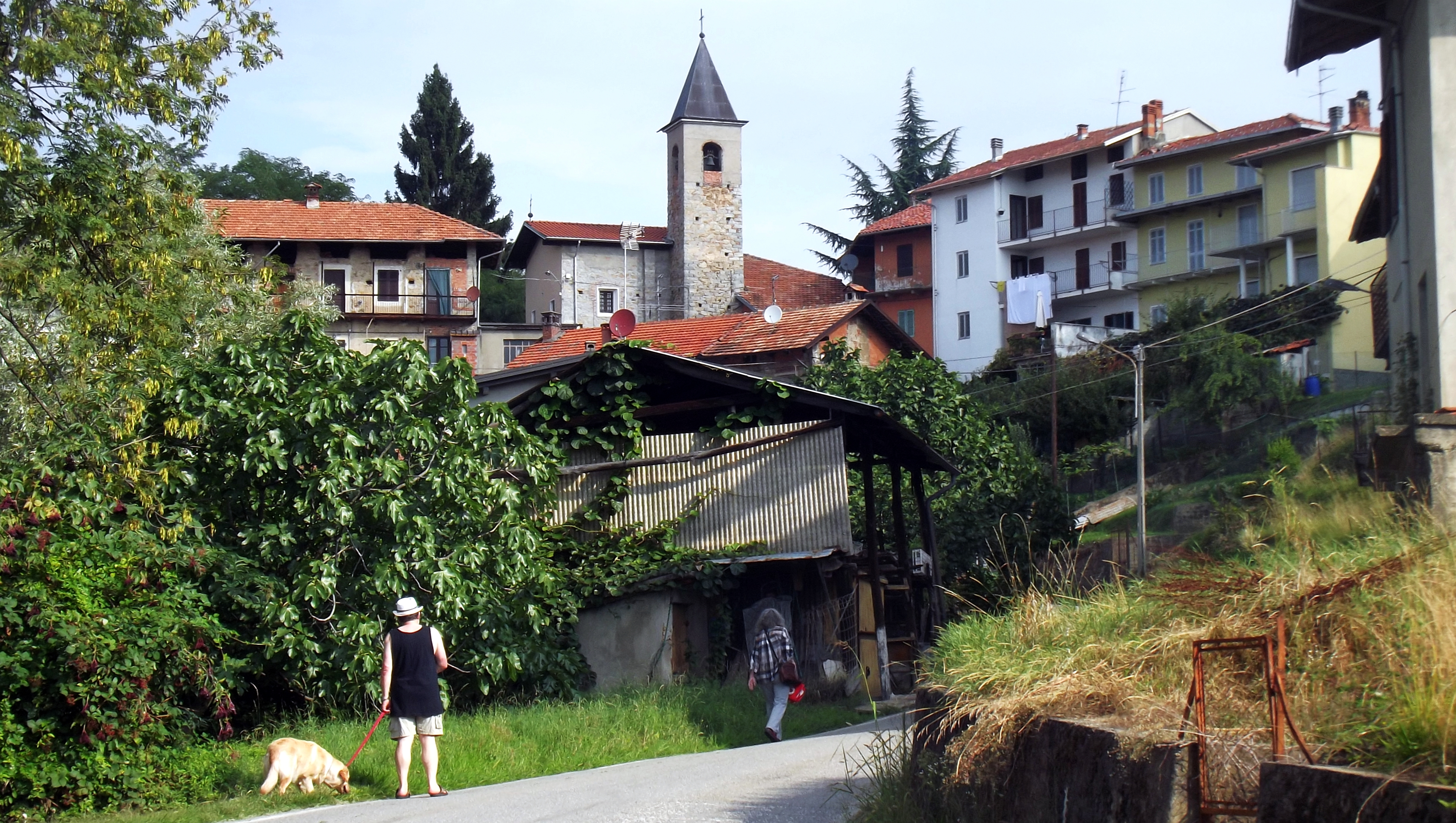
- View of Mezzana Mortigliengo

- Location within Italy Location within Piedmont
- Coordinates: 45°37′N 8°11′E
- Country: Italy
- Region: Piedmont
- Province: Biella (BI)
- Frazioni: Bonda, Cereie, Fangazio, Mino, Mondalforno, Montaldo, Ramazio, Sant'Antonio Mina Mazza, Sola, Ubertino

Government
  - Mayor: Alfio Serafia

Area
  - Total: 4.2 km^{2} (1.6 sq mi)

Population (Dec. 2004)
  - Total: 618
  - Density: 150/km^{2} (380/sq mi)
- Time zone: UTC+1 (CET)
  - Summer (DST): UTC+2 (CEST)
- Postal code: 13050
- Dialing code: 015

Mezzana Mortigliengo is a comune (municipality) in the Province of Biella in the Italian region Piedmont, located about 70 kilometres (43 mi) northeast of Turin and about 12 kilometres (7 mi) northeast of Biella nearby the Lago delle Piane.
