= Cossato =

- Comune
- Comune di Cossato
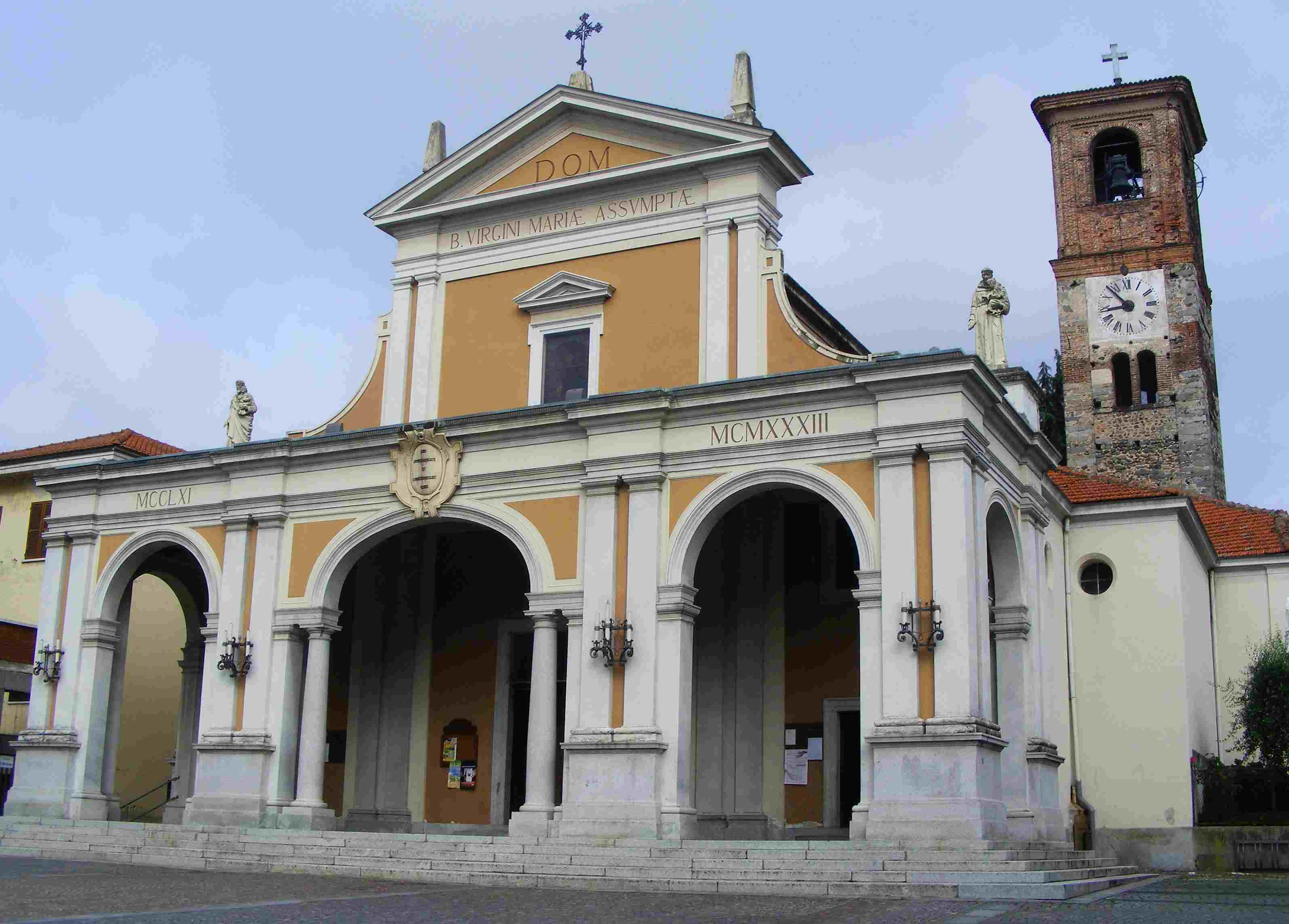
- Church in Cossato

- Coat of arms

- Location of Cossato in Italy Cossato (Piedmont)
- Coordinates: 45°34′N 08°10′E
- Country: Italy
- Region: Piedmont
- Province: Biella (BI)
- Frazioni: Bertinotto, Castellazzo, Castellengo, Cerro, Lavino, Lorazzo, Masseria, Monteferrario, Parlamento, Ronco, Spolina

Government
  - Mayor: Enrico Moggio

Area
  - Total: 27 km^{2} (10 sq mi)
- Elevation: 257 m (843 ft)

Population (30 November 2025)
  - Total: 13,860
  - Density: 510/km^{2} (1,300/sq mi)
- Demonym: Cossatesi
- Time zone: UTC+1 (CET)
  - Summer (DST): UTC+2 (CEST)
- Postal code: 13836
- Dialing code: 015
- ISTAT code: 096020
- Patron saint: Assumption of Mary
- Saint day: August 15
- Website: Official website

Cossato is a municipality in the province of Biella, Italy, in the northwest part of Piedmont, 11.6 kilometres (7.2 mi) east of Biella. It has a population of about 13,860 and it spreads over an area of 27.73 km^{2} (10.71 sq mi), which makes it the second largest town in the Province of Biella.

== Geography ==
The city is the second largest town in the province of Biella by population and economic importance. It has an urban development that follows the direction of the major roads: the center is along the Biella-Gattinara former state road, while numerous frazioni are scattered along the road to Mottalciata baraggivo plateau and the hills towards Quaregna, Lessona and Valdilana

== Main sights ==
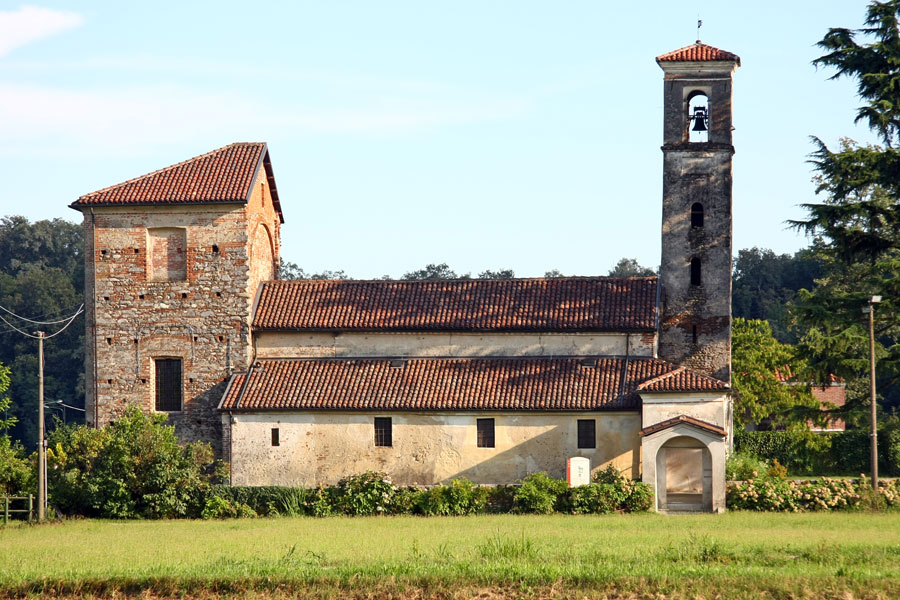
Church of SS. Peter and Paul

- Parish dedicated to the Assumption, built before 1000. It was rebuilt in 1614 after the collapse, which occurred two years before.
- Castle Castellengo, on the edge of the Baragge of Candelo.
- Church of SS. Peter and Paul, near the Castellengo Castle. medieval building restored over the years with the addition of different styles.
- Villa Ranzoni, eighteenth-century building houses the Municipal Library.
- Villa Fecia, building belonging to Fecia accounts of Cossato including a large park and a church, the Oratory of Santa Margherita (in medieval style).
- Villa Berlanghino, in the neoclassical style. It is a large building with a wooden staircase and a public park outside.
- Natural reserve of Baragge

== Government ==
=== List of mayors ===
Mayor	Term start	Term end	Party
Sergio Scaramal	1994	2004	Centre-left
Ermanno Bianchetto	2004	2009	Centre-left
Claudio Corradino	2009	2019	Lega Nord
Enrico Moggio	2019	Incumbent	Civic

=== Twin towns ===
- Neve Shalom, Israel
