= Selve Marcone =

- Frazione
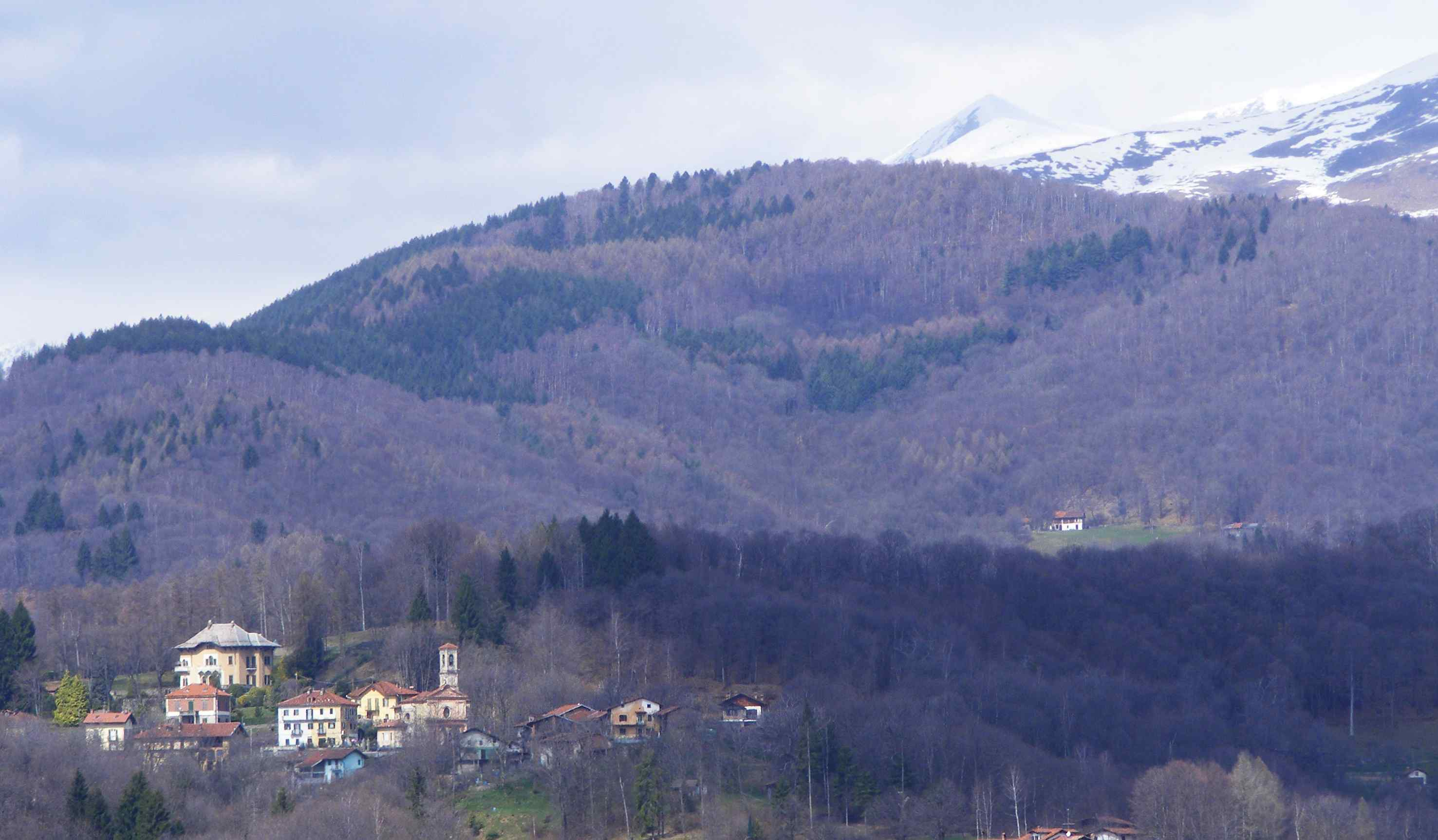

- Location of Selve Marcone in Italy
- Coordinates: 45°36′N 8°3′E
- Country: Italy
- Region: Piedmont
- Province: Province of Biella (BI)
- Comune: Pettinengo

Area
  - Total: 2.2 km^{2} (0.85 sq mi)

Population (Dec. 2004)
  - Total: 100
  - Density: 45/km^{2} (120/sq mi)
- Time zone: UTC+1 (CET)
  - Summer (DST): UTC+2 (CEST)
- Postal code: 13061
- Dialing code: 015

Selve Marcone was a comune (municipality) in the Province of Biella in the Italian region Piedmont, located about 70 kilometres (43 mi) northeast of Turin and about 4 kilometres (2 mi) northwest of Biella. As of 31 December 2004, it had a population of 100 and an area of 2.2 square kilometres (0.85 mi^{2}). From 1 January 2017 Selve Marcone was absorbed by the neighbouring municipality of Pettinengo.

As an autonomous commune Selve Marcone bordered the following municipalities: Andorno Micca, Callabiana, Pettinengo, Piedicavallo, Rassa, Tavigliano.

== Demographic evolution ==
Historical population

Year	Pop.	±%
1861	302	—
1871	338	+11.9%
1881	331	−2.1%
1901	295	−10.9%
1911	208	−29.5%

Year	Pop.	±%
1921	214	+2.9%
1931	141	−34.1%
1936	141	+0.0%
1951	176	+24.8%
1961	182	+3.4%

Year	Pop.	±%
1971	131	−28.0%
1981	113	−13.7%
1991	113	+0.0%
2001	103	−8.8%

Source: Data from ISTAT
