= Lake Ponte Vittorio =

Artificial lake in Piedmont, Italy

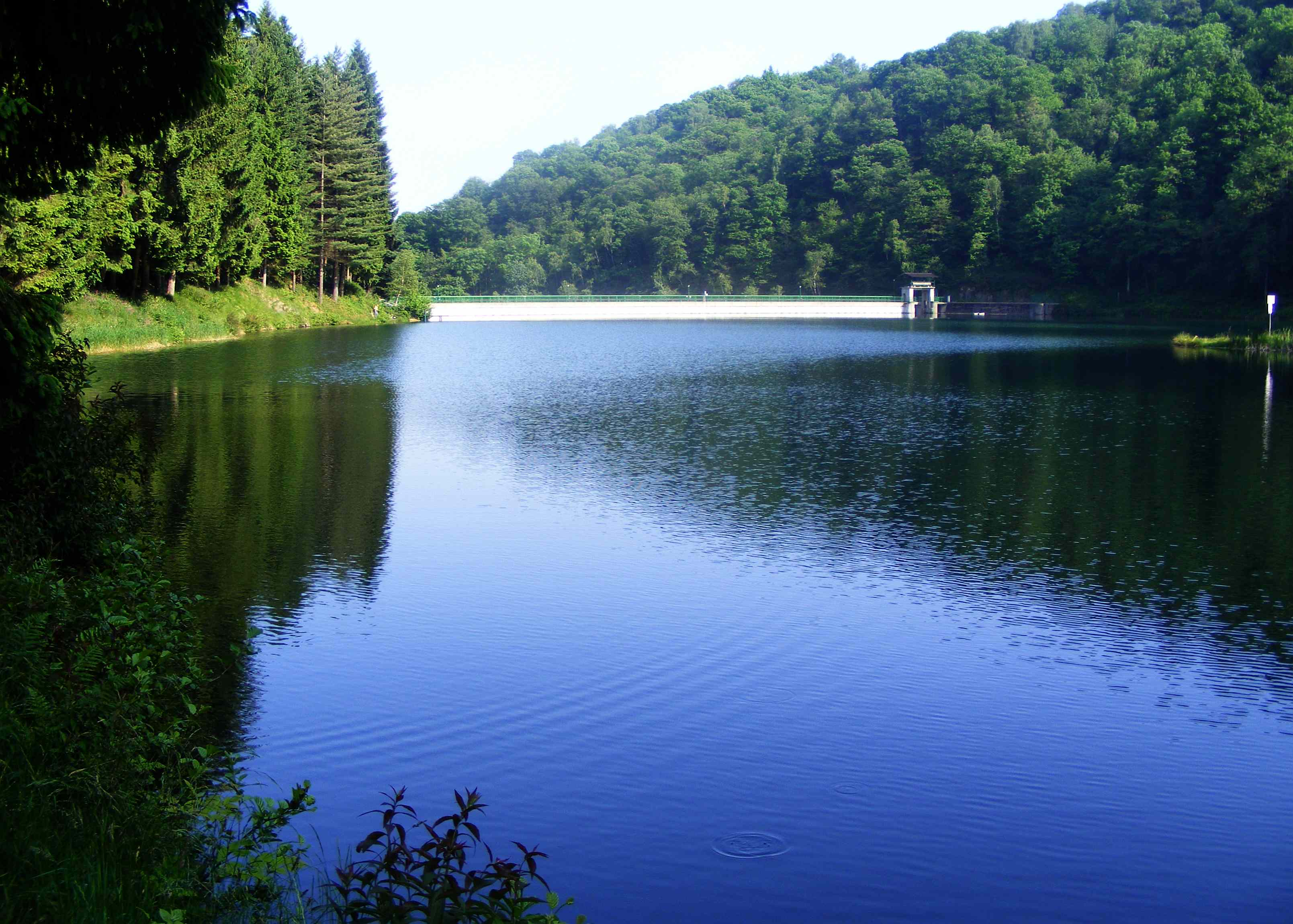

- Location of Lake Ponte Vittorio
- Location: Camandona, Callabiana, Province of Biella, Piedmont, Italy
- Coordinates: 45.6400°N 8.0822°E
- Type: Artificial
- Primary inflows: Strona di Mosso, Rio Barguso, Rio Beran
- Primary outflows: Strona di Mosso
- Max. length: 0.41 km (0.25 mi)
- Max. width: 0.163 km (0.101 mi)
- Surface area: 0.0431 km^{2} (0.0166 sq mi)
- Water volume: 50 hm^{3} (50,000,000 m^{3})
- Shore length^{1}: 1.315 km (0.817 mi)
- Surface elevation: 710 m (2,330 ft)
- Islands: None
- ^{1} Shore length is not a well-defined measure.

The Lake Ponte Vittorio (lach ëd Pont Vitòrio in Piedmontese) is an artificial lake basin located at 710 m elevation between the municipalities of Camandona and Callabiana, both in the Province of Biella.

The capital of the town of Camandona is located 1.5 km northeast of the water body.

== Morphology ==
The Ponte Vittorio dam blocks the Strona di Mosso stream at the confluence with the Rio Beran and the Rio Barguso (or Bergusa).

The resulting lake has a bifurcated shape and, from the dam, extends northwest with two arms that penetrate the small valleys formed by the Rio Barguso and the Strona.

A small road north of the basin allows easy access to the water body.

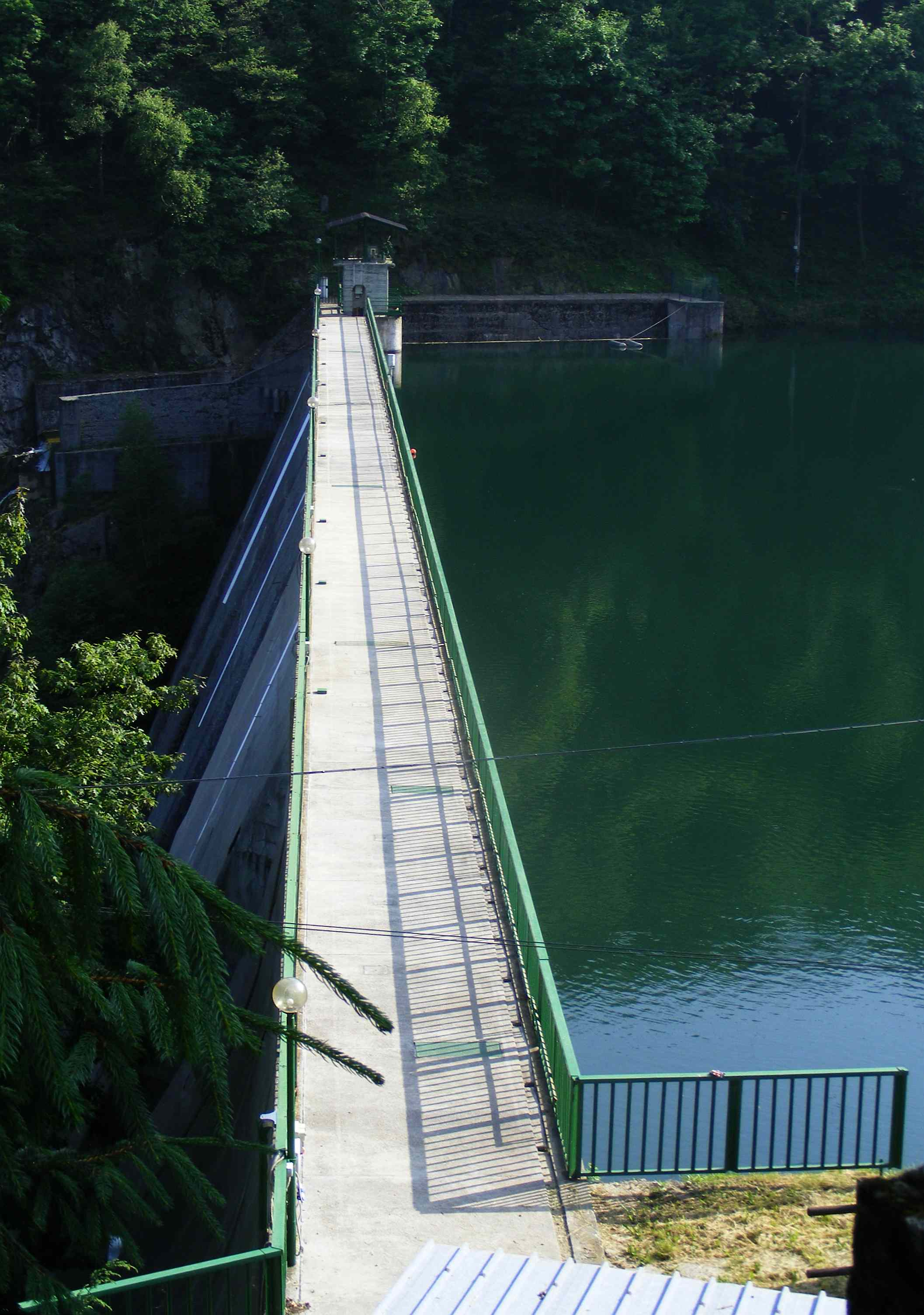
The dam crest seen from the north

== Dam ==
The dam, 33 m high, was built in 1953 to create a reservoir that would regulate the water supply for industrial users located further downstream along the course of the Strona. It is managed by the Società Acquedotto Industriale Vallestrona; in addition to the aforementioned industrial use, the lake's water is also used for drinking water purposes.

In November 1968, when a tragic flood struck the Biellese, causing 12 deaths in Valle Mosso alone, it was rumored that the Ponte Vittorio dam had failed.

However, subsequent inspections completely disproved this rumor, as the dam was found to be perfectly intact.

== Hiking and trail running ==
Just upstream of the lake runs the GtB (Grande Traversata del Biellese), a long hiking itinerary that traverses the entire Province of Biella at mid-low elevation.

In the vicinity of the reservoir, the annual Trail del Monte Casto is also held, organized by the G.S.A. Pollone sports association.

== Fishing ==
The basin contains trout, carp, and chub, but catches are not easy, as the waters are classified as high-quality, and only single-rod fishing without the use of groundbait is permitted.
