= Pettinengo =

- Comune
- Comune di Pettinengo
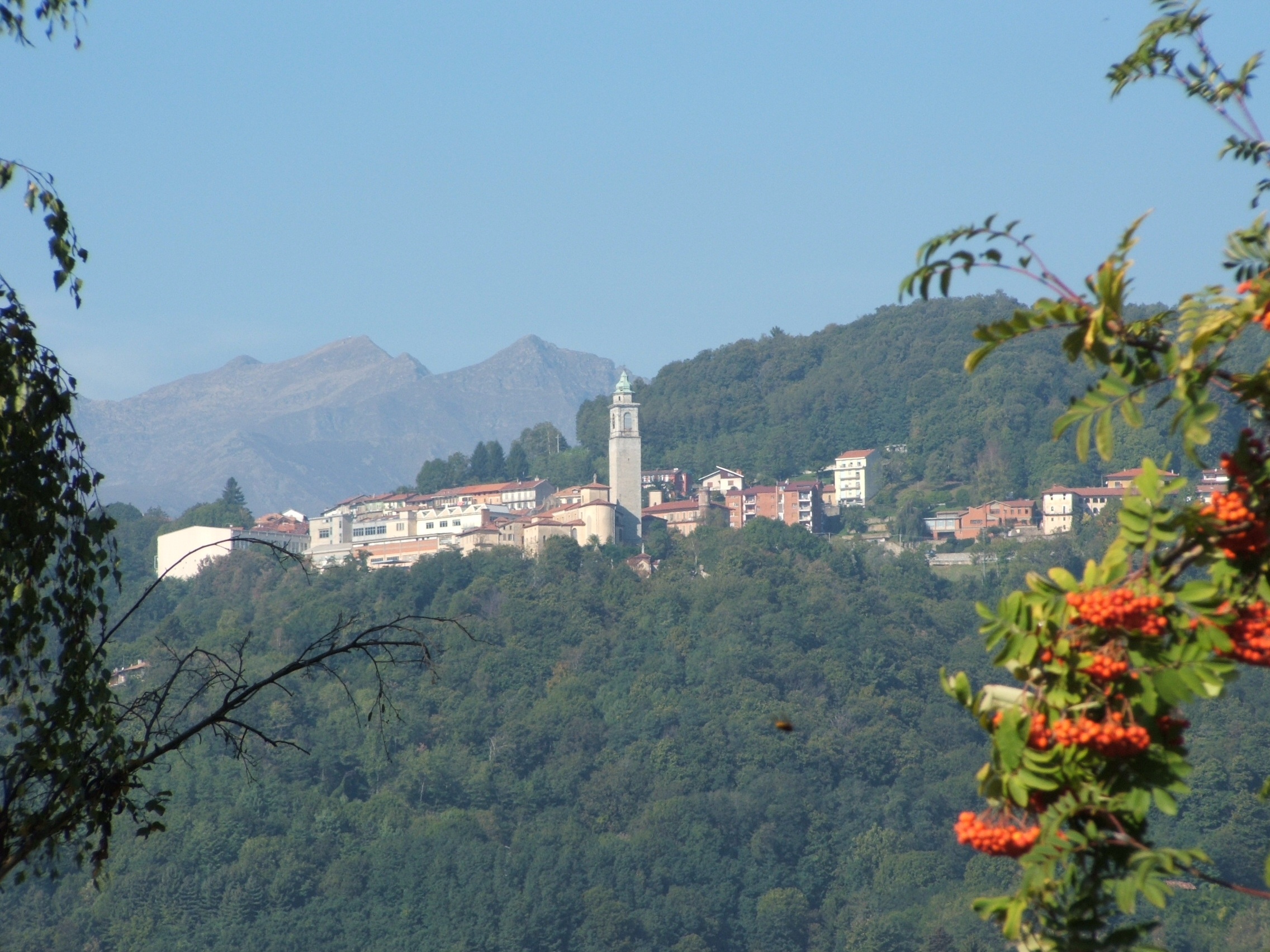
- View of Pettinengo

- Location within Italy Location within Piedmont
- Coordinates: 45°33′N 8°6′E
- Country: Italy
- Region: Piedmont
- Province: Province of Biella (BI)
- Frazioni: Azario, Fassoletto, Gurgo, Livera, Mazza, Miniggio, Molinetto, Perino, Piana, San Francesco, Selva, Trivero, Vaglio, Selve Marcone, Rosa, Burzano, Rossi

Area
  - Total: 11.5 km^{2} (4.4 sq mi)

Population (Dec. 2004)
  - Total: 1,567
  - Density: 136/km^{2} (353/sq mi)
- Time zone: UTC+1 (CET)
  - Summer (DST): UTC+2 (CEST)
- Postal code: 13050
- Dialing code: 015

Pettinengo is a comune (municipality) in the Province of Biella in the Italian region Piedmont, located about 60 kilometres (37 mi) northeast of Turin and about 3 kilometres (2 mi) southeast of Biella. As of 31 December 2004, it had a population of 1,567 and an area of 11.5 square kilometres (4.4 mi^{2}).

Pettinengo borders the following municipalities: Andorno Micca, Biella, Bioglio, Callabiana, Camandona, Piedicavallo, Pila, Piode, Rassa, Ronco Biellese, Scopello, Tavigliano, Ternengo, Valle Mosso, Valle San Nicolao, Veglio, Zumaglia.

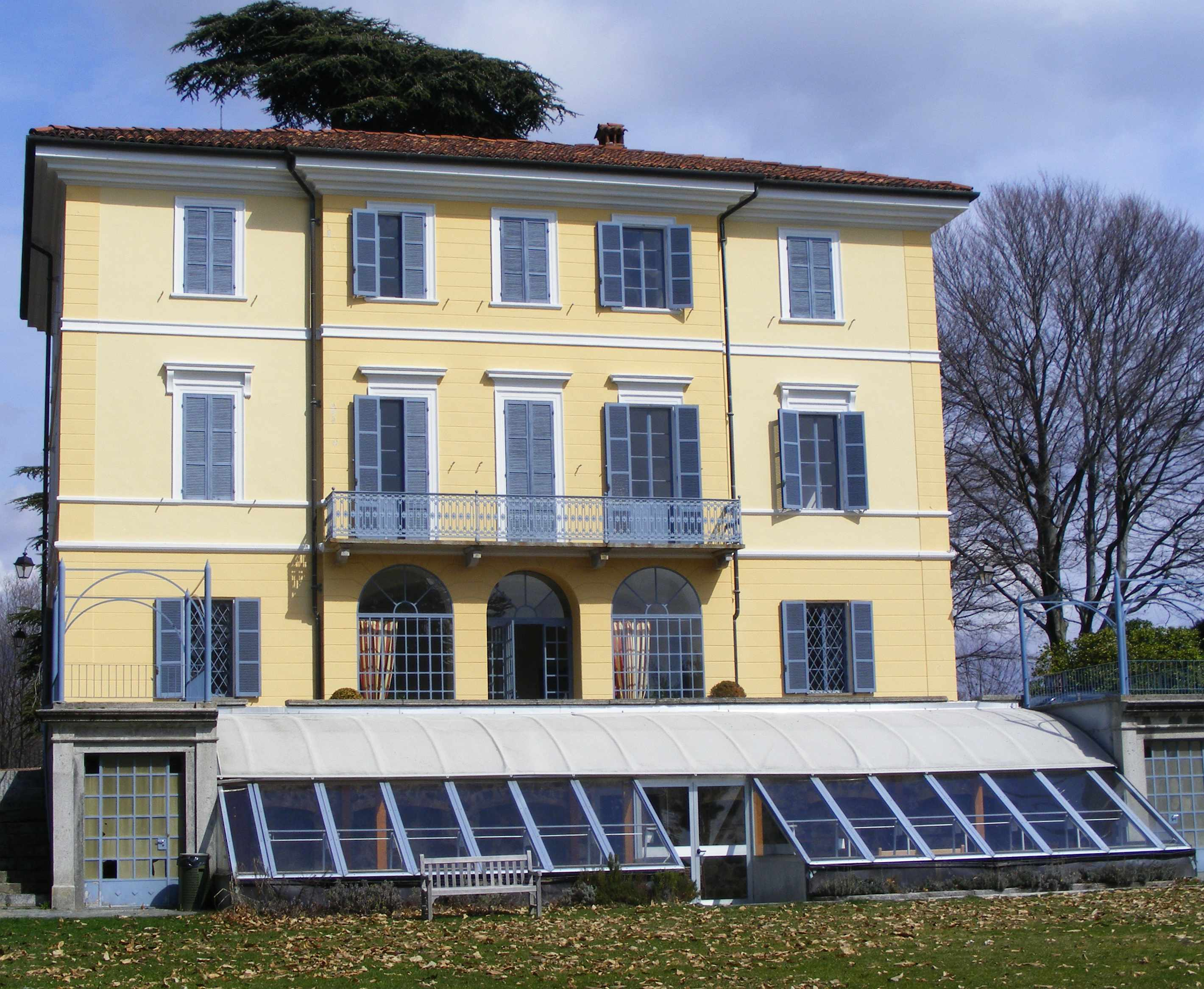
Villa Piazzo

== History ==
From 1 January 2017 Pettinengo absorbed the neighbouring municipality of Selve Marcone.

== Demographic evolution ==
Historical population

Year	Pop.	±%
1861	2,959	—
1871	3,274	+10.6%
1881	3,197	−2.4%
1901	3,044	−4.8%
1911	2,151	−29.3%

Year	Pop.	±%
1921	2,106	−2.1%
1931	1,674	−20.5%
1936	1,656	−1.1%
1951	2,186	+32.0%
1961	2,270	+3.8%

Year	Pop.	±%
1971	2,094	−7.8%
1981	1,869	−10.7%
1991	1,703	−8.9%
2001	1,599	−6.1%

Source: Data from ISTAT
