= Piatto =

- Comune
- Comune di Piatto
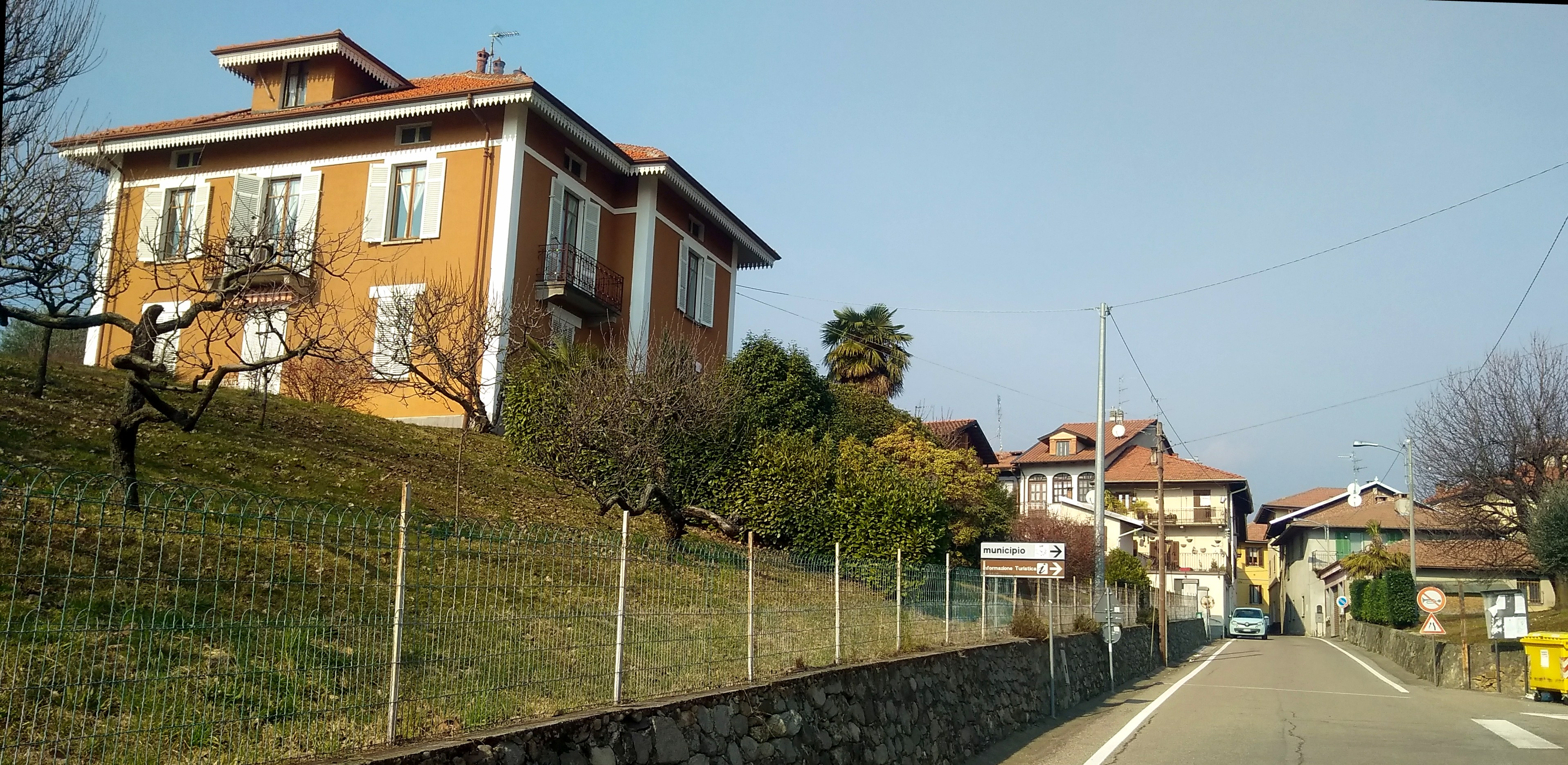
- View of Piatto

- Location within Italy Location within Piedmont
- Coordinates: 45°36′N 8°3′E
- Country: Italy
- Region: Piedmont
- Province: Province of Biella (BI)

Area
  - Total: 3.6 km^{2} (1.4 sq mi)

Population (Dec. 2004)
  - Total: 527
  - Density: 150/km^{2} (380/sq mi)
- Time zone: UTC+1 (CET)
  - Summer (DST): UTC+2 (CEST)
- Postal code: 13050
- Dialing code: 015

Piatto is a comune (municipality) in the Province of Biella in the Italian region Piedmont, located about 70 kilometres (43 mi) northeast of Turin and about 4 kilometres (2 mi) northwest of Biella. On 31 December 2004, it had a population of 527 and an area of 3.6 square kilometres (1.4 mi^{2}).

Piatto borders the municipalities of Bioglio, Callabiana, Camandona, Mosso, Quaregna, Ternengo, Valdengo, Vallanzengo, Valle San Nicolao and Veglio.

== Demographic evolution ==
Historical population

Year	Pop.	±%
1861	567	—
1871	684	+20.6%
1881	658	−3.8%
1901	716	+8.8%
1911	600	−16.2%
1921	561	−6.5%

Year	Pop.	±%
1931	523	−6.8%
1936	504	−3.6%
1951	555	+10.1%
1961	538	−3.1%
1971	505	−6.1%
1981	525	+4.0%

Year	Pop.	±%
1991	507	−3.4%
2001	552	+8.9%
2011	547	−0.9%
2021	478	−12.6%

Source: Data from ISTAT
