= Bioglio =

- Comune
- Comune di Bioglio
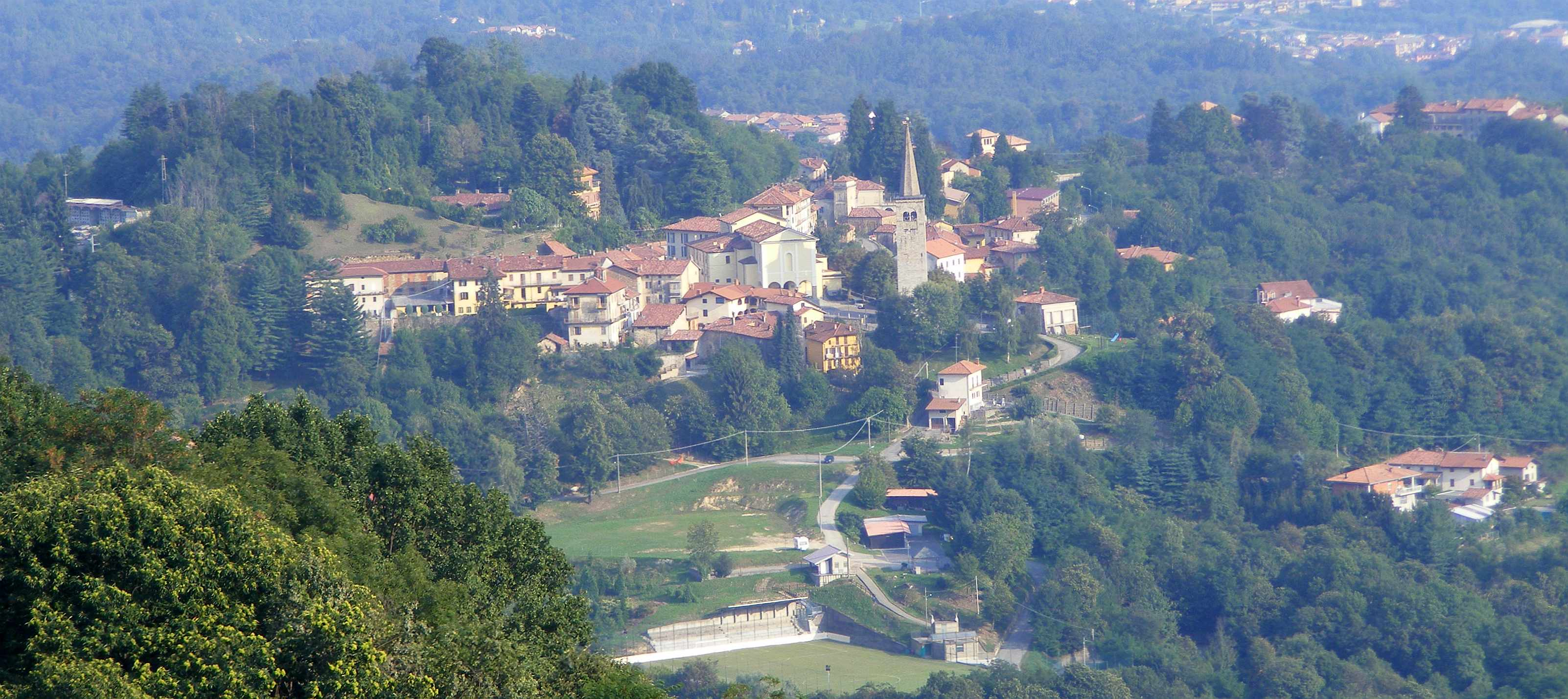
- Bioglio seen from Pettinengo

- Location within Italy Location within Piedmont
- Coordinates: 45°38′N 8°8′E
- Country: Italy
- Region: Piedmont
- Province: Province of Biella (BI)

Area
  - Total: 17.8 km^{2} (6.9 sq mi)

Population (Dec. 2004)
  - Total: 875
  - Density: 49.2/km^{2} (127/sq mi)
- Time zone: UTC+1 (CET)
  - Summer (DST): UTC+2 (CEST)
- Postal code: 13050
- Dialing code: 015

Bioglio is a comune (municipality) in the Province of Biella in the Italian region Piedmont, located about 90 kilometres (56 mi) northeast of Turin and about 9 kilometres (6 mi) northeast of Biella. As of 31 December 2004, it had a population of 1,049 and an area of 17.8 square kilometres (6.9 mi^{2}).

Bioglio borders the following municipalities: Callabiana, Camandona, Mosso, Pettinengo, Piatto, Piedicavallo, Tavigliano, Ternengo, Vallanzengo, Valle Mosso, Valle San Nicolao, Veglio.

== Notable natives ==
- Antonio Benedetto Carpano
- Umberto Maglioli
