= Miagliano =

- Comune
- Comune di Miagliano
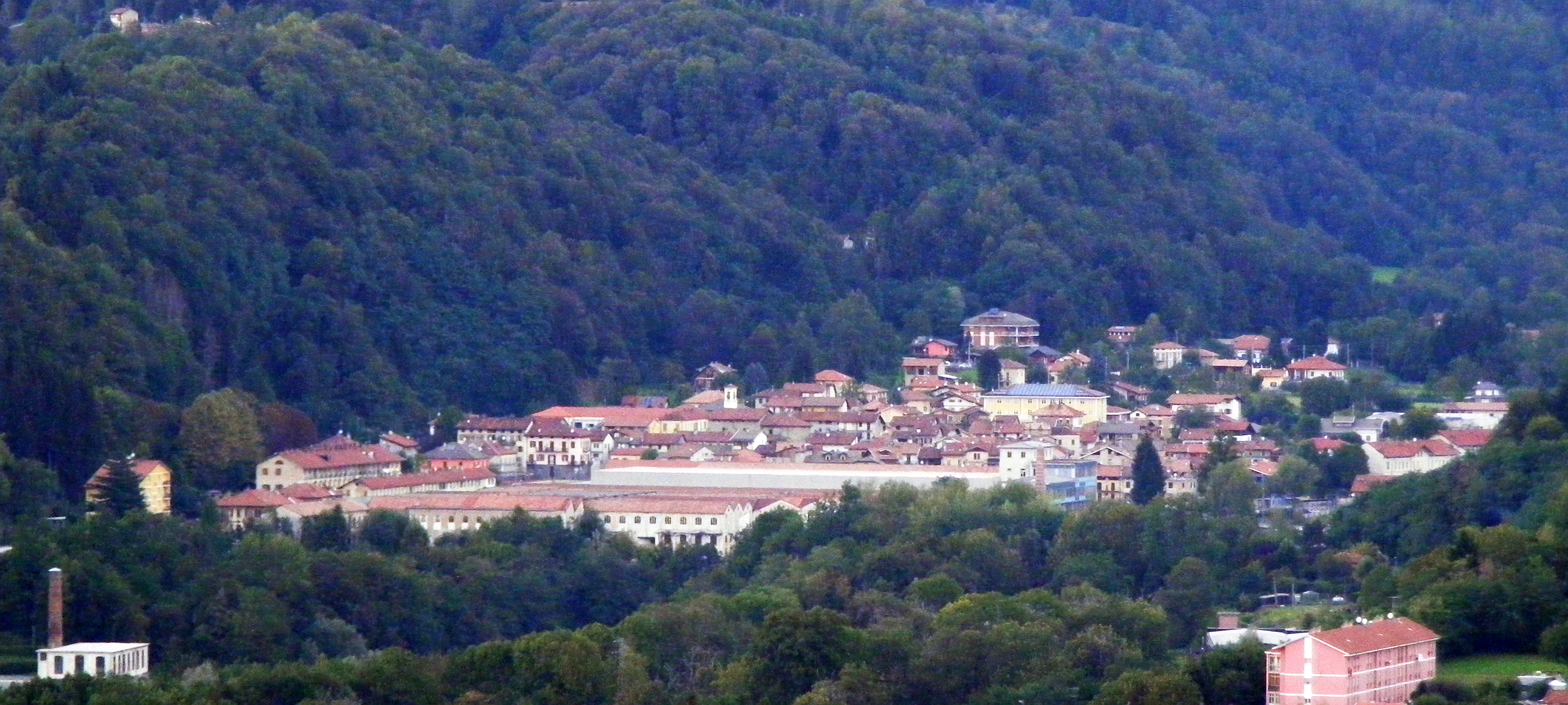
- View of Miagliano

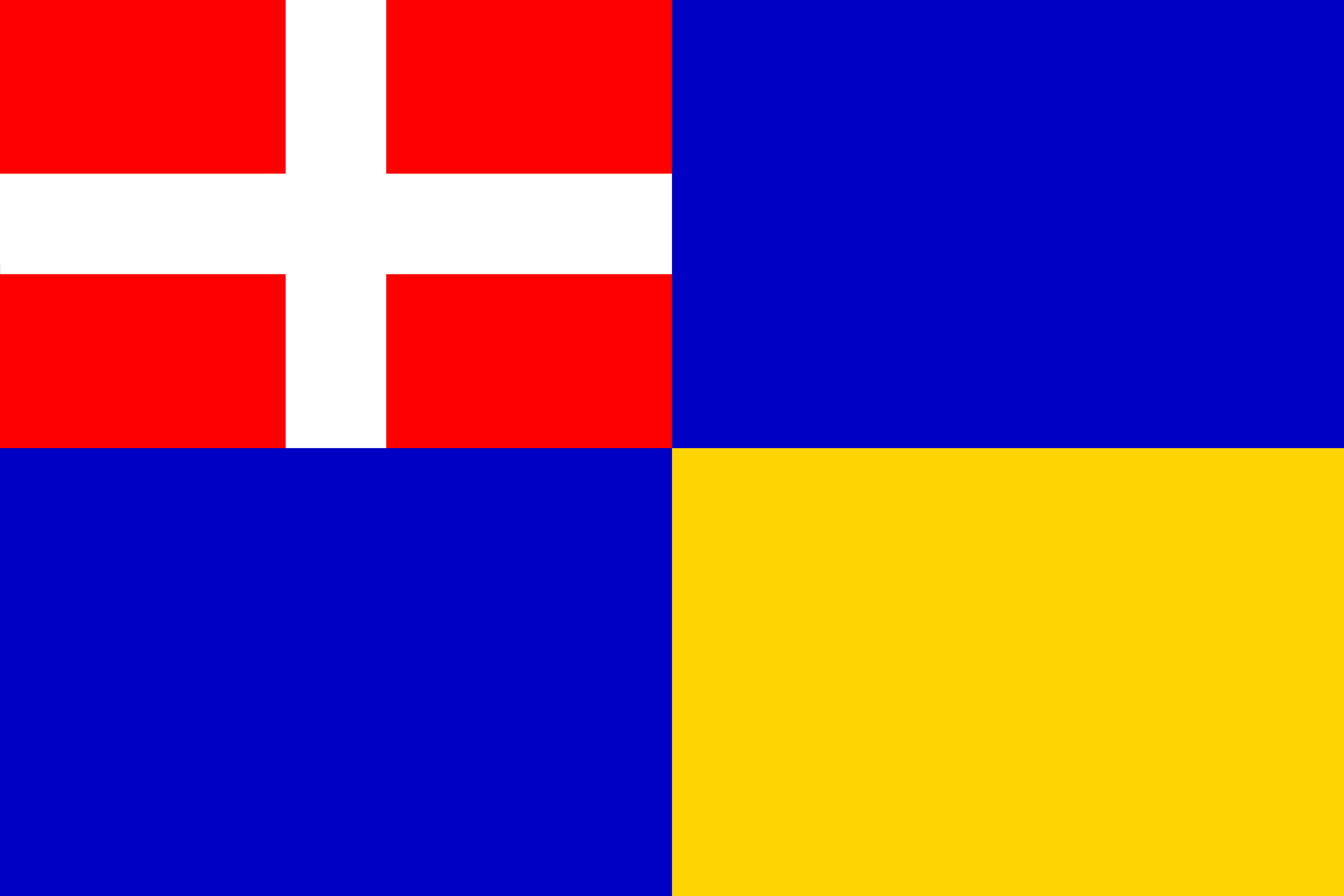
- Flag

- Location within Italy Location within Piedmont
- Coordinates: 45°36′N 8°5′E
- Country: Italy
- Region: Piedmont
- Province: Province of Biella (BI)

Area
  - Total: 0.7 km^{2} (0.27 sq mi)

Population (Dec. 2004)
  - Total: 631
  - Density: 900/km^{2} (2,300/sq mi)
- Time zone: UTC+1 (CET)
  - Summer (DST): UTC+2 (CEST)
- Postal code: 13060
- Dialing code: 015

Miagliano is a comune (municipality) in the Province of Biella in the Italian region Piedmont, located about 70 kilometres (43 mi) northeast of Turin and about 4 kilometres (2 mi) northeast of Biella. As of 31 December 2004, it had a population of 631 and an area of 0.7 square kilometres (0.27 mi^{2}).

Miagliano borders the following municipalities: Andorno Micca, Sagliano Micca.

== Demographic evolution ==
Historical population

Year	Pop.	±%
1861	332	—
1871	422	+27.1%
1881	771	+82.7%
1901	1,328	+72.2%
1911	1,384	+4.2%

Year	Pop.	±%
1921	1,306	−5.6%
1931	1,382	+5.8%
1936	1,229	−11.1%
1951	1,291	+5.0%
1961	1,062	−17.7%

Year	Pop.	±%
1971	885	−16.7%
1981	705	−20.3%
1991	624	−11.5%
2001	592	−5.1%

Source: Data from ISTAT
