= Tavigliano =

- Comune
- Comune di Tavigliano
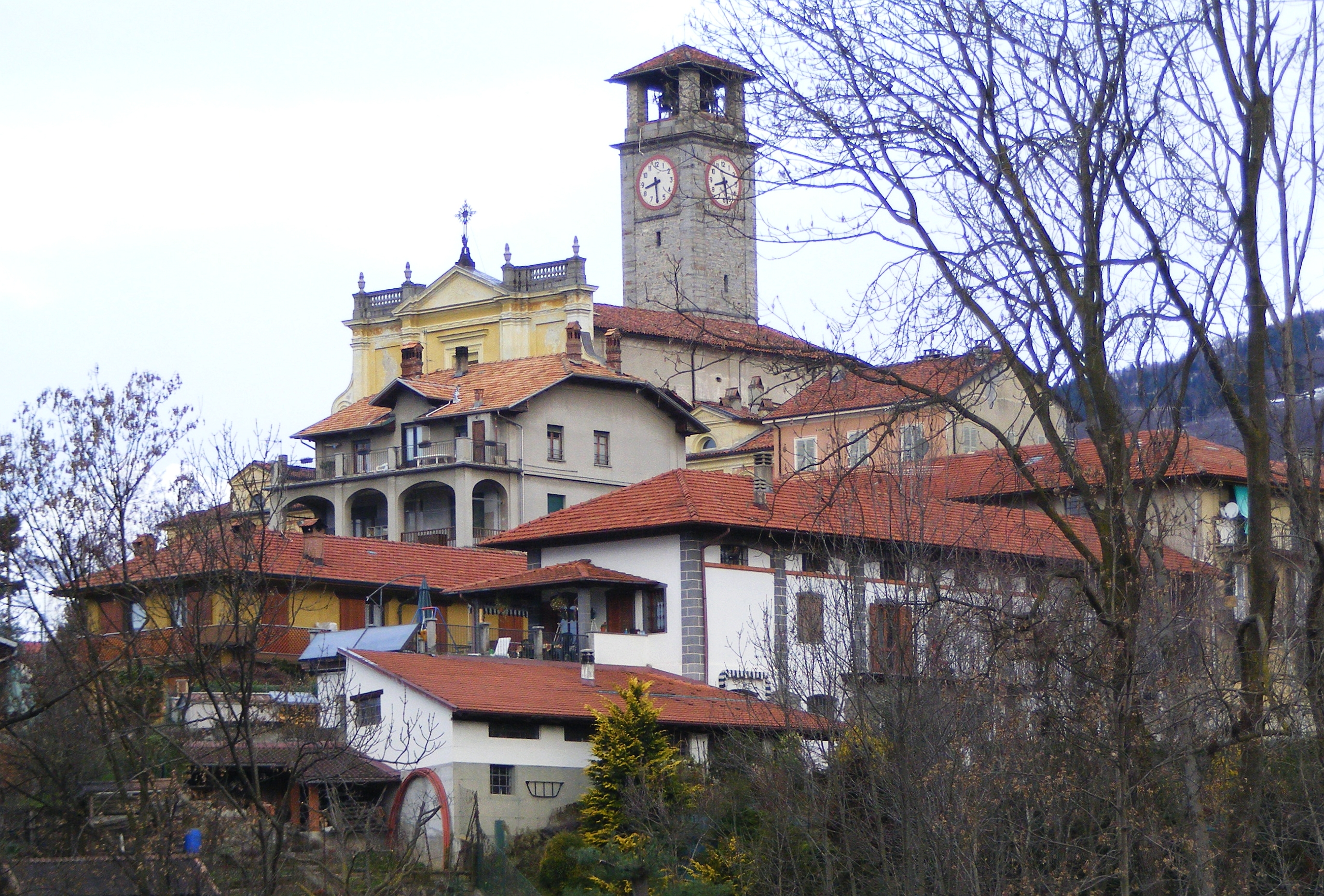
- View of Tavigliano

- Location within Italy Location within Piedmont
- Coordinates: 45°37′N 8°3′E
- Country: Italy
- Region: Piedmont
- Province: Province of Biella (BI)
- Frazioni: Pratetto, Vincio, Causso, Orecchia and Sella

Area
  - Total: 10.9 km^{2} (4.2 sq mi)
- Elevation: 659 m (2,162 ft)

Population (Dec. 2004)
  - Total: 953
  - Density: 87.4/km^{2} (226/sq mi)
- Time zone: UTC+1 (CET)
  - Summer (DST): UTC+2 (CEST)
- Postal code: 13060
- Dialing code: 015

Tavigliano is a comune (municipality) in the Province of Biella in the Italian region Piedmont, located about 70 kilometres (43 mi) northeast of Turin and about 6 kilometres (4 mi) north of Biella. As of 31 December 2004, it had a population of 953 and an area of 10.9 square kilometres (4.2 mi^{2}).

Tavigliano borders the following municipalities: Andorno Micca, Bioglio, Callabiana, Pettinengo, Piedicavallo, Rassa, Sagliano Micca, Veglio.

== Demographic evolution ==
Historical population

Year	Pop.	±%
1861	1,352	—
1871	1,493	+10.4%
1881	1,672	+12.0%
1901	1,719	+2.8%
1911	1,582	−8.0%

Year	Pop.	±%
1921	1,437	−9.2%
1931	1,272	−11.5%
1936	1,206	−5.2%
1951	1,212	+0.5%
1961	1,170	−3.5%

Year	Pop.	±%
1971	917	−21.6%
1981	893	−2.6%
1991	861	−3.6%
2001	936	+8.7%

Source: Data from ISTAT
