= Ternengo =

- Comune
- Comune di Ternengo
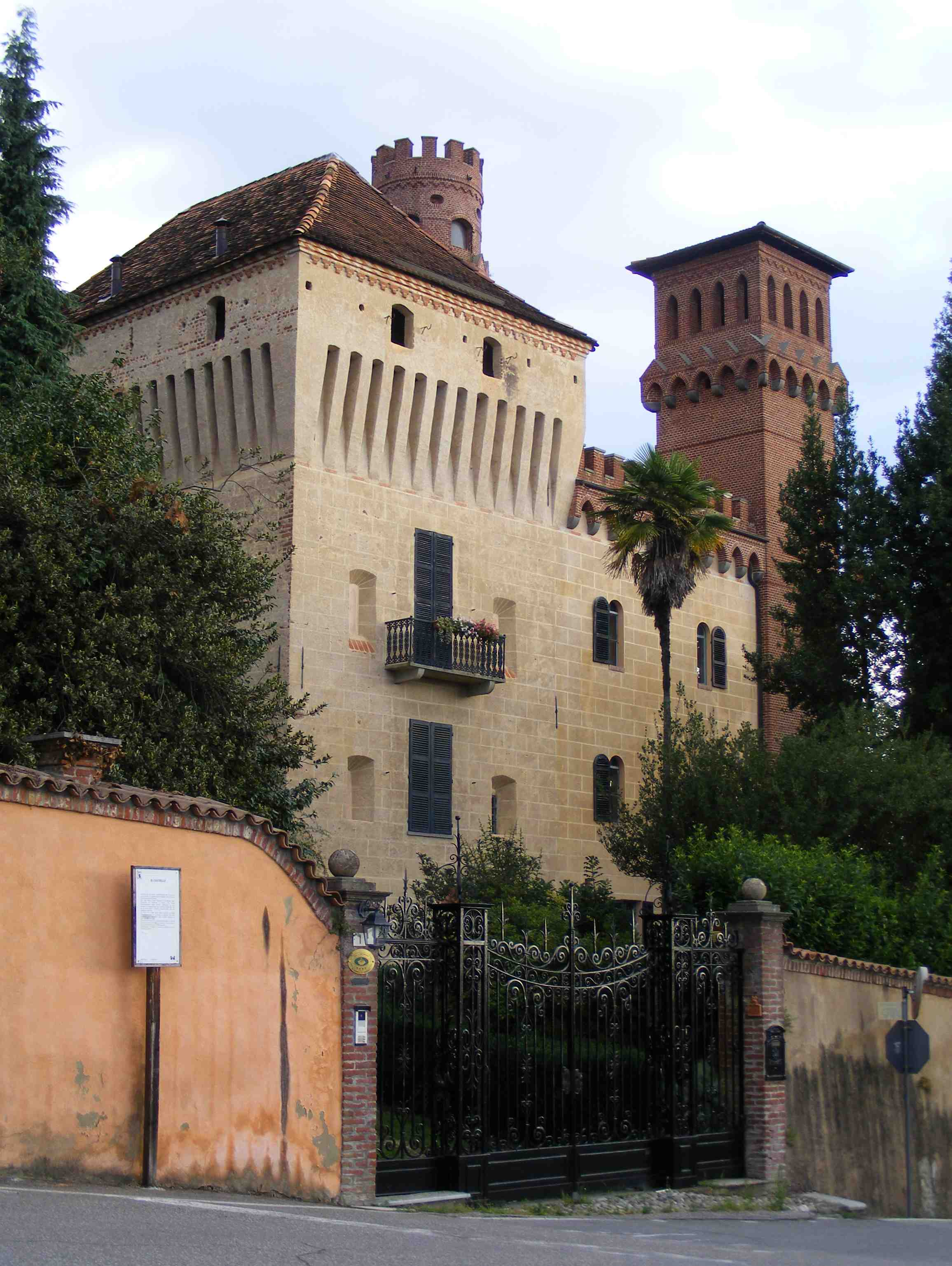
- View of Ternengo

- Location within Italy Location within Piedmont
- Coordinates: 45°33′N 8°6′E
- Country: Italy
- Region: Piedmont
- Province: Province of Biella (BI)

Area
  - Total: 2.0 km^{2} (0.77 sq mi)
- Elevation: 429 m (1,407 ft)

Population (Dec. 2004)
  - Total: 310
  - Density: 150/km^{2} (400/sq mi)
- Time zone: UTC+1 (CET)
  - Summer (DST): UTC+2 (CEST)
- Postal code: 13050
- Dialing code: 015

Ternengo is a comune (municipality) in the Province of Biella in the Italian region Piedmont, located about 60 kilometres (37 mi) northeast of Turin and about 3 kilometres (2 mi) southeast of Biella. As of 31 December 2004, it had a population of 310 and an area of 2.0 square kilometres (0.77 mi^{2}).

Ternengo borders the following municipalities: Bioglio, Pettinengo, Piatto, Ronco Biellese, Valdengo.

== Demographic evolution ==
Historical population

Year	Pop.	±%
1861	531	—
1871	562	+5.8%
1881	552	−1.8%
1901	460	−16.7%
1911	415	−9.8%

Year	Pop.	±%
1921	372	−10.4%
1931	328	−11.8%
1936	325	−0.9%
1951	381	+17.2%
1961	394	+3.4%

Year	Pop.	±%
1971	262	−33.5%
1981	252	−3.8%
1991	320	+27.0%
2001	307	−4.1%

Source: Data from ISTAT
