= Valle San Nicolao =

- Comune
- Comune di Valle San Nicolao
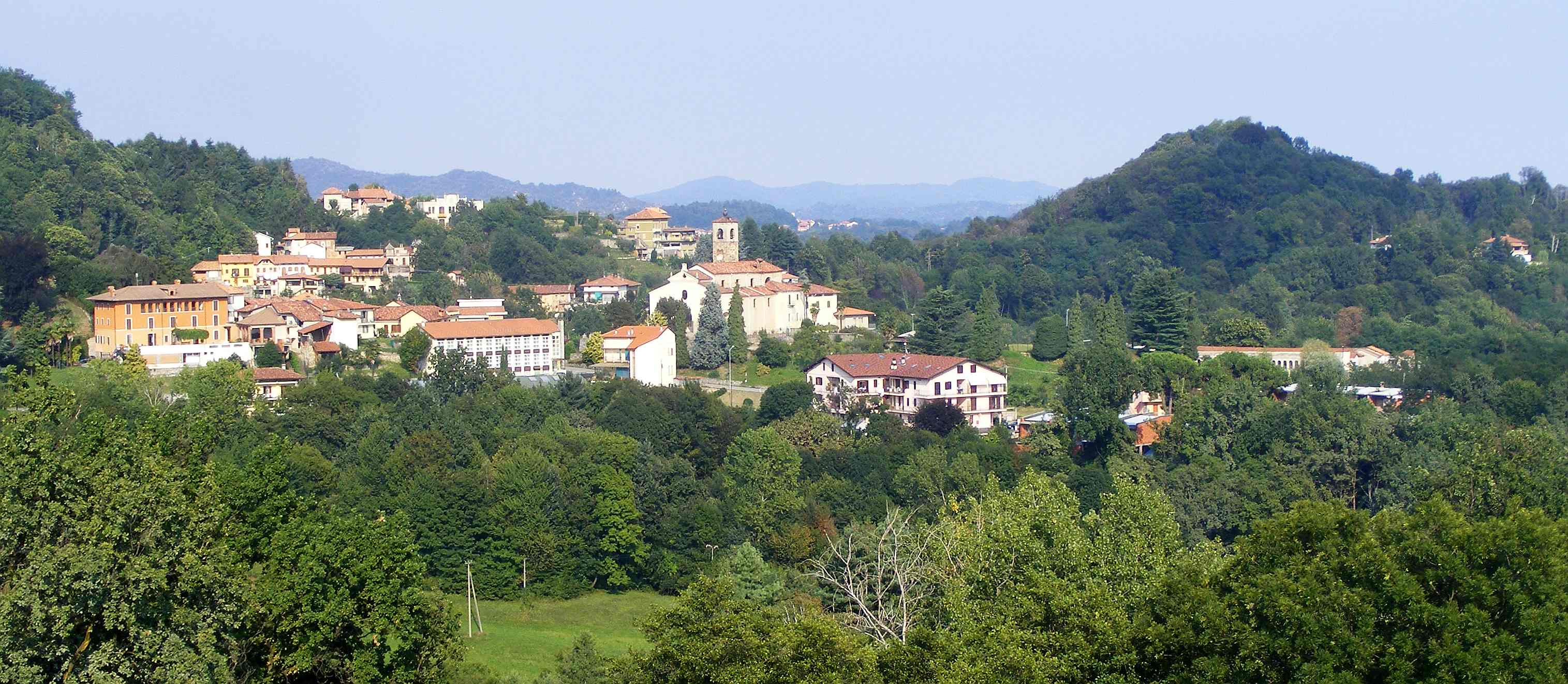
- View of Valle San Nicolao

- Location within Italy Location within Piedmont
- Coordinates: 45°36′N 8°8′E
- Country: Italy
- Region: Piedmont
- Province: Province of Biella (BI)
- Frazioni: Allasa, Bassoleje, Berchelle, Bertina, Bertola, Colongo, Delia, Ferrere, Foscallo, Gallotto, Gaudino, Groppo, Miola, Molino Filippo, Mombello, Murazze, Pizzoglio, Polto Inferiore, Polto Superiore, Strona, Stupenengo

Area
  - Total: 14.9 km^{2} (5.8 sq mi)

Population (Dec. 2004)
  - Total: 1,136
  - Density: 76.2/km^{2} (197/sq mi)
- Time zone: UTC+1 (CET)
  - Summer (DST): UTC+2 (CEST)
- Postal code: 13050
- Dialing code: 015

Valle San Nicolao is a comune (municipality) in the Province of Biella in the Italian region Piedmont, located about 70 kilometres (43 mi) northeast of Turin and about 6 kilometres (4 mi) northeast of Biella. As of 31 December 2004, it had a population of 1,136 and an area of 14.9 square kilometres (5.8 mi^{2}).

Valle San Nicolao borders the following municipalities: Bioglio, Camandona, Cossato, Pettinengo, Piatto, Piedicavallo, Quaregna, Scopello, Strona, Trivero, Vallanzengo, Valle Mosso.

== Demographic evolution ==
Historical population

Year	Pop.	±%
1861	1,248	—
1871	1,413	+13.2%
1881	1,618	+14.5%
1901	1,868	+15.5%
1911	1,636	−12.4%

Year	Pop.	±%
1921	1,574	−3.8%
1931	1,716	+9.0%
1936	1,822	+6.2%
1951	1,959	+7.5%
1961	1,867	−4.7%

Year	Pop.	±%
1971	1,474	−21.0%
1981	1,259	−14.6%
1991	1,206	−4.2%
2001	1,141	−5.4%

Source: Data from ISTAT
