= Veglio =

- Comune
- Comune di Veglio
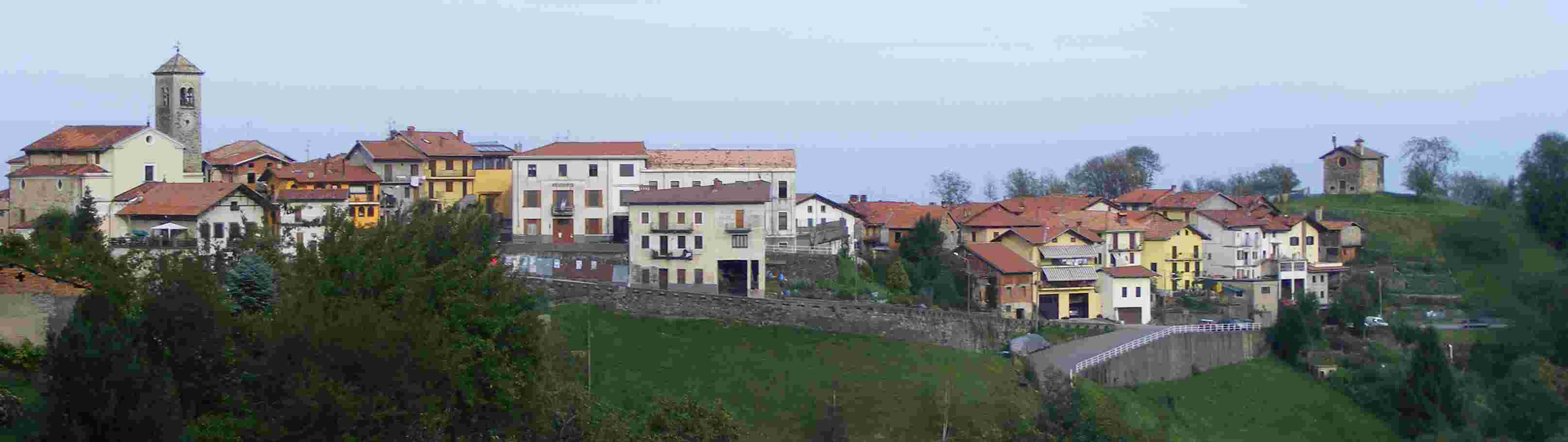
- View of Veglio

- Location within Italy Location within Piedmont
- Coordinates: 45°38′N 8°7′E
- Country: Italy
- Region: Piedmont
- Province: Province of Biella (BI)

Area
  - Total: 6.8 km^{2} (2.6 sq mi)

Population (Dec. 2004)
  - Total: 643
  - Density: 95/km^{2} (240/sq mi)
- Time zone: UTC+1 (CET)
  - Summer (DST): UTC+2 (CEST)
- Postal code: 13050
- Dialing code: 015

Veglio is a comune (municipality) in the province of Biella in the Italian region Piedmont, located about 70 kilometres (43 mi) northeast of Turin and about 8 kilometres (5 mi) northeast of Biella. As of 31 December 2004, it had a population of 643 and an area of 6.8 square kilometres (2.6 mi^{2}).

Veglio borders the following municipalities: Bioglio, Camandona, Mosso, Pettinengo, Piatto, Quittengo, Sagliano Micca, Tavigliano, Valle Mosso.

== Demographic evolution ==
Historical population

Year	Pop.	±%
1861	1,030	—
1871	1,128	+9.5%
1881	1,234	+9.4%
1901	1,319	+6.9%
1911	1,253	−5.0%
1921	972	−22.4%

Year	Pop.	±%
1931	953	−2.0%
1936	983	+3.1%
1951	1,124	+14.3%
1961	1,146	+2.0%
1971	843	−26.4%
1981	762	−9.6%

Year	Pop.	±%
1991	706	−7.3%
2001	660	−6.5%
2011	566	−14.2%
2021	454	−19.8%

Source: Data from ISTAT
