= Rosazza =

- Comune
- Comune di Rosazza
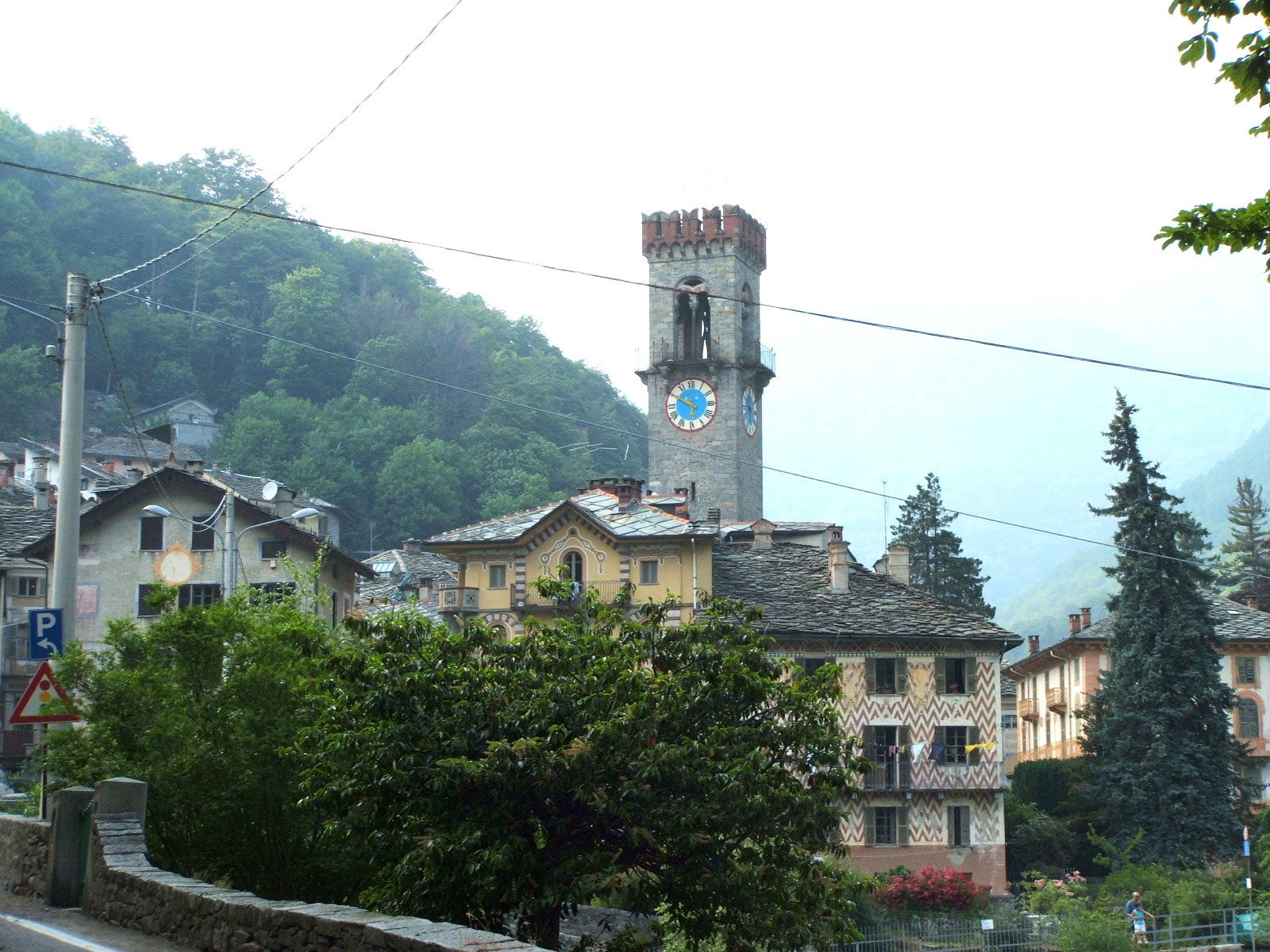
- View of Rosazza

- Location within Italy Location within Piedmont
- Coordinates: 45°40′N 7°58′E
- Country: Italy
- Region: Piedmont
- Province: Province of Biella (BI)

Area
  - Total: 8.7 km^{2} (3.4 sq mi)

Population (Dec. 2004)
  - Total: 89
  - Density: 10/km^{2} (26/sq mi)
- Time zone: UTC+1 (CET)
  - Summer (DST): UTC+2 (CEST)
- Postal code: 13060
- Dialing code: 015
- Website: Official website

Rosazza is a comune (municipality) in the Province of Biella in the Italian region Piedmont, located about 70 kilometres (43 mi) northeast of Turin and about 15 kilometres (9 mi) northwest of Biella. As of 31 December 2004, it had a population of 89 and an area of 8.7 square kilometres (3.4 mi^{2}).

Rosazza borders the following municipalities: Andorno Micca, Campiglia Cervo, Piedicavallo, Sagliano Micca. It is one of I Borghi più belli d'Italia ("The most beautiful villages of Italy").

== Demographic evolution ==
Historical population

Year	Pop.	±%
1861	1,301	—
1871	1,223	−6.0%
1881	1,339	+9.5%
1901	1,036	−22.6%
1911	985	−4.9%

Year	Pop.	±%
1921	810	−17.8%
1931	704	−13.1%
1936	461	−34.5%
1951	362	−21.5%
1961	322	−11.0%

Year	Pop.	±%
1971	219	−32.0%
1981	141	−35.6%
1991	118	−16.3%
2001	89	−24.6%

Source: Data from ISTAT
