= Sagliano Micca =

- Comune
- Comune di Sagliano Micca
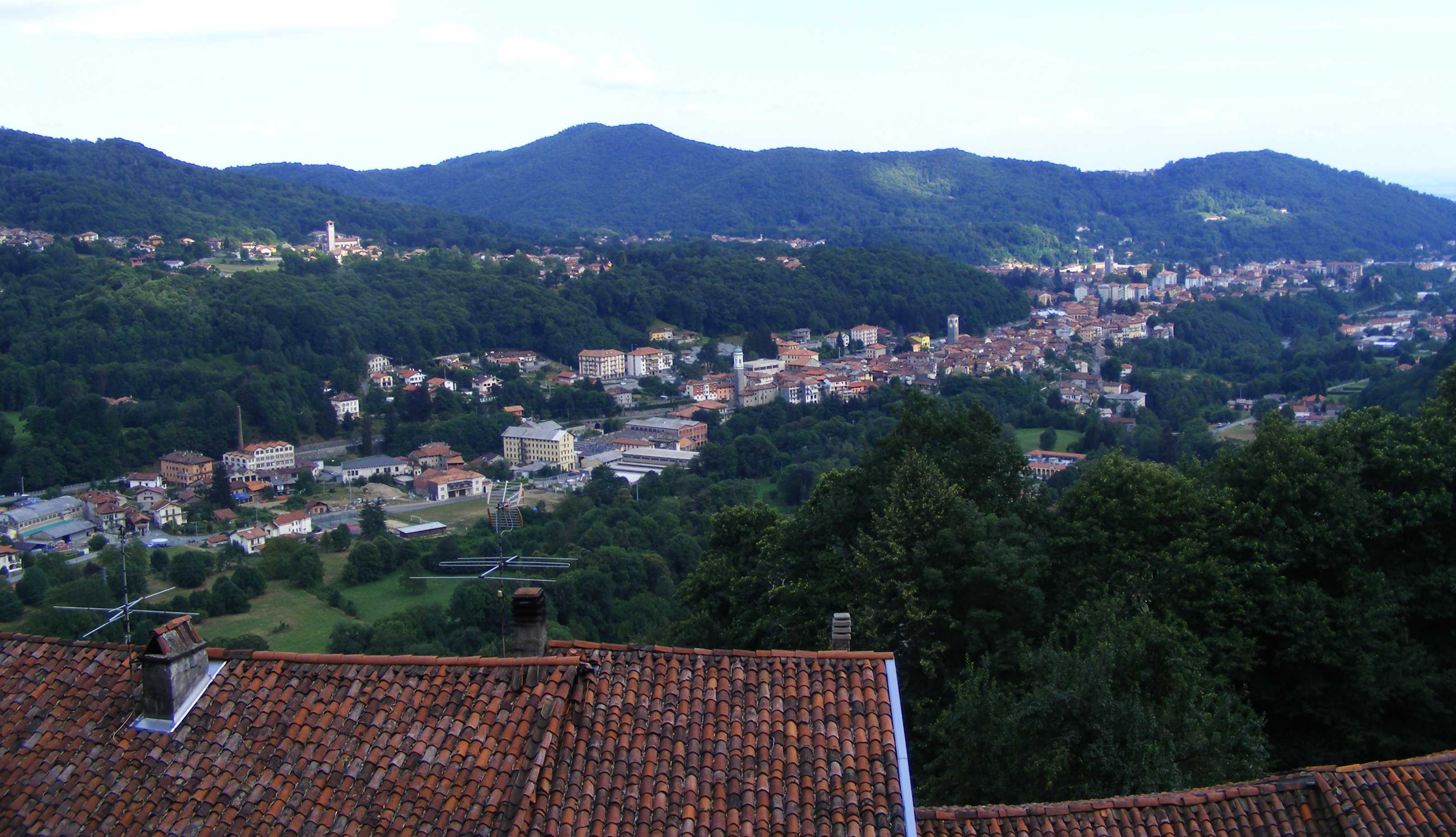
- View of Sagliano Micca

- Coat of arms

- Location within Italy Location within Piedmont
- Coordinates: 45°37′N 8°3′E
- Country: Italy
- Region: Piedmont
- Province: Province of Biella (BI)
- Frazioni: Casale, Passobreve, Oneglie, Falletti, Code Inferiore, Code Superiore

Government
  - Mayor: Patrick Forgnone

Area
  - Total: 14.9 km^{2} (5.8 sq mi)
- Elevation: 589 m (1,932 ft)

Population (31 December 2010)
  - Total: 1,679
  - Density: 113/km^{2} (292/sq mi)
- Demonym: Saglianesi
- Time zone: UTC+1 (CET)
  - Summer (DST): UTC+2 (CEST)
- Postal code: 13065
- Dialing code: 015

Sagliano Micca is a comune (municipality) in the Province of Biella in the Italian region Piedmont, located about 70 kilometres (43 mi) northeast of Turin and about 6 kilometres (4 mi) north of Biella.

Sagliano Micca borders the following municipalities: Andorno Micca, Biella, Fontainemore, Gaby, Issime, Miagliano, Piedicavallo, Pralungo, Quittengo, Rosazza, San Paolo Cervo, Tavigliano, Tollegno, Veglio.

Once known only as Sagliano, the city changed name to honour its most famous citizen, Pietro Micca, a hero of the siege of Turin in 1706.

Sagliano Micca is the home of Cappellificio Cervo, distinguished makers of fedora hats.

== Twin towns – sister cities ==
Sagliano Micca is twinned with:

- Minervino Murge, Italy (2009)
