= Vallanzengo =

- Comune
- Comune di Vallanzengo
- Location within Italy Location within Piedmont
- Coordinates: 45°36′N 8°3′E
- Country: Italy
- Region: Piedmont
- Province: Province of Biella (BI)

Area
  - Total: 3.9 km^{2} (1.5 sq mi)

Population (Dec. 2004)
  - Total: 236
  - Density: 61/km^{2} (160/sq mi)
- Time zone: UTC+1 (CET)
  - Summer (DST): UTC+2 (CEST)
- Postal code: 13847
- Dialing code: 015

Vallanzengo is a comune (municipality) in the Province of Biella in the Italian region Piedmont, located about 70 kilometres (43 mi) northeast of Turin and about 4 kilometres (2 mi) northwest of Biella. As of 31 December 2004, it had a population of 236 and an area of 3.9 square kilometres (1.5 mi^{2}).

Vallanzengo borders the following municipalities: Bioglio, Callabiana, Camandona, Mosso, Piatto, Quaregna, Trivero, Valle Mosso, Valle San Nicolao.

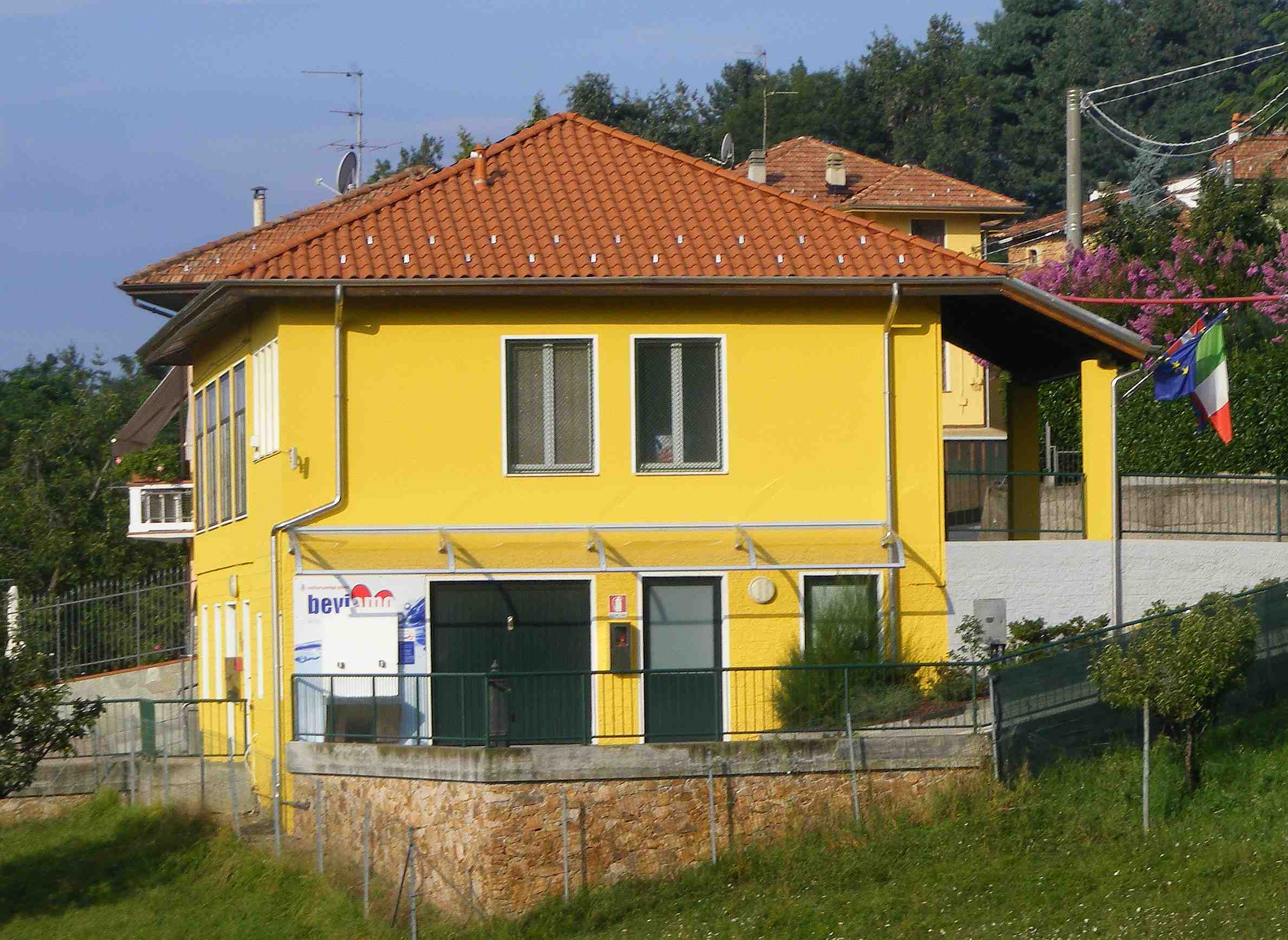
Vallanzengo town hall, BI, Italy.

== Demographic evolution ==
Historical population

Year	Pop.	±%
1861	294	—
1871	331	+12.6%
1881	384	+16.0%
1901	435	+13.3%
1911	421	−3.2%

Year	Pop.	±%
1921	380	−9.7%
1931	354	−6.8%
1936	347	−2.0%
1951	384	+10.7%
1961	342	−10.9%

Year	Pop.	±%
1971	279	−18.4%
1981	272	−2.5%
1991	262	−3.7%
2001	250	−4.6%

Source: Data from ISTAT
