= Piedicavallo =

- Comune
- Comune di Piedicavallo
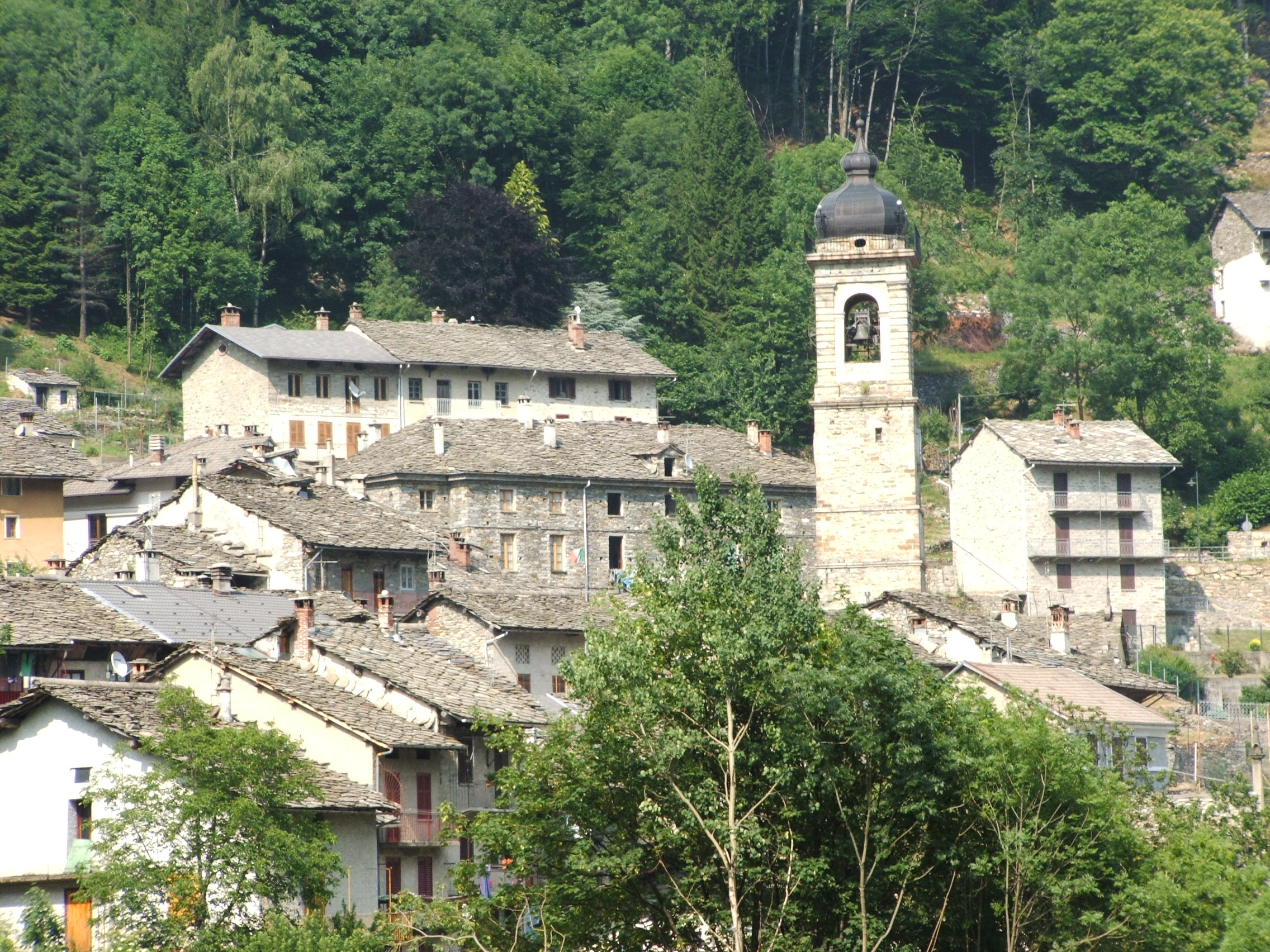
- View of Piedicavallo

- Location within Italy Location within Piedmont
- Coordinates: 45°42′N 7°57′E
- Country: Italy
- Region: Piedmont
- Province: Province of Biella (BI)
- Frazioni: Montesinaro

Area
  - Total: 17.8 km^{2} (6.9 sq mi)

Population (Dec. 2004)
  - Total: 189
  - Density: 10.6/km^{2} (27.5/sq mi)
- Time zone: UTC+1 (CET)
  - Summer (DST): UTC+2 (CEST)
- Postal code: 13060
- Dialing code: 015

Piedicavallo is a comune (municipality) in the Province of Biella in the Italian region Piedmont, located about 70 kilometres (43 mi) northeast of Turin and about 15 kilometres (9 mi) northwest of Biella. As of 31 December 2004, it had a population of 189 and an area of 17.8 square kilometres (6.9 mi^{2}).

Piedicavallo borders the following municipalities: Andorno Micca, Bioglio, Callabiana, Campiglia Cervo, Gaby, Pettinengo, Rosazza, Sagliano Micca, Tavigliano, Valle Mosso, Valle San Nicolao.

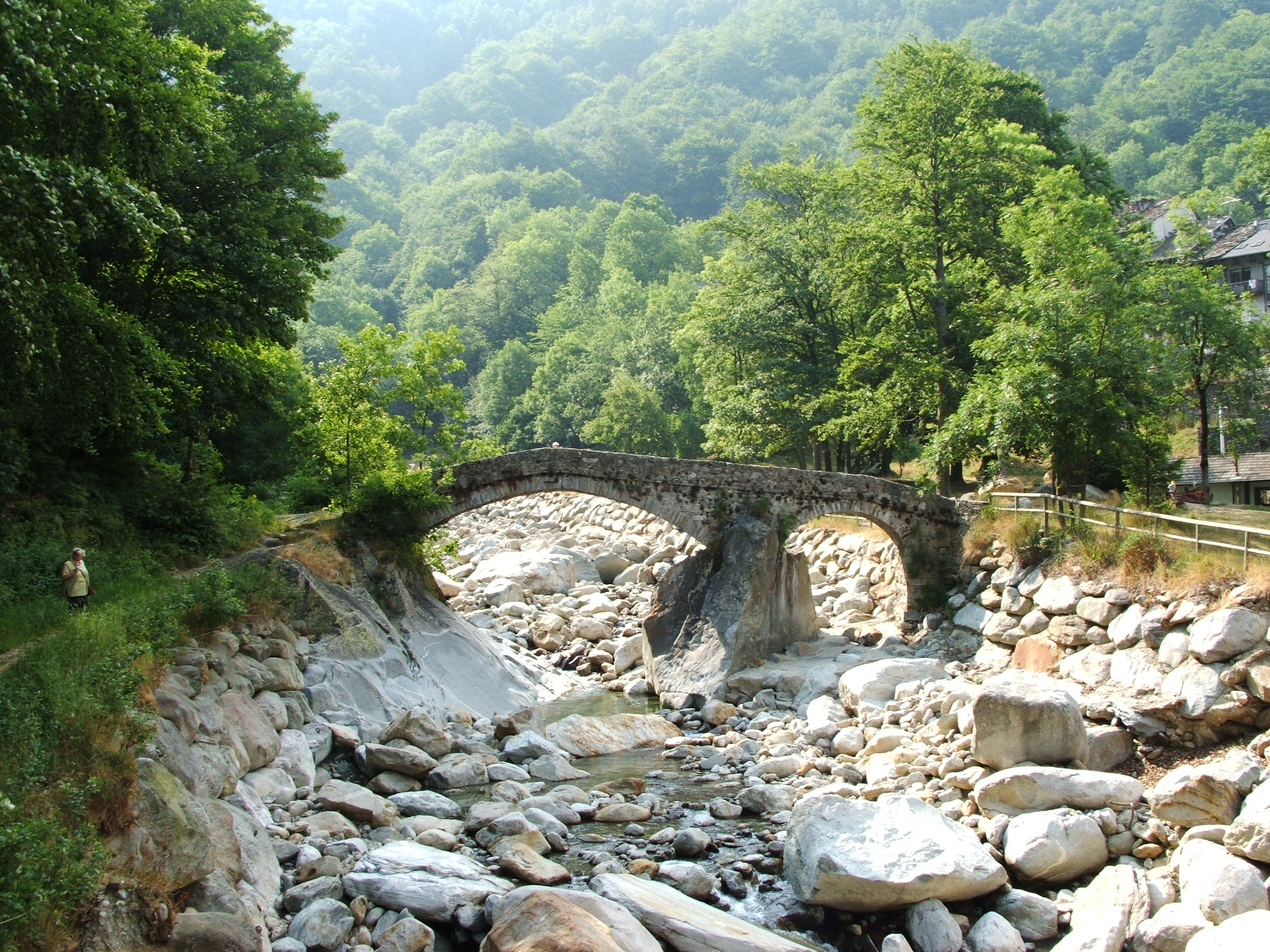
Antique bridge over the Cervo

== Demographic evolution ==
Historical population

Year	Pop.	±%
1861	1,527	—
1871	1,436	−6.0%
1881	1,572	+9.5%
1901	1,372	−12.7%
1911	1,427	+4.0%

Year	Pop.	±%
1921	1,259	−11.8%
1931	1,029	−18.3%
1936	691	−32.8%
1951	565	−18.2%
1961	471	−16.6%

Year	Pop.	±%
1971	328	−30.4%
1981	260	−20.7%
1991	191	−26.5%
2001	187	−2.1%

Source: Data from ISTAT

== Twin towns ==
Piedicavallo is twinned with:

- Avrieux, France (2009)
