= Camandona =

- Comune
- Comune di Camandona
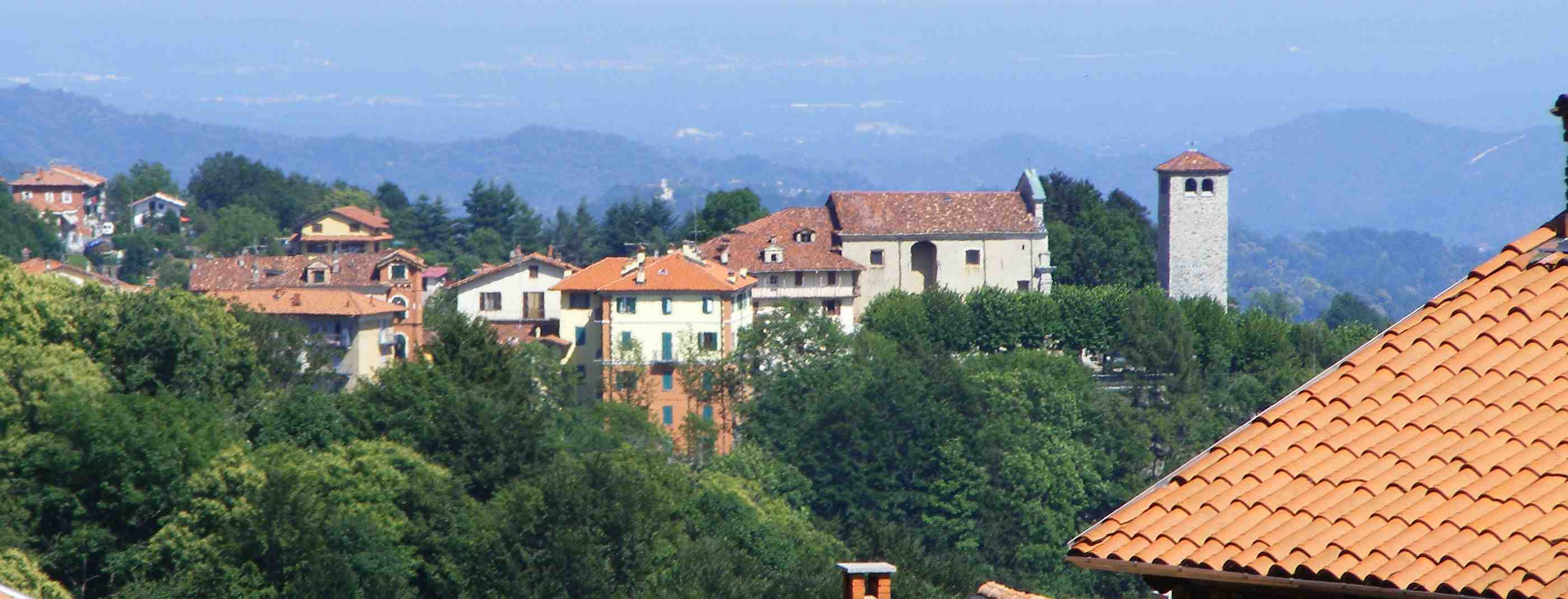
- View of Camandona

- Coat of arms

- Location within Italy Location within Piedmont
- Coordinates: 45°38′N 8°8′E
- Country: Italy
- Region: Piedmont
- Province: Province of Biella (BI)
- Frazioni: Canova, Cerale, Dagostino, Falletti-Guelpa, Gallo, Governati, Mino, Molino, Pianezze, Piazza, Vacchiero, Viglieno

Area
  - Total: 9.5 km^{2} (3.7 sq mi)

Population (Dec. 2004)
  - Total: 425
  - Density: 45/km^{2} (120/sq mi)
- Time zone: UTC+1 (CET)
  - Summer (DST): UTC+2 (CEST)
- Postal code: 13050
- Dialing code: 015

Camandona is a comune (municipality) in the Province of Biella in the Italian region Piedmont, located about 70 kilometres (43 mi) northeast of Turin and about 9 kilometres (6 mi) northeast of Biella. As of 31 December 2004, it had a population of 425 and an area of 9.5 square kilometres (3.7 mi^{2}).

Camandona borders the following municipalities: Bioglio, Callabiana, Pettinengo, Piatto, Trivero, Vallanzengo, Valle San Nicolao, Veglio.

== Demographic evolution ==
Historical population

Year	Pop.	±%
1861	2,412	—
1871	2,189	−9.2%
1881	2,445	+11.7%
1901	2,555	+4.5%
1911	2,316	−9.4%

Year	Pop.	±%
1921	1,548	−33.2%
1931	1,002	−35.3%
1936	852	−15.0%
1951	958	+12.4%
1961	836	−12.7%

Year	Pop.	±%
1971	647	−22.6%
1981	485	−25.0%
1991	435	−10.3%
2001	401	−7.8%

Source: Data from ISTAT

== Twin towns ==
Camandona is twinned with:

- Faucigny, France (2011)

== Photo gallery ==
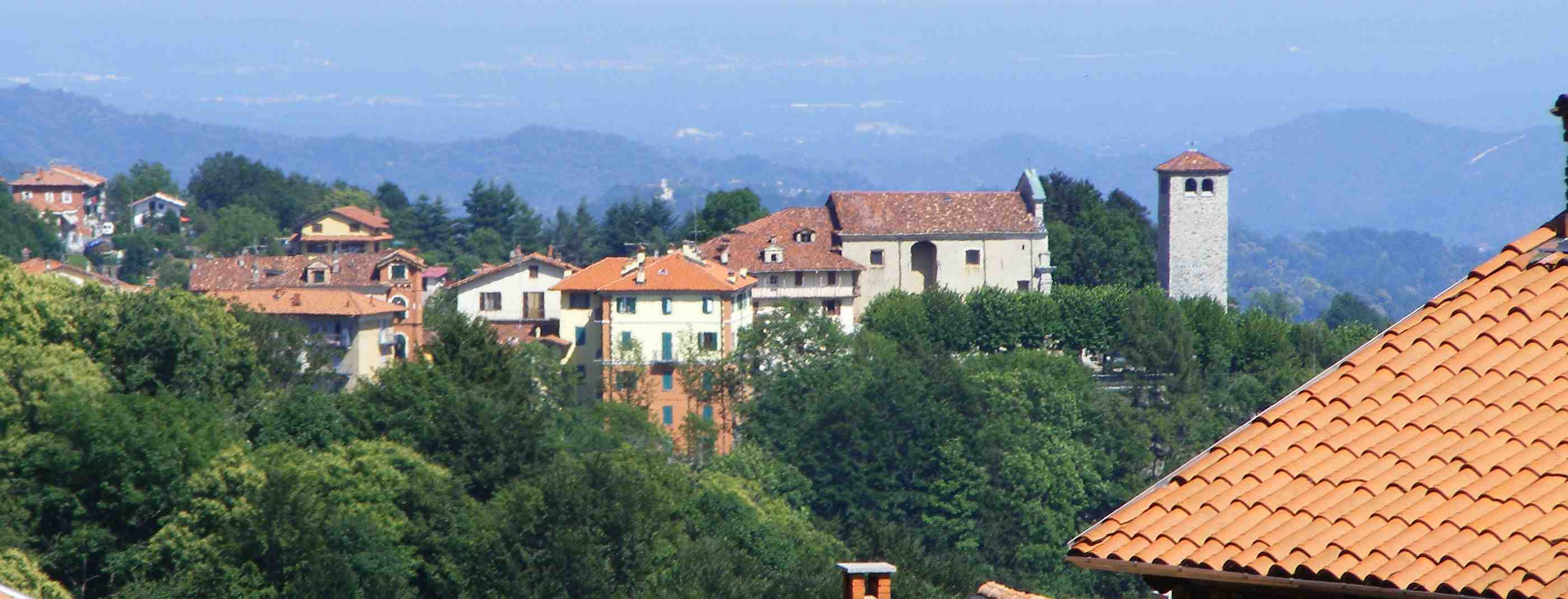
Center, seen from Guelpa

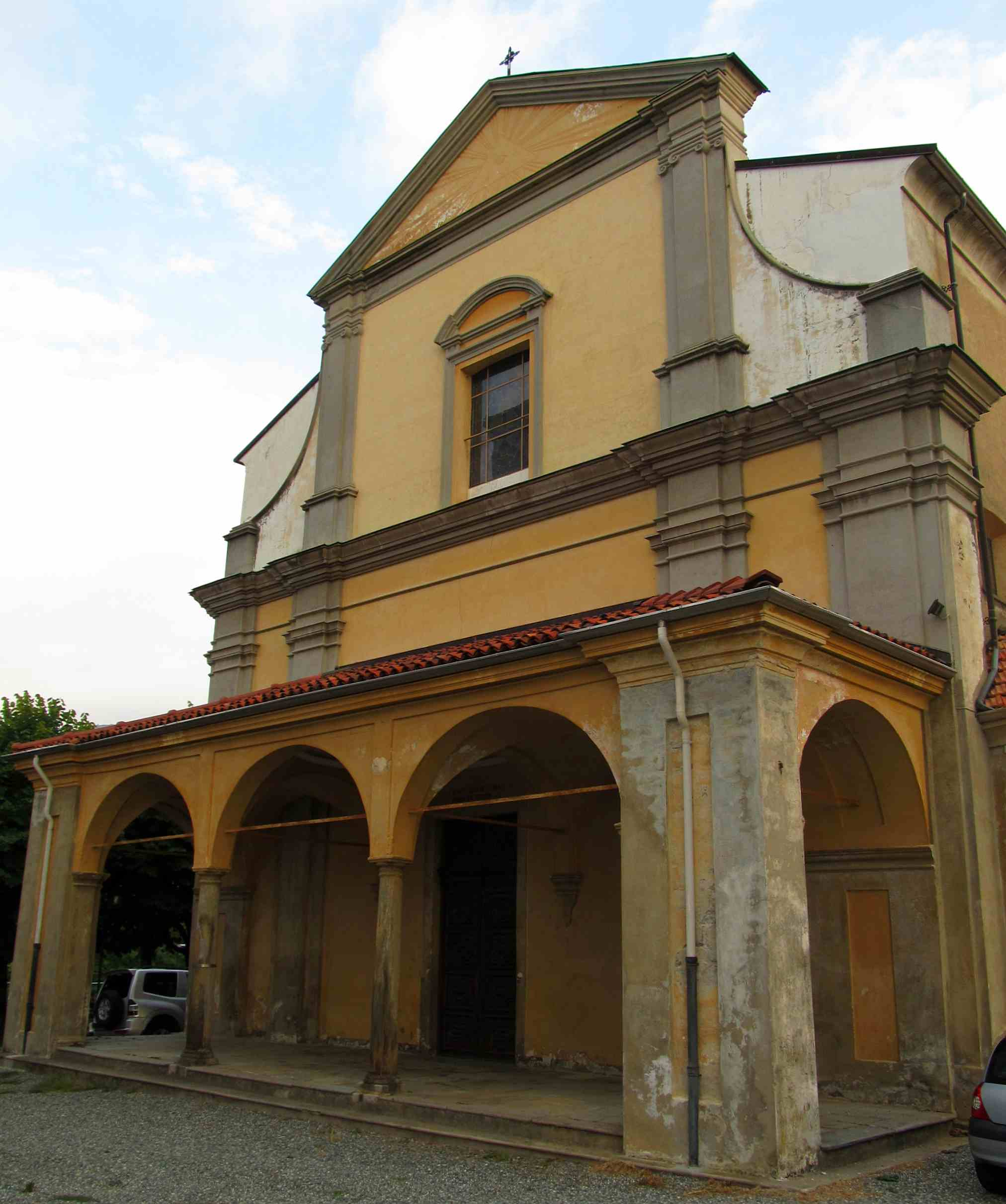
Parish church facade

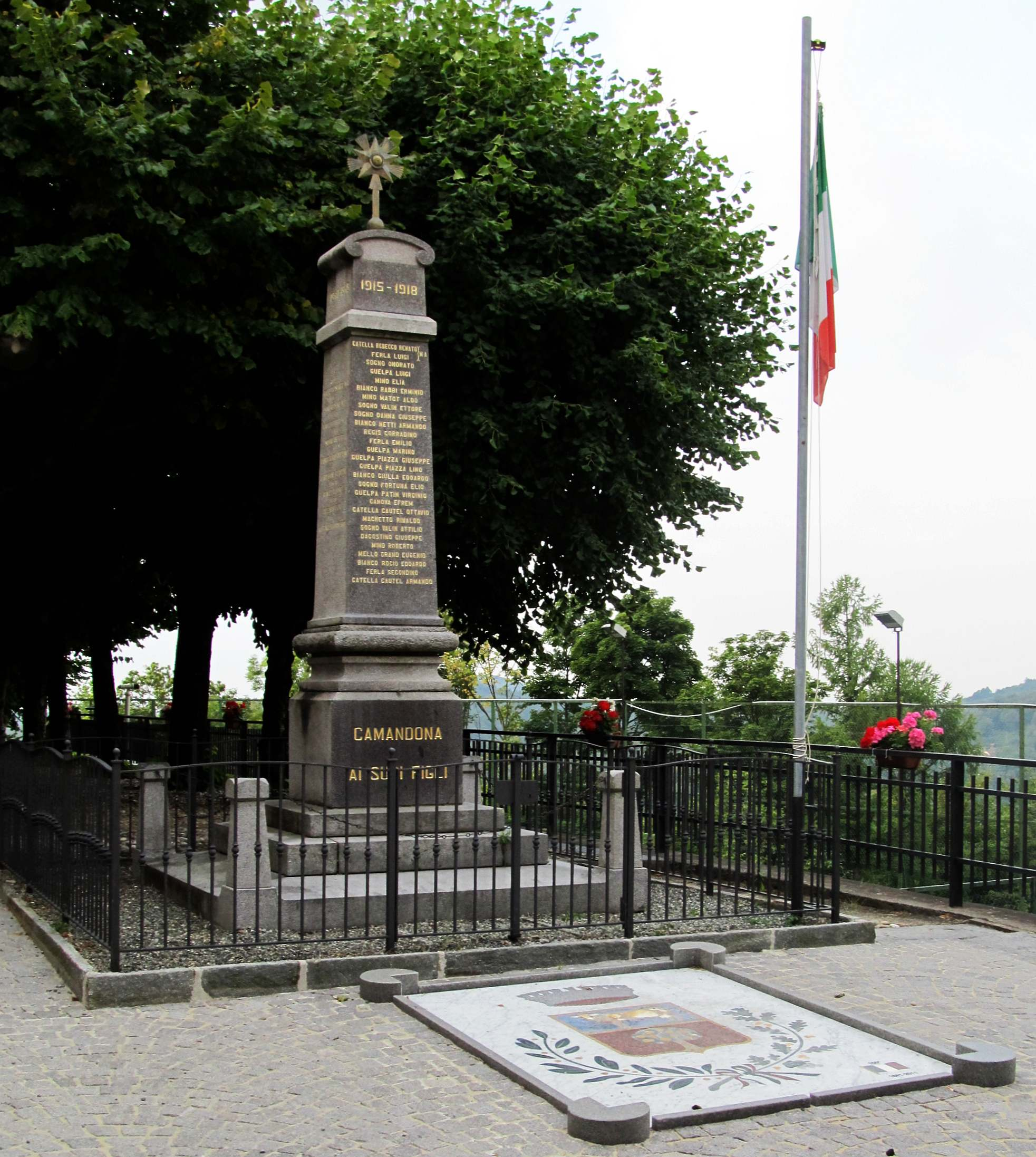
War memorial

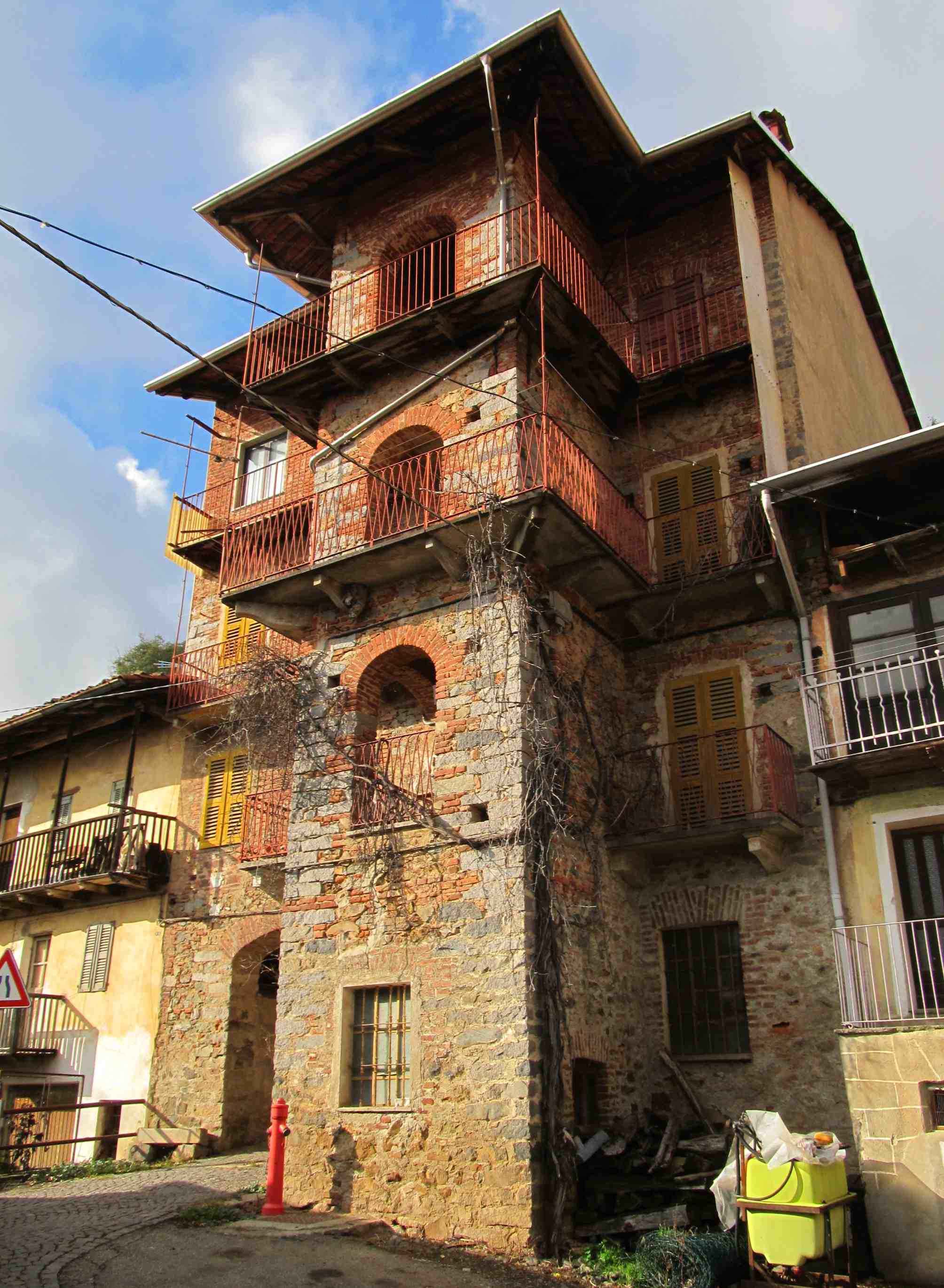
Frazione Guelpa

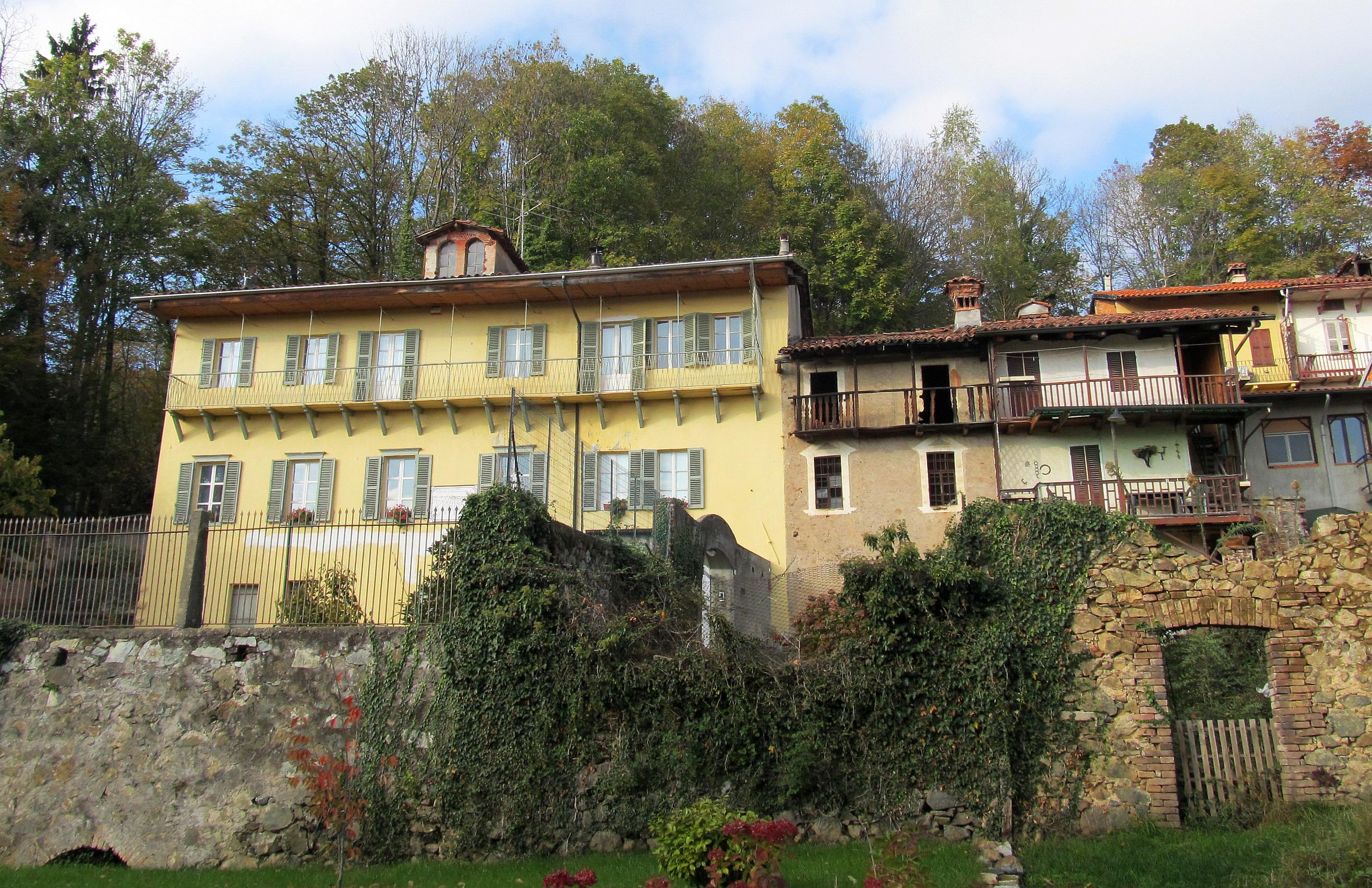
Frazione Gallo

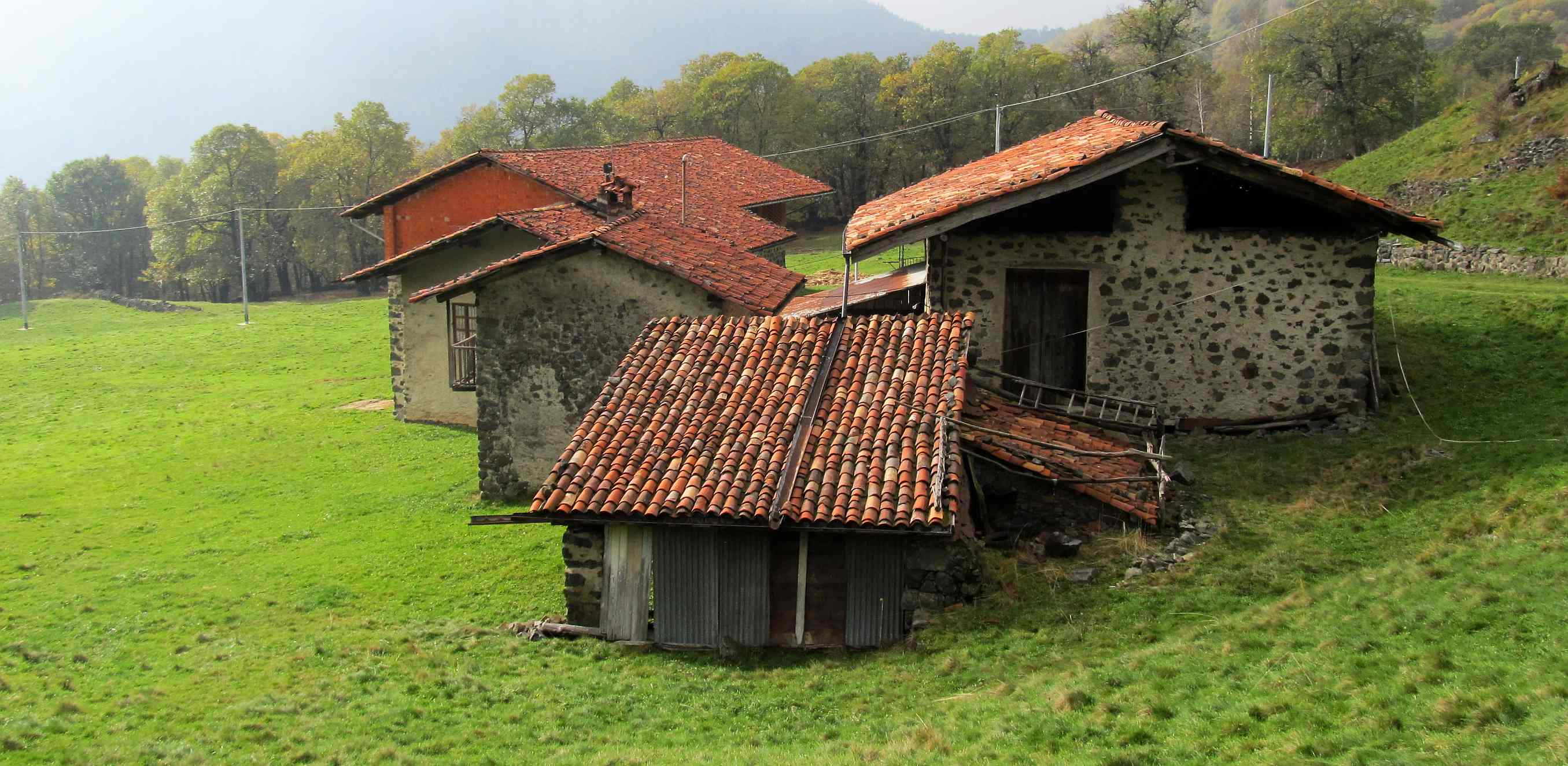
Alpe Carcheccio
