= Callabiana =

- Comune
- Comune di Callabiana
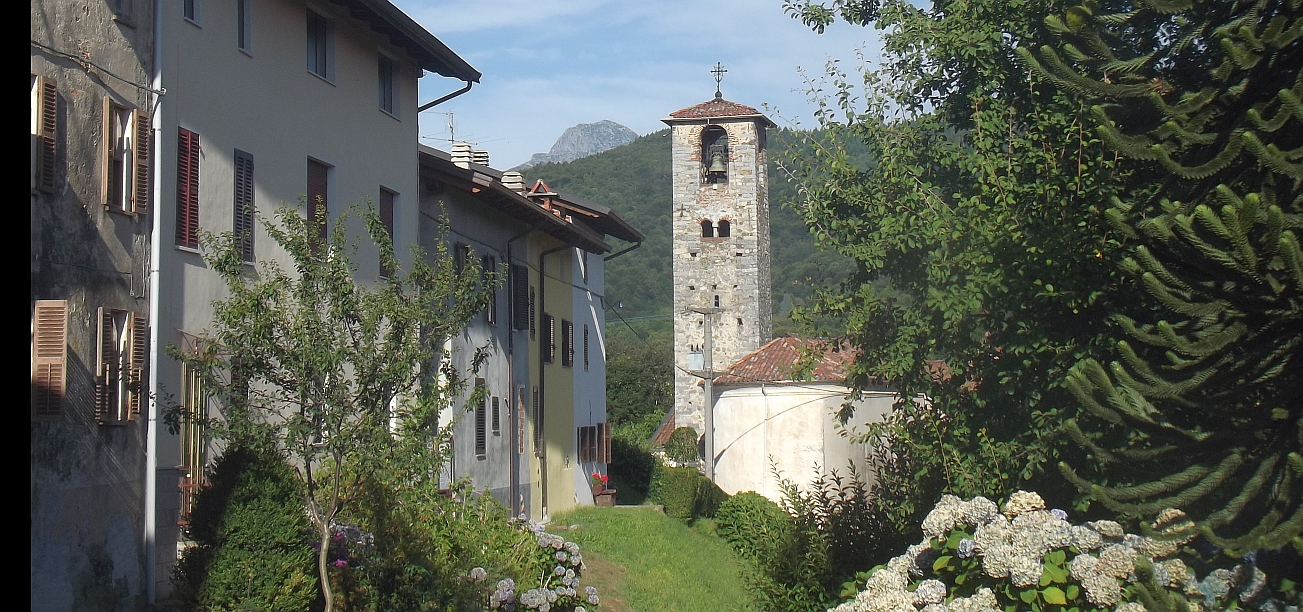
- View of Callabiana

- Coat of arms

- Location within Italy Location within Piedmont
- Coordinates: 45°36′N 8°3′E
- Country: Italy
- Region: Piedmont
- Province: Biella (BI)
- Frazioni: Cordaro, Corte, Fusero, Lucca, Pianezze, Ribatto, Socco, Nelva, Pettani, Stellio, Trabbia, Vacchione, Valle, Virla

Government
  - Mayor: Lorenzo Vercellotti (centre-right, elected June 15, 2009)

Area
  - Total: 7.32 km^{2} (2.83 sq mi)
- Elevation: 743 m (2,438 ft)

Population (Dec. 2004)
  - Total: 139
  - Density: 19.0/km^{2} (49.2/sq mi)
- Demonym: Callabianesi
- Time zone: UTC+1 (CET)
  - Summer (DST): UTC+2 (CEST)
- Postal code: 13821
- Dialing code: 015
- Patron saint: Madonna degli Angeli
- Saint day: 15 August

Callabiana is a comune (municipality) in the Province of Biella in the Italian region Piedmont, located about 70 kilometres (43 mi) northeast of Turin and about 4 kilometres (2 mi) northwest of Biella. As of 31 December 2004, it had a population of 139 and an area of 7.3 square kilometres (2.8 mi^{2}).

Callabiana borders the following municipalities: Andorno Micca, Bioglio, Camandona, Gaby, Pettinengo, Piatto, Piedicavallo, Tavigliano, Vallanzengo.

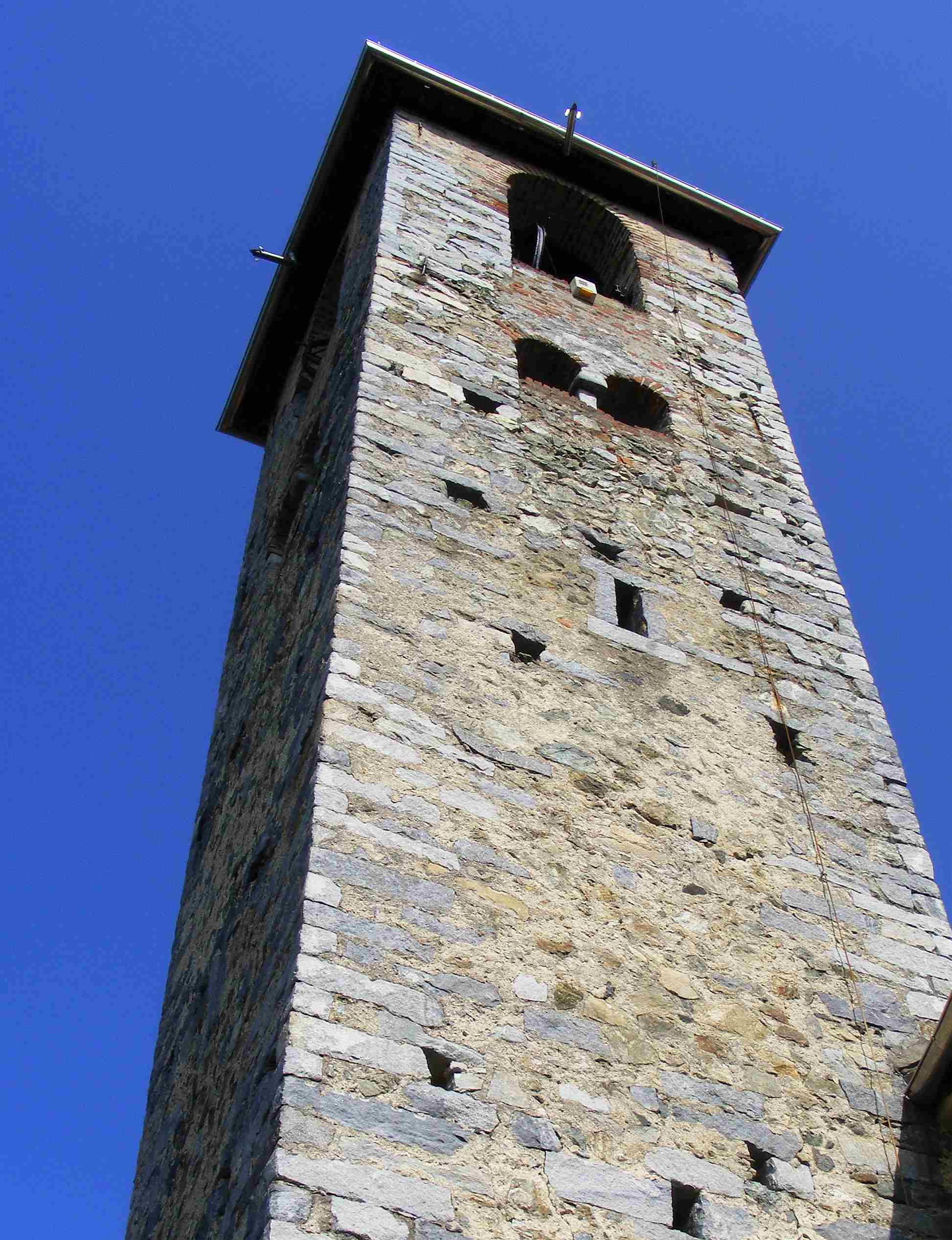
Parish church's tower

Callabiana is on the slopes of Monte Casto. The whole territory is divided into 15 hamlets: Trabbia, Lucca, Virla, Socco, Steglio, Cordaro, Nelva, Corte, Fusero, Chiesa, Pianezze, Cascina Nuova, Vacchione, Pettani and Ribatto. The most important one is Pianezze, which has an important textile factory, called Carlo Barbera, where luxury clothes sold all over the world are made. Callabiana is also known for its dam where many people from all the district of Biella go fishing and relaxing. Quite all the territory of the district is covered by woods, inhabited by foxes, wild boars, squirrels and many kind of birds. In autumn mushrooms and chestnuts are searched in these woods. Gibello, Nelva, Vercellotti and Trabbia, are typical surnames of Callabiana and almost all the population has one of them. The most important building is the church, built in the 16th century, where the parish priest of Camandona, a neighbouring village, has been celebrating mass every Sunday since the death of Armando Strona, the last priest of Callabiana. The village festival is on 15 August, and so during all that month there are celebrations at the Pro Loco, that reach their climax with the big lunch on the 15th, a not to be missed appointment for everyone in the village. In summer many emigrants come back to their houses, and so you can meet someone from France, mostly Savoie, Belgium and Germany. Almost everybody in the village has some relatives abroad, because in the first part of the 1900, many people left Callabiana to look for work abroad.

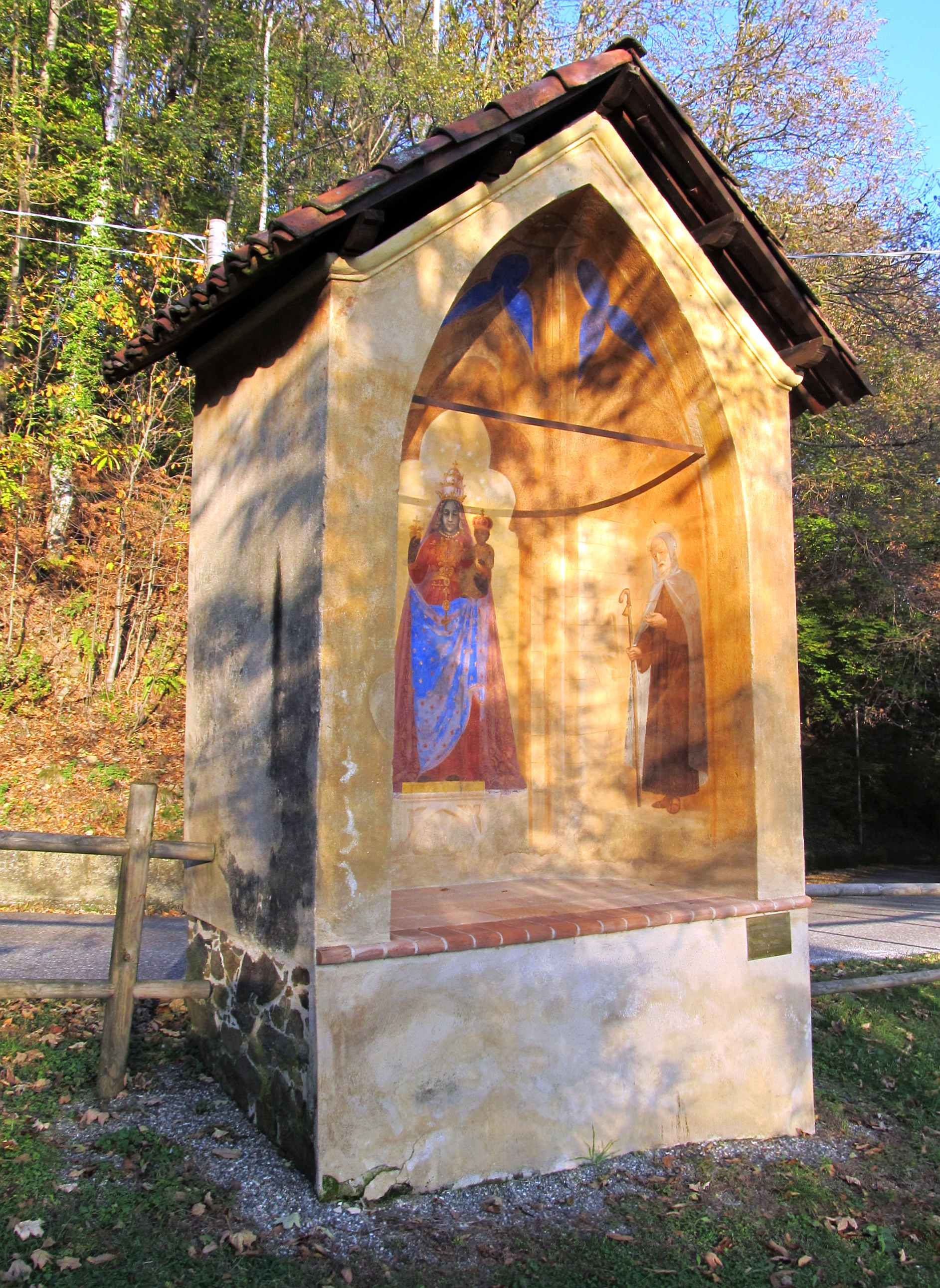
Votive chapel devoted to the Black Virgin of Oropa

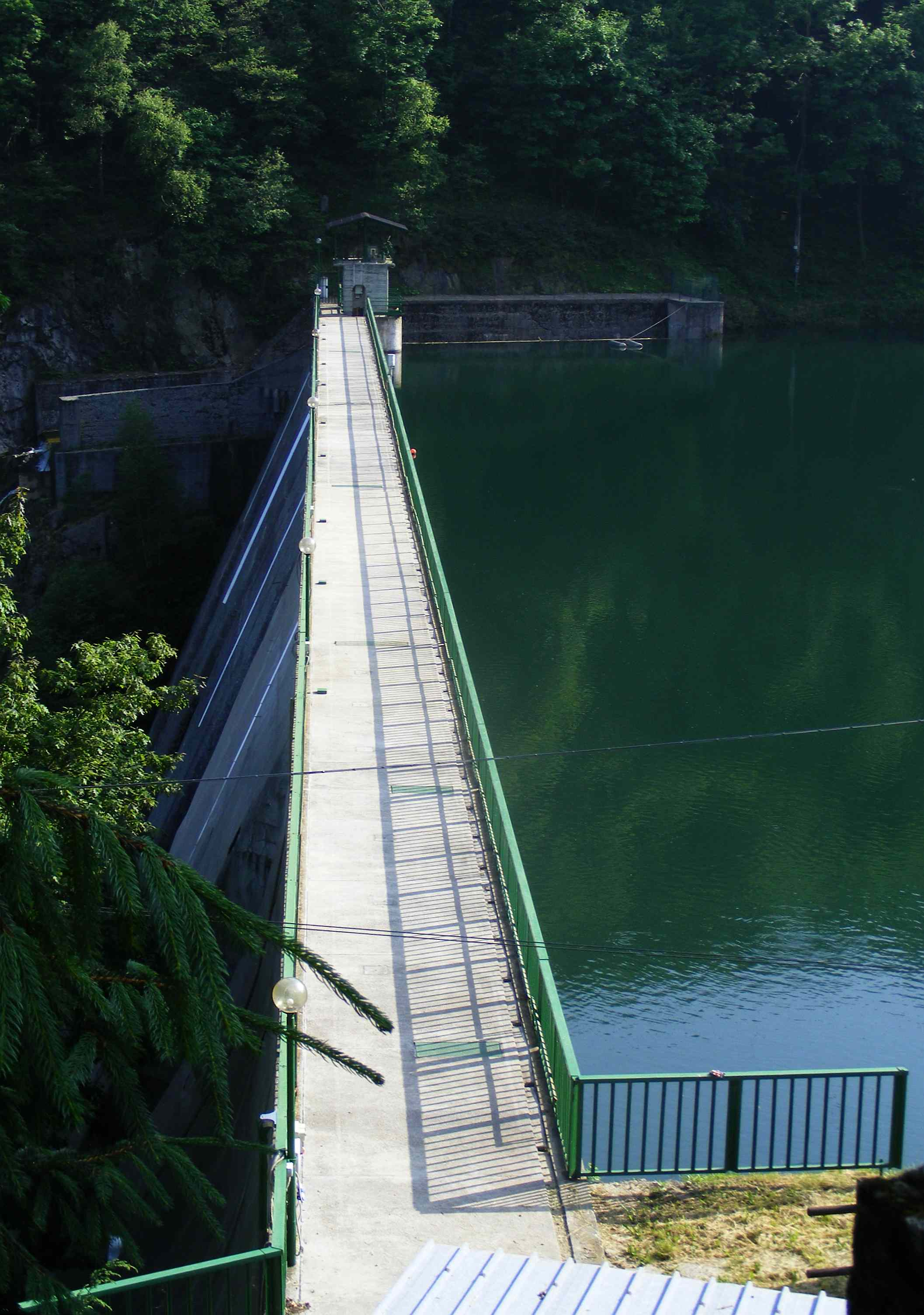
Ponte Vittorio's dam

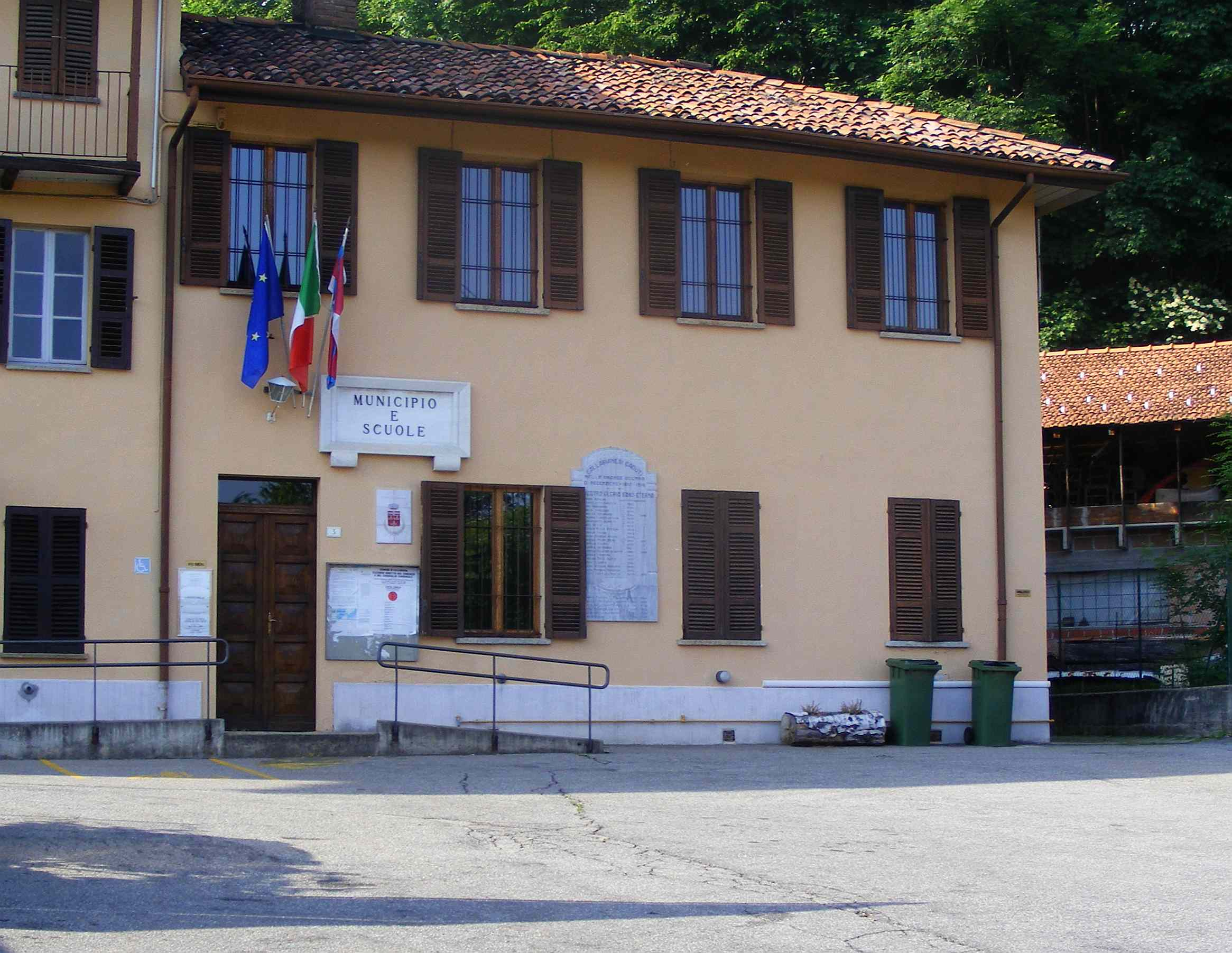
Town hall

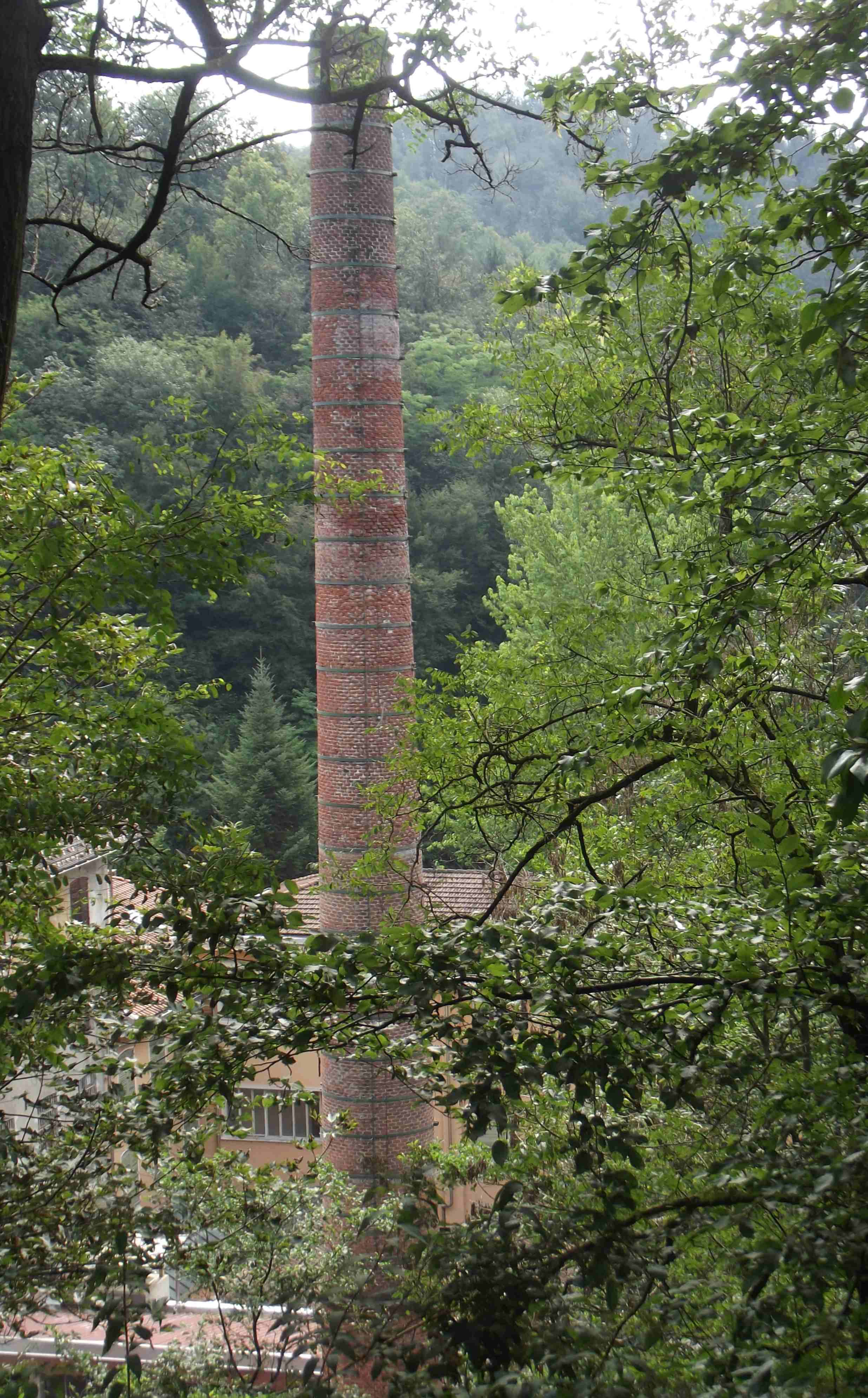
The old cymney stack of Carlo Barbera textile factory

== Demographic evolution ==
Historical population

Year	Pop.	±%
1861	748	—
1871	808	+8.0%
1881	802	−0.7%
1901	652	−18.7%
1911	614	−5.8%

Year	Pop.	±%
1921	492	−19.9%
1931	401	−18.5%
1936	351	−12.5%
1951	376	+7.1%
1961	263	−30.1%

Year	Pop.	±%
1971	200	−24.0%
1981	195	−2.5%
1991	170	−12.8%
2001	144	−15.3%

Source: Data from ISTAT
