= Rassa, Piedmont =

Rassa
- Comune
- Comune di Rassa
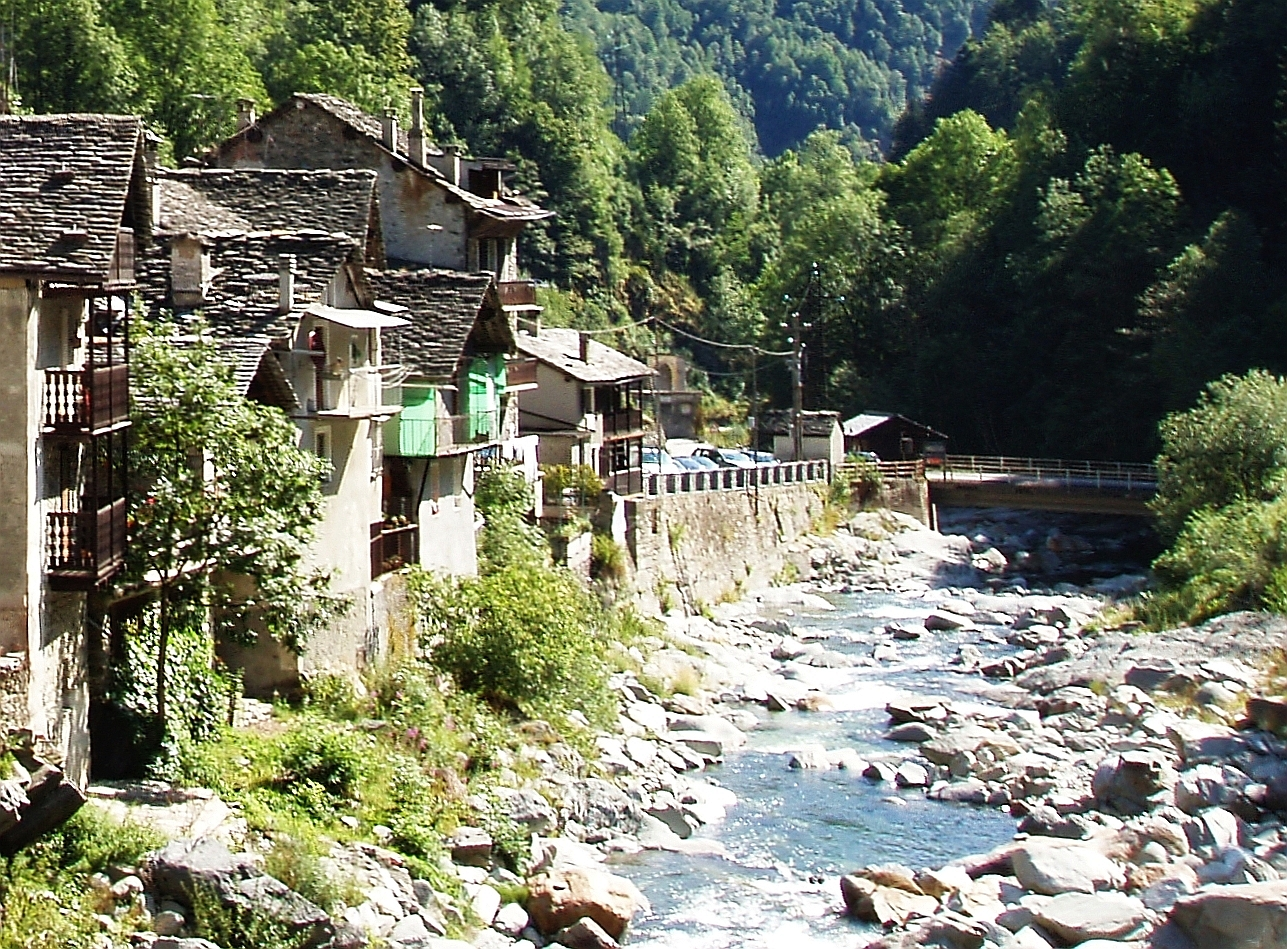
- Sorba Creek in Rassa

- Coat of arms

- Location within Italy Location within Piedmont
- Coordinates: 45°46′N 8°1′E
- Country: Italy
- Region: Piedmont
- Province: Vercelli (VC)

Government
  - Mayor: Fabrizio Tocchio

Area
  - Total: 44.4 km^{2} (17.1 sq mi)

Population (31 October 2008)
  - Total: 77
  - Density: 1.7/km^{2} (4.5/sq mi)
- Demonym: Rassesi
- Time zone: UTC+1 (CET)
  - Summer (DST): UTC+2 (CEST)
- Postal code: 13020
- Dialing code: 0163
- Patron saint: Holy Cross
- Saint day: 3 May

Rassa is a comune (municipality) in the Province of Vercelli in the Italian region Piedmont, located about 80 kilometres (50 mi) northeast of Turin and about 60 kilometres (37 mi) northwest of Vercelli, located in the upper Valsesia.

The Punta Tre Vescovi is located in its territory.

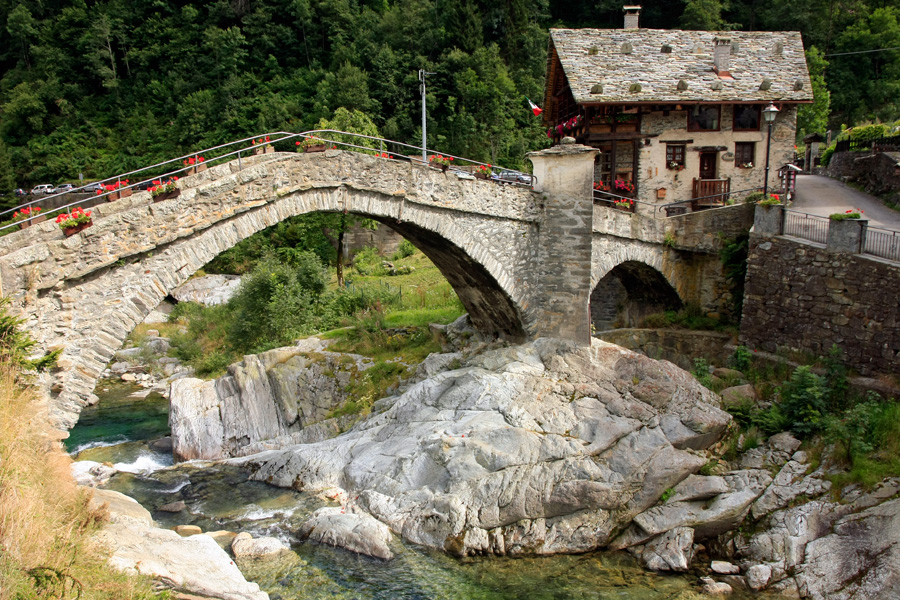
Medieval bridge over the Gronda torrent
