= Cervo (river) =

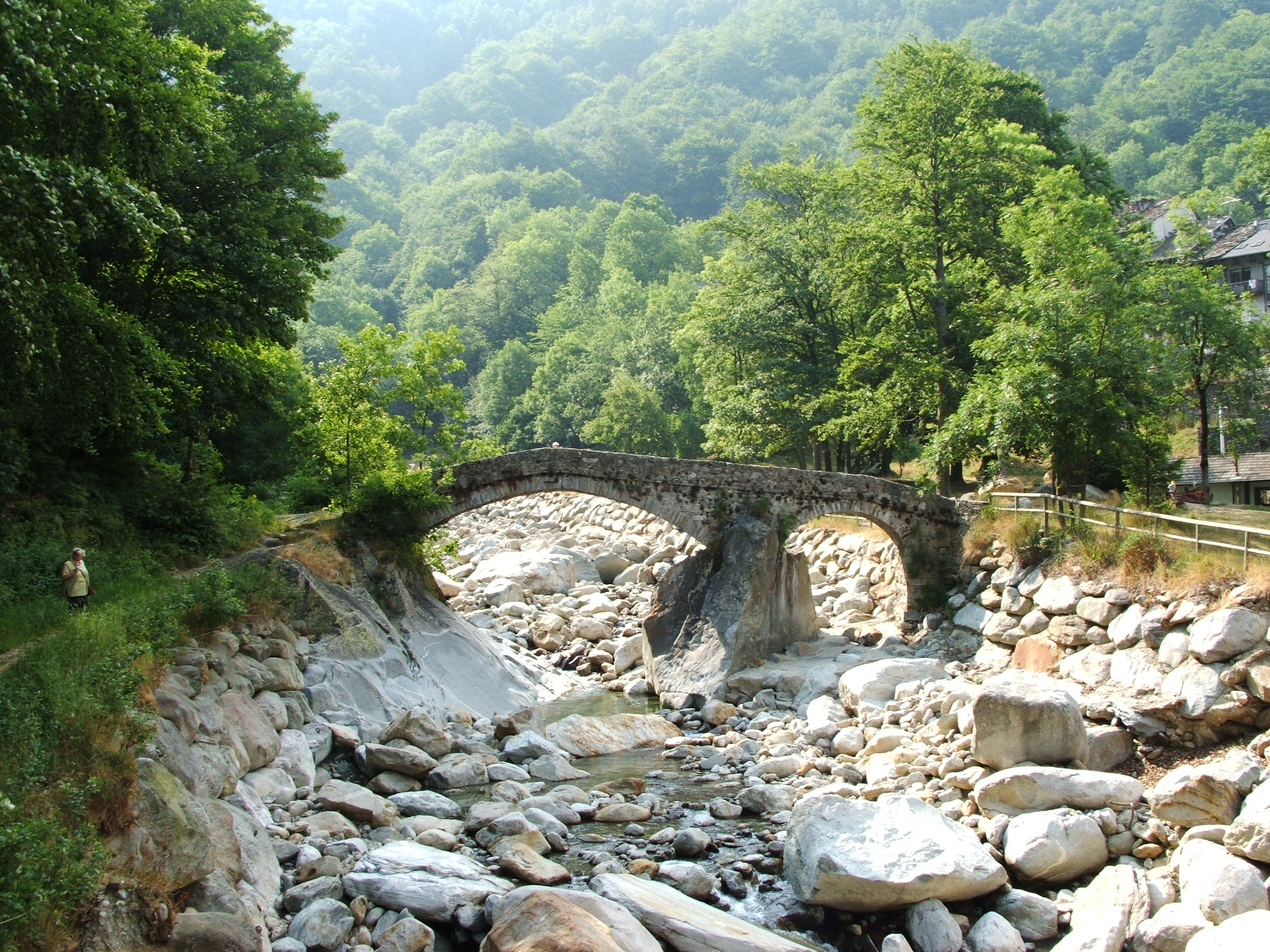
- The old bridge at Piedicavallo in the Valle del Cervo

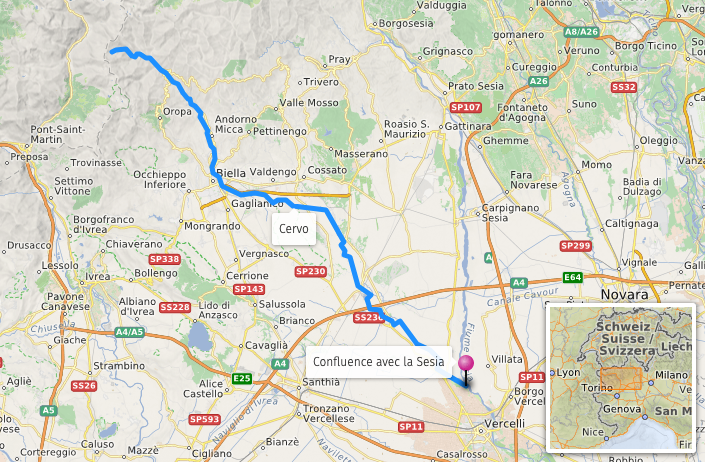
- Cervo location

Location
- Country: Italy: provinces of Biella and Vercelli

Physical characteristics
- Source
  - location: Lago della Vecchia - Prealpi biellesi (BI)
  - elevation: 1,900 m (6,200 ft)
- Mouth
  - location: River Sesia near Quinto Vercellese (VC)
  - coordinates: 45.3682°N 8.4033°E
  - elevation: 127.5 m (418 ft)
- Length: 65 km (40 mi)
- Basin size: 1,024 km^{2} (395 mi^{2})
- Discharge
  - average: (mouth) 21.9 m^{3}/s (770 cu ft/s)

Basin features
- Progression: Sesia
- Tributaries
  - left: Mologna, Chiobbia, Nelva, Strona di Mosso, Ostola, Guarabione, Rovasenda, Marchiazza
  - right: Irogna, Pragnetta, Oropa, Roggia Drumma, Roggia Ottina, Elvo

The Cervo (Piedmontese: Sar or Serv) is a 65-kilometre (40 mi) torrent (a form of seasonally intermittent stream) in the Piedmont region of north-west Italy. It is the principal tributary of the river Sesia, which itself is a significant tributary of the Po.

== Etymology ==
The name Cervo rather than from the Latin cervus (deer) should come from the Germanic saar (stream or river).

== Geography ==
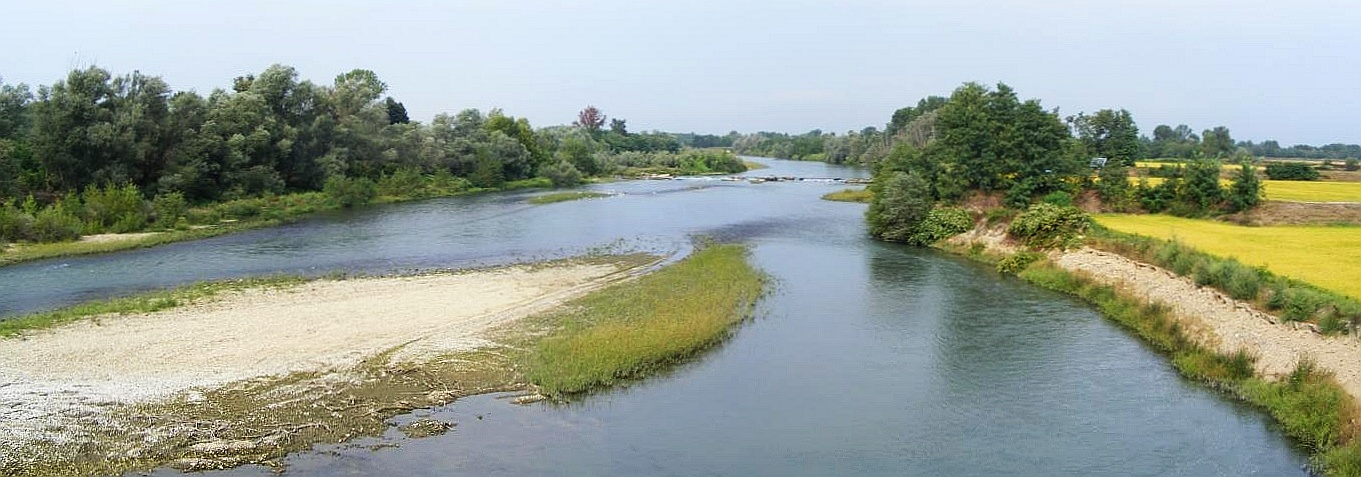
The Cervo crossing Po plain near Quinto Vercellese

It crosses the provinces of Biella (communes of Piedicavallo, Rosazza, Campiglia Cervo, Sagliano Micca, Andorno Micca, Tollegno, Biella, Candelo and Castelletto Cervo) and Vercelli (Quinto Vercellese).

The Cervo’s source is the Lago della Vecchia (close to the Rifugio della Vecchia) in the Biellese Prealps. From the Lago della Vecchia it flows rapidly through a large number of communes of the Valle del Cervo. Close to Tollegno it receives the torrent Oropa from the right then crosses the eastern part of the city of Biella, in particular the quarter of Chiavazza.

From here the valley widens and the torrent flows more slowly along a broad and pebbly stream bed. In this section of its course the Cervo is united with a number of modest tributaries: the Mologna, the Chiebbia, the Lu Rialet and the Bruma. Near the town of Cossato the flow grows visibly when the torrent is joined from the left by the Strona di Mosso. Near Castelletto Cervo it receives the waters of the Ostola and enters the plain of the province of Vercelli.

In the Vercellese plain, where the Canale Cavour crosses over the torrent, the Cervo is significantly enriched by the contribution of numerous minor water courses and canals. In the area of Collobiano it is joined by more important torrents: the Rovasenda and Marchiazza from the left and from the right the Elvo, its most important tributary.

At this point the Cervo turns from a torrent into a river which can be expected to flow continuously throughout the year. It advances lazily towards the Sesia which it joins near Quinto Vercellese as its most important tributary.

=== Main tributaries ===
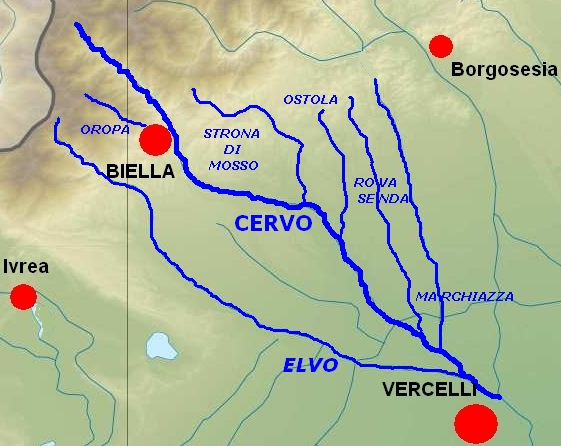
Main tributaries location

Left hand:

- Strona di Mosso;
- Ostola;
- Guarabione;
- Rovasenda;
- Marchiazza.

Right hand:

- Oropa;
- Elvo.

== Regime ==
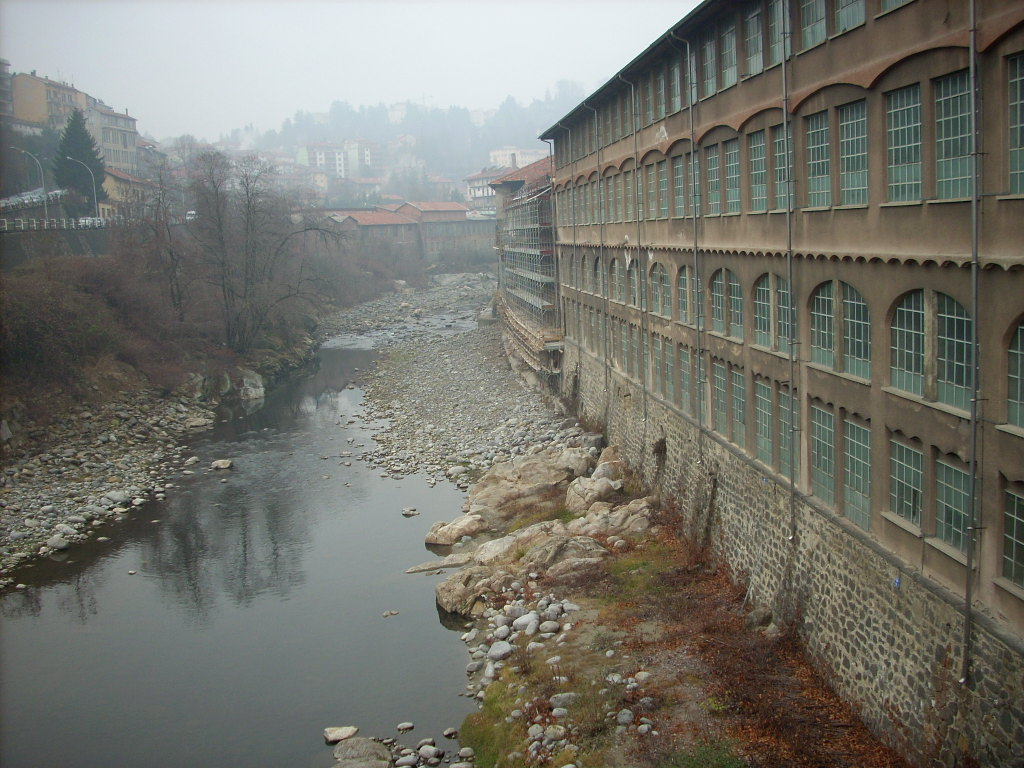
The torrent at Biella

Despite the Cervo’s generous mean discharge of about 22 cubic metres per second (780 cu ft/s) at its confluence with the Sesia, its regime is sharply torrential. The highest rates of flow occur with the melting of the prealpine snows in the late spring, and above all with the autumn rains. The latter can lead to such disastrous floods as occurred in 1968 and 2002. In the summer, however, the discharge is much diminished and significant tracts may dry up completely as a result of the heavy exploitation of its water.

== Angling and water quality ==
The Cervo is classified as a “Category A” water course in the upper Valle Cervo from its source to Biella; here trouts are present. Beyond Biella and in the Vercellese plain members of the carp family are found and it falls into “Category B”.

== See also ==
- Hydrography of the Biella region

== Notes and references ==
The initial version of this article was a translation of this version of the article it:Cervo (torrente) in the Italian Wikipedia.

== Other projects ==
Media related to Cervo (torrent) at Wikimedia Commons
