= Ostola =

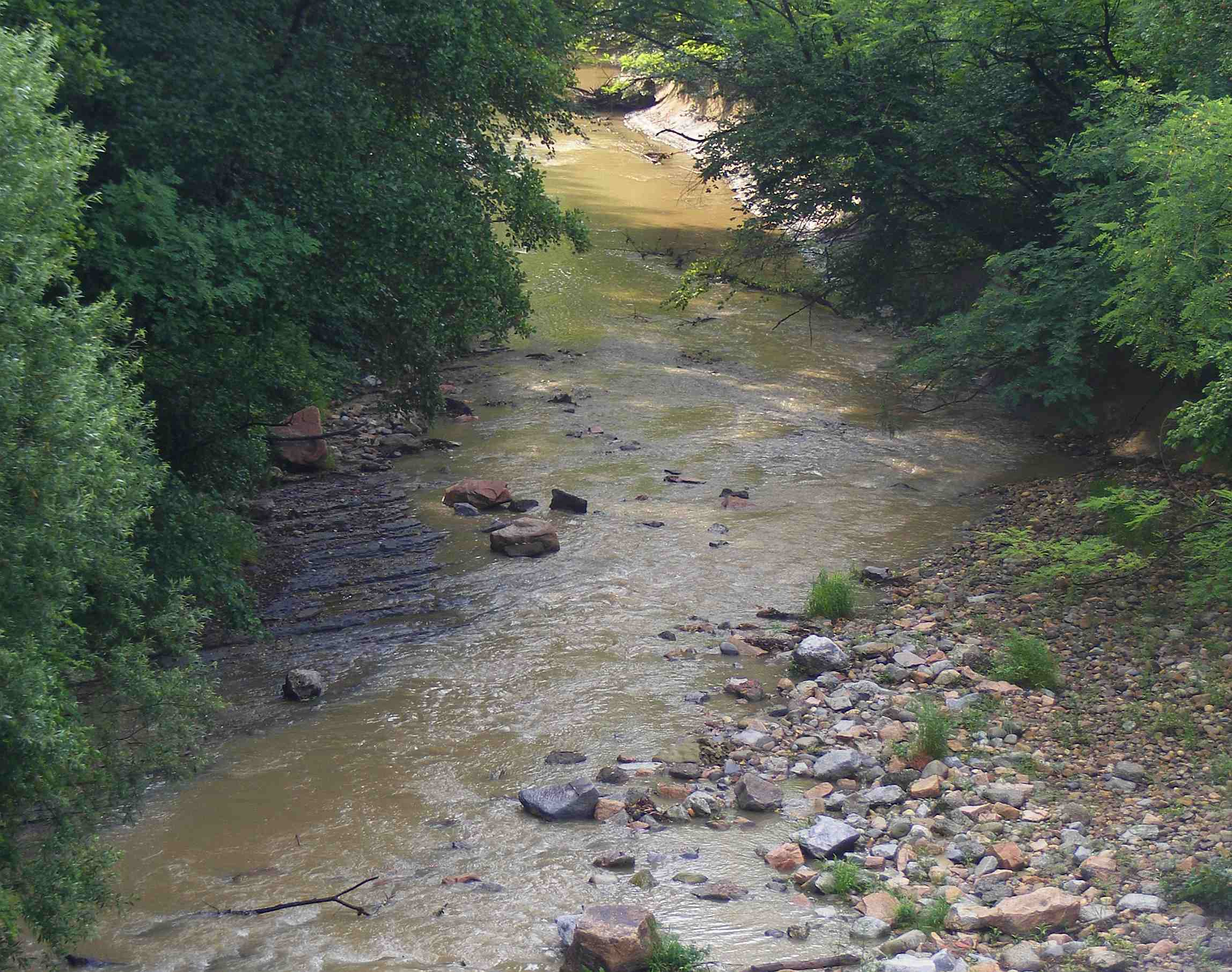
- The creek around Masserano

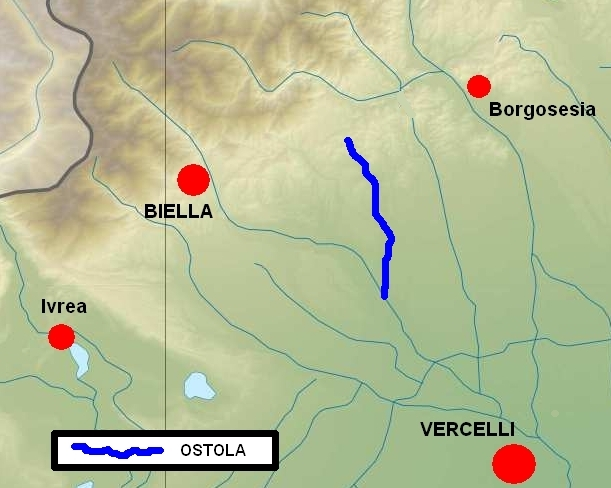
- Location within Biella

Location
- Country: Italy

Physical characteristics
- Source
  - location: Monte Capoposto (Soprana)
  - elevation: 600 m (2,000 ft)
- Mouth
  - location: Cervo near Castelletto Cervo
  - coordinates: 45°30′30″N 8°14′00″E
- Length: 25.5 km (15.8 mi)
- Basin size: 65 km^{2} (25 sq mi)
- Discharge
  - average: 1.3 m^{3}/s (46 cu ft/s)

Basin features
- Progression: Cervo→ Sesia→ Po→ Adriatic Sea

The Ostola is a 25 km long stream (torrente) in the Piedmont region of north-western Italy. It'is a left side tributary of the Cervo which flows through the Province of Biella.

== Geography ==
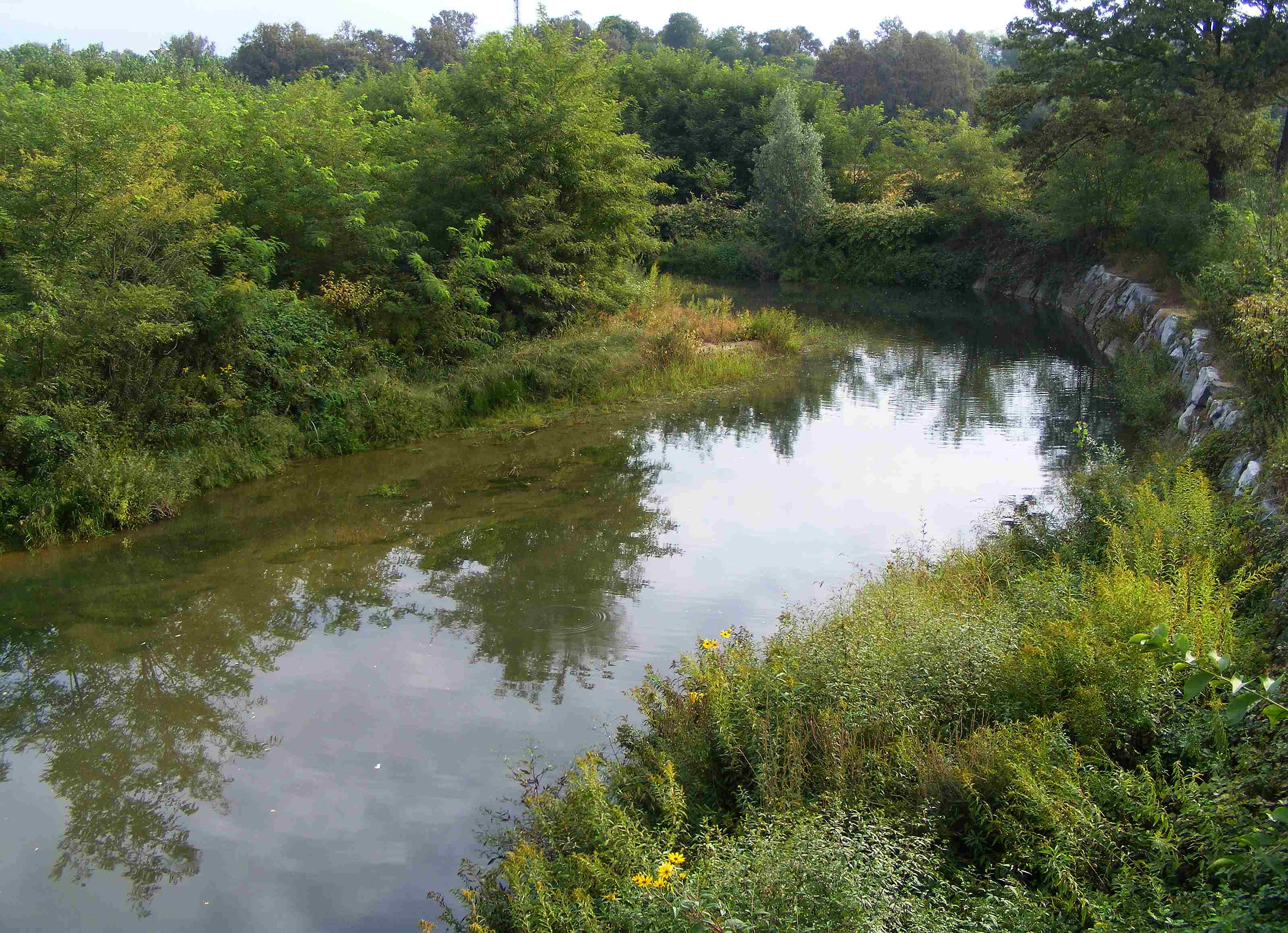
The Ostola in Castelletto Cervo

The Ostola source is on the southern slopes of Monte Capoposto (750 m), in the eastern and hilly part of the Alpi Biellesi, from which it flows through the communes of Soprana, Mezzana Mortigliengo and Casapinta. In the territory of Masserano it receives the waters of Torrente Cigliaga and is blocked by a dam forming the artificial lake "delle Piane". Flowing southwards the Ostola receives from the left side its mayor tributary, the Bisingana. It then enters the Po plain and near Castelletto Cervo it flows into the river Cervo.

== Other projects ==
Media related to Ostola at Wikimedia Commons
