= Elvo =

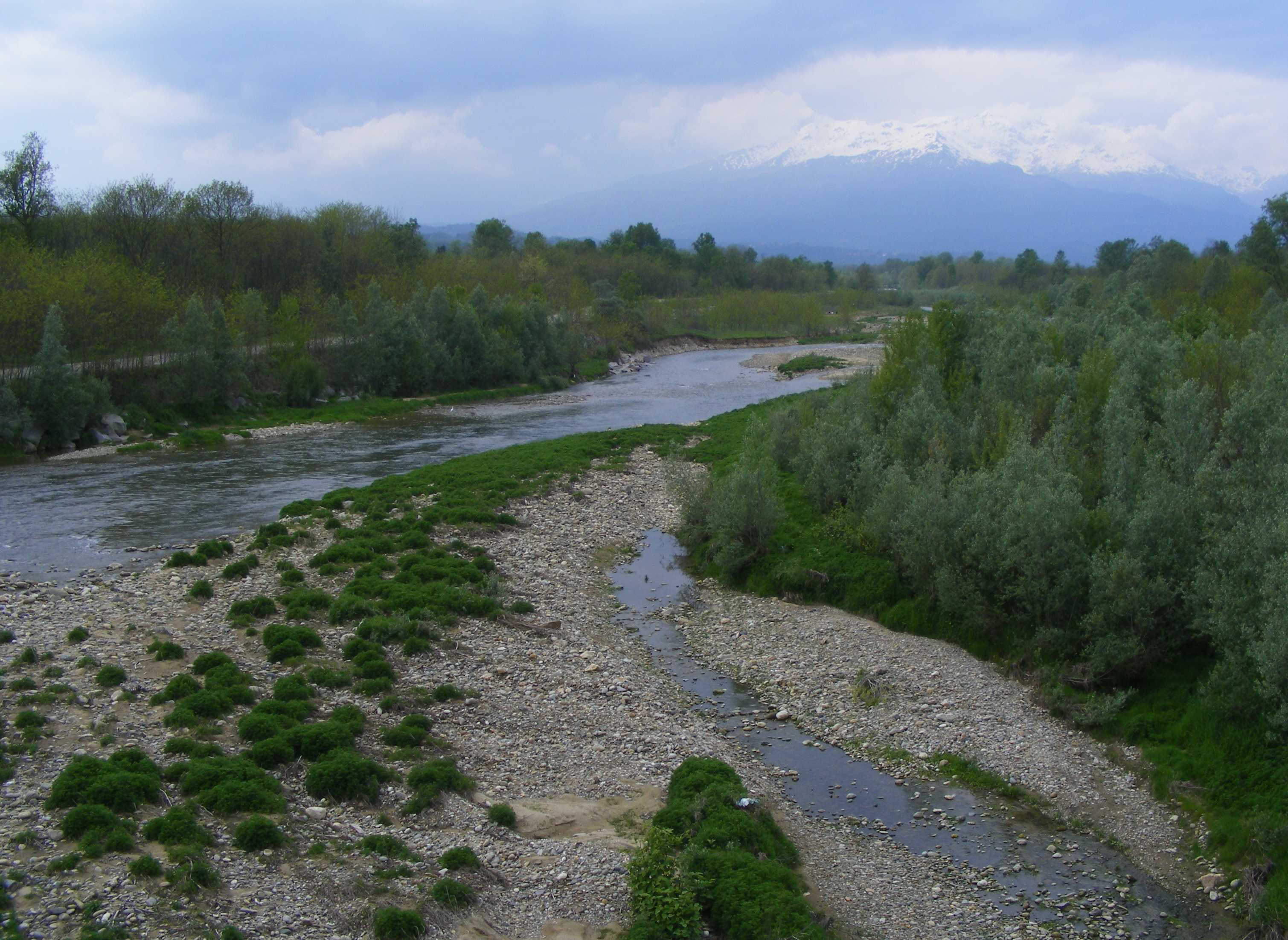
- The Elvo near Cerrione

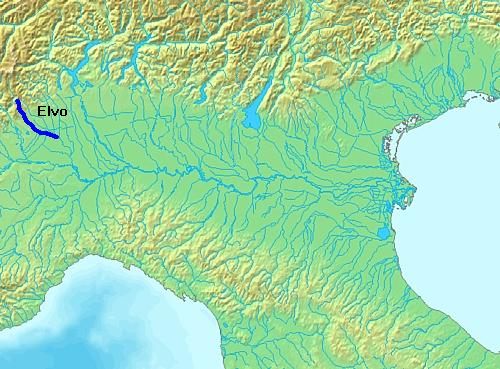
- Elvo location within northern Italy

Location
- Country: Italy: provinces of Biella and Vercelli

Physical characteristics
- Source
  - location: Monte Mars in the Biellese Prealps
  - elevation: 2,600 m (8,500 ft)
- Mouth
  - location: Cervo near Quinto Vercellese (VC)
  - coordinates: 45°23′15″N 8°21′42″E
- Length: 53 km (33 mi)
- Basin size: 300 km^{2} (120 mi^{2})
- Discharge
  - average: 6.8 m^{3}/s (240 cu ft/s)

Basin features
- Progression: Cervo→ Sesia→ Po→ Adriatic Sea
- Tributaries
  - left: Oremo
  - right: Janca, Ingagna, Olobbia

The Elvo (Piedmontese: Elv) is a 53-kilometre (33 mi) torrent (an intermittent stream) in the Piedmont region of north-west Italy and is the principal tributary of the Cervo. It runs through the communes of Sordevolo, Occhieppo Superiore, Occhieppo Inferiore, Cerrione and Salussola in the Province of Biella, and of Carisio and Casanova Elvo in the Province of Vercelli.

The river’s valley is named after it as the Valle dell'Elvo. Here the municipalities are organized into two comunità montane: the Comunità Montana Alta Valle Elvo in the upper part of the valley, and the Comunità Montana Bassa Valle Elvo in the lower.

Many of the water courses of the Canavese and of the area of Biella—the torrent Orco, for example—are noted for the presence of gold-bearing sands. In the case of the Elvo, these are concentrated in the area of the Bessa nature reserve.

== Course ==
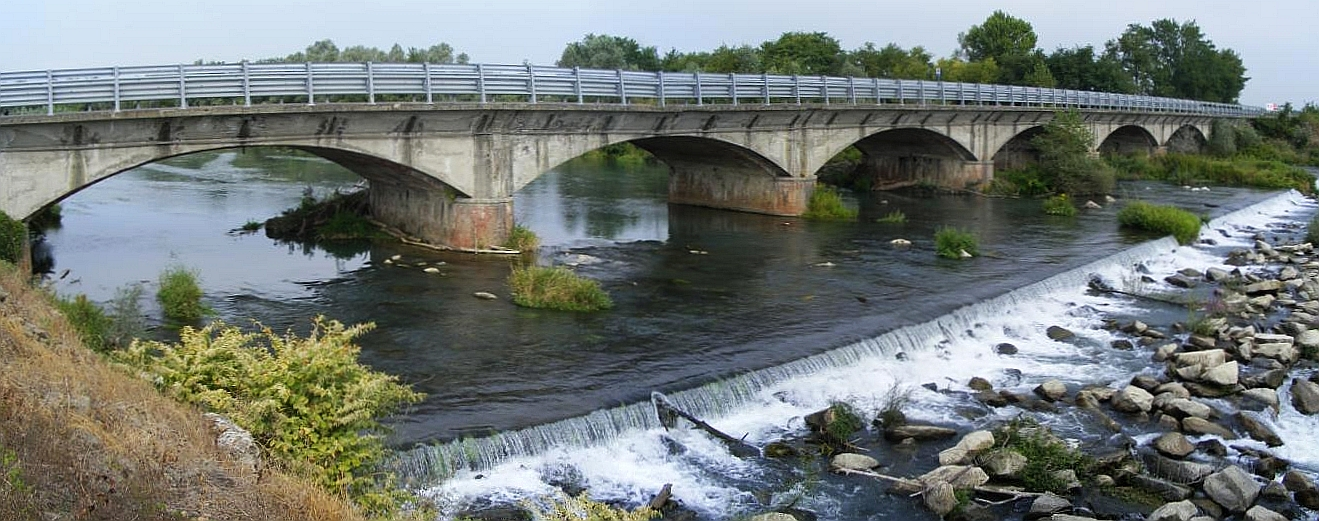
The river between Collobiano and Quinto

The river’s source is at an elevation of about 2,600 metres (8,500 ft) on the slopes of Monte Mars, in the heart of the Biellese Prealps. Having passed through various centres of population, it is joined from the right at Mongrando by its major tributary, the Viona. From here its broad pebbly shores follow the edge of the Bessa nature reserve, which lies to its right and is part of the Riserva naturale orientata delle Baragge.

Near Salussola it enters into the plains of Vercelli and follows a slower and more sinuous course before emptying into the Cervo near Quinto Vercellese.

== Regime ==
The Elvo has a regime typical of a prealpine Italian torrent with maximum discharges in the autumn and spring together with a tendency to dry up in the summer and winter months. In the event of high levels of precipitation it is liable to become ‘torrential’.

== Notes ==
This article was originally translated from its counterpart on the Italian Wikipedia, specifically from this version.

== Other projects ==
Media related to Elvo at Wikimedia Commons
