= Marchiazza =

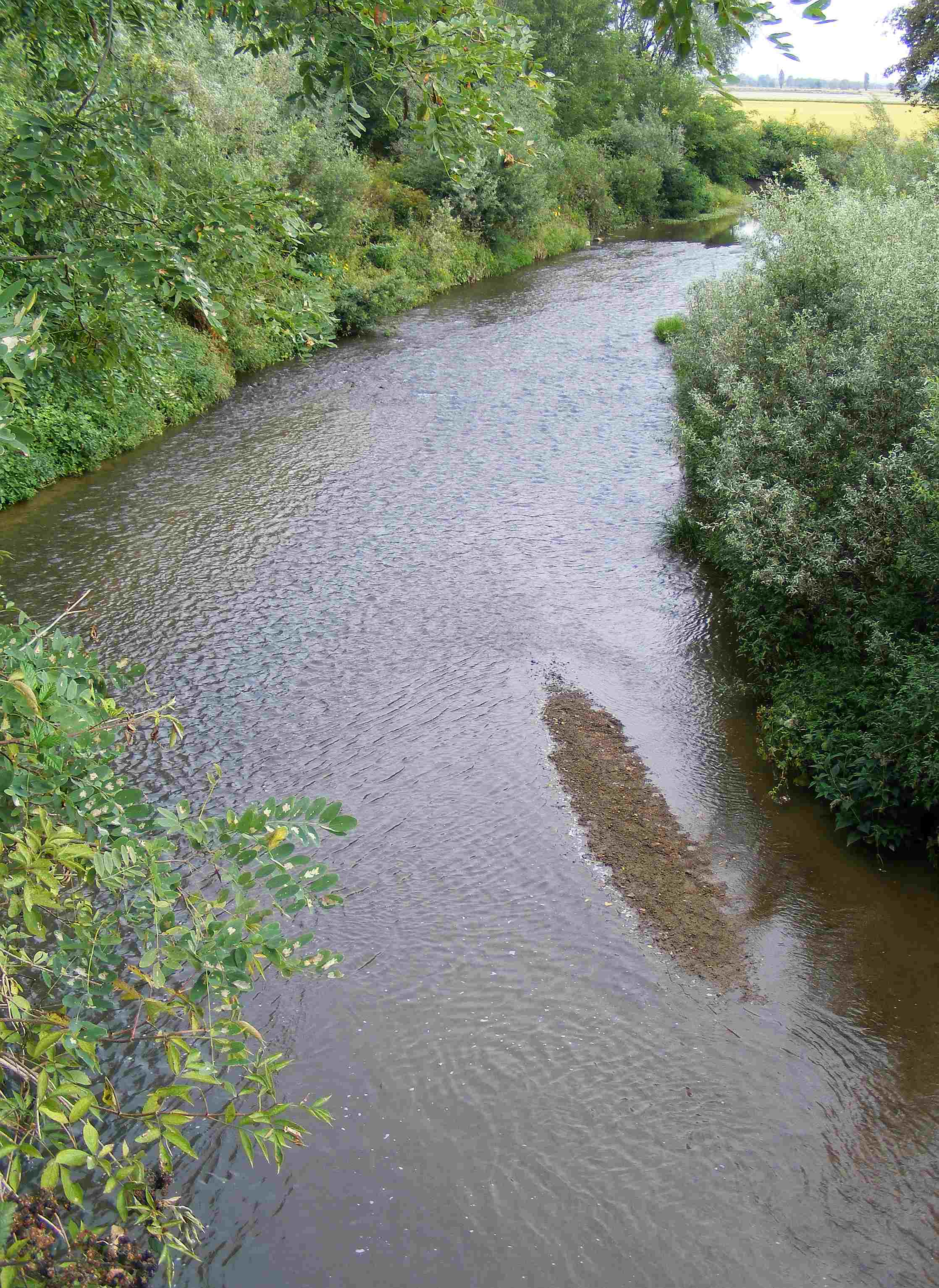
- The creek between Villarboit and Albano Vercellese

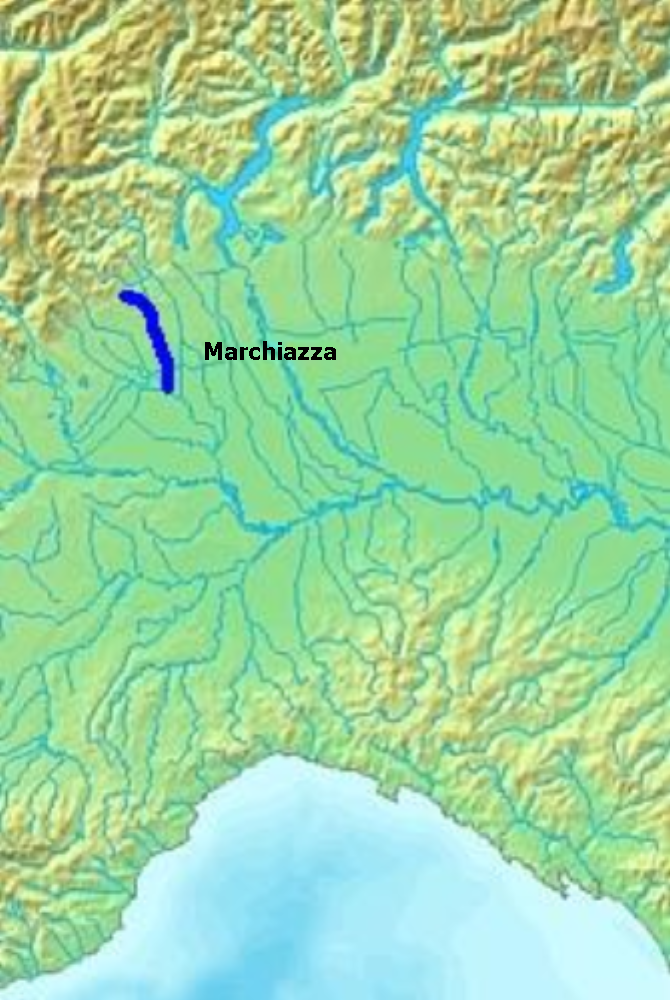
- Location within Po watershed

Location
- Country: Italy

Physical characteristics
- Source
  - location: near Cima Frascheja (Sostegno)
  - elevation: 600 m (2,000 ft)
- Mouth
  - location: Cervo near Collobiano
  - coordinates: 45°23′37″N 8°21′58″E
- Length: 34 km (21 mi)
- Basin size: 118 km^{2} (46 sq mi)
- Discharge
  - average: 2.4 m^{3}/s (85 cu ft/s)

Basin features
- Progression: Cervo→ Sesia→ Po→ Adriatic Sea

The Marchiazza is a 34 km long stream (torrente) of Piedmont, in north-western Italy. It is a left side tributary of the Cervo which flows through the provinces of Biella and Vercelli.

== Geography ==
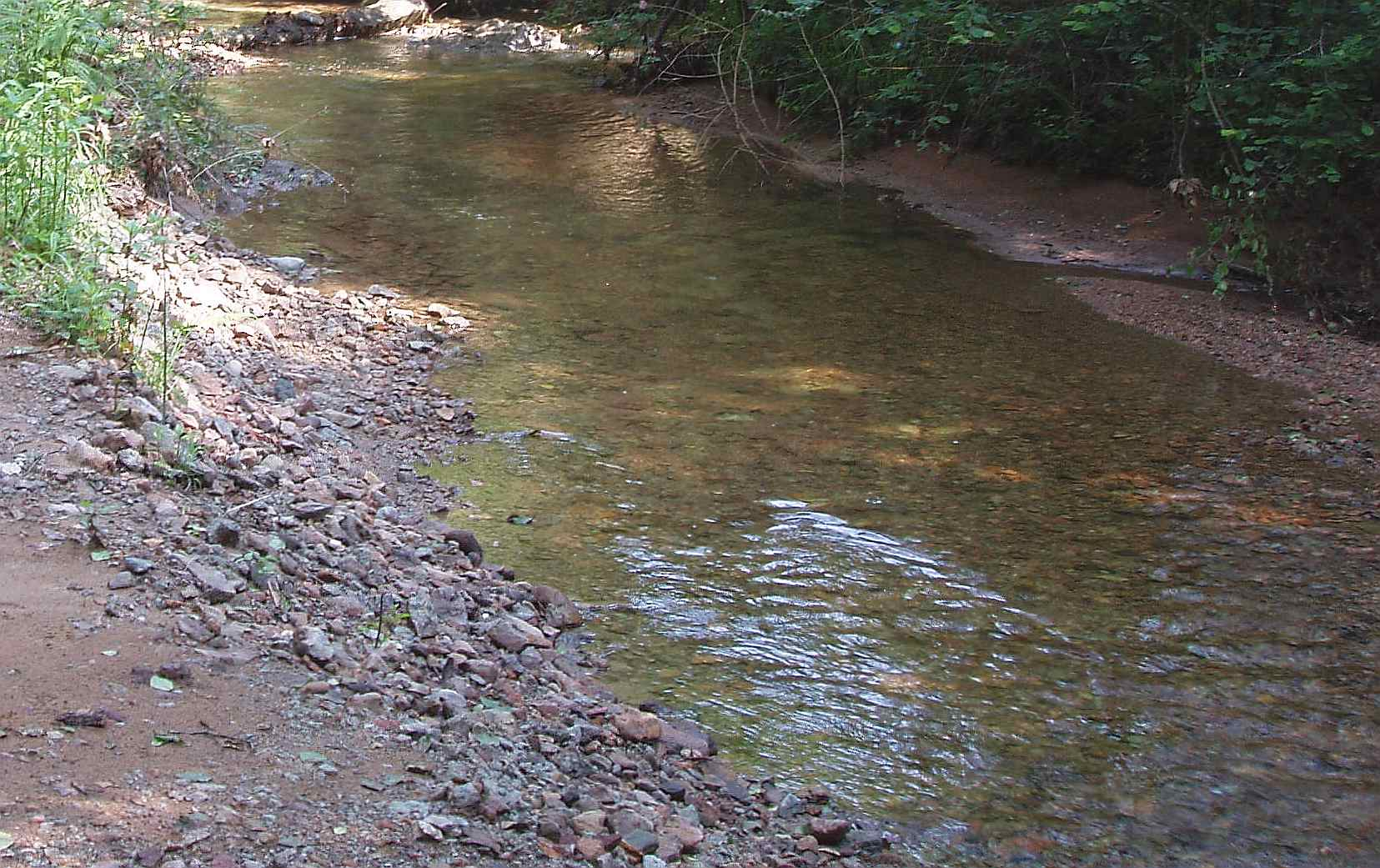
The Marchiazza near Lozzolo

The Marchiazza is formed in the eastern and hilly part of the Alpi Biellesi from the confluence of several streams; the longest of them is named Rio della Moja and has its source on the southern slopes of Cima Frascheja (625 m, municipality of Sostegno). The Marchiazza flows close to the village of Lozzolo and comes out of the hills entering the Po plain. In the territory of Gattinara it receives the waters of its mail natural tributary named Rio della Marchiazzola. Heading south in crosses the Baraggia heathland and then the paddy fields of the province of Vercelli. Between Albano Vercellese and Villarboit the Marchiazza is overpassed by Canale Cavour (one of the main irrigation canals in Italy) through a water bridge. In its lowest course the stream receives the waters of several small canals and part of its water is diverted for irrigation purposes. Near Collobiano the Marchiazza end its course flowing into the river Cervo at 136,7 matres s.l.m.

== See also ==
- Alpi Biellesi
