= Rovasenda (stream) =

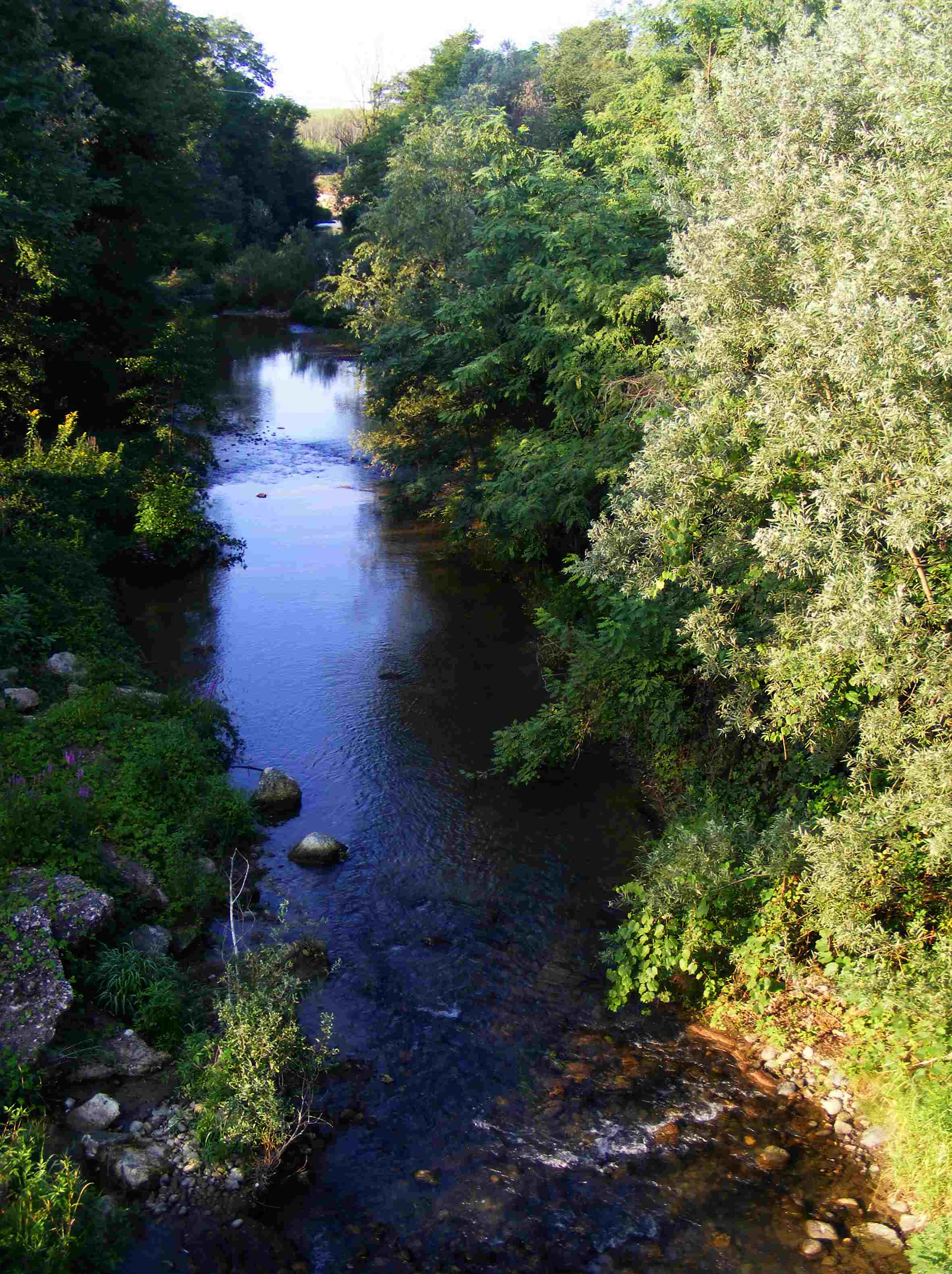
- The stream near the town of Rovasenda

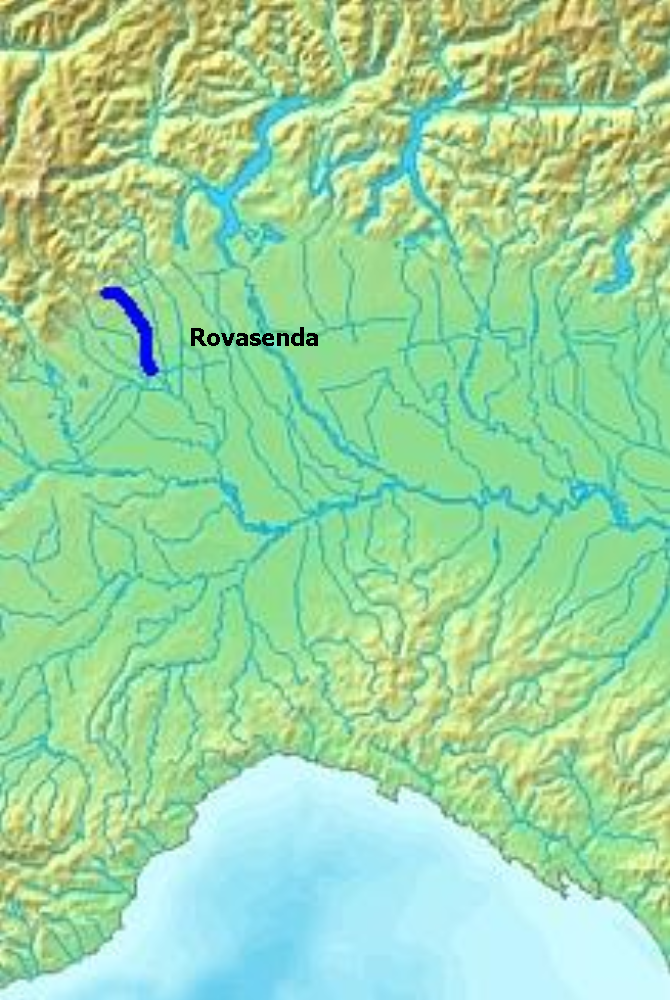
- Location within Po watershed

Location
- Country: Italy

Physical characteristics
- Source
  - location: Colle Sant'Emiliano (Sostegno)
  - elevation: 550 m (1,800 ft)
- Mouth
  - location: Cervo near Collobiano
  - coordinates: 45°24′27″N 8°20′37″E
- Length: 37.8 km (23.5 mi)
- Basin size: 149 km^{2} (58 sq mi)
- Discharge
  - average: 2.9 m^{3}/s (100 cu ft/s)

Basin features
- Progression: Cervo→ Sesia→ Po→ Adriatic Sea

The Rovasenda is a 38 km long stream (torrente) of Piedmont, in north-western Italy. It'is a left side tributary of the Cervo which flows through the provinces of Biella and Vercelli.

== Geography ==
The Rovasenda is formed in the eastern and hilly part of the Alpi Biellesi from the confluence of three streams; Riale Ravasanella, Rio Valnava and Rio della Valle. The stream is initially named Torrente Giara and gets the name of Torrente Rovasenda near a town of the same name, Rovasenda. Heading south it crosses the Baraggia heathland and then the paddy fields of the province of Vercelli. Near Villarboit the Rovasenda is overpassed by Canale Cavour (one of the main irrigation canals in Italy) through a water bridge. In its lowest course the stream receives the waters of several small canals and part of its water is diverted for irrigation purposes. Not far from Collobiano the Rovasenda end its course flowing into the river Cervo at 141.1 matres s.l.m.

== See also ==
- Alpi Biellesi

== Other projects ==
Media related to Rovasenda (creek) at Wikimedia Commons
