= Lago delle Piane =

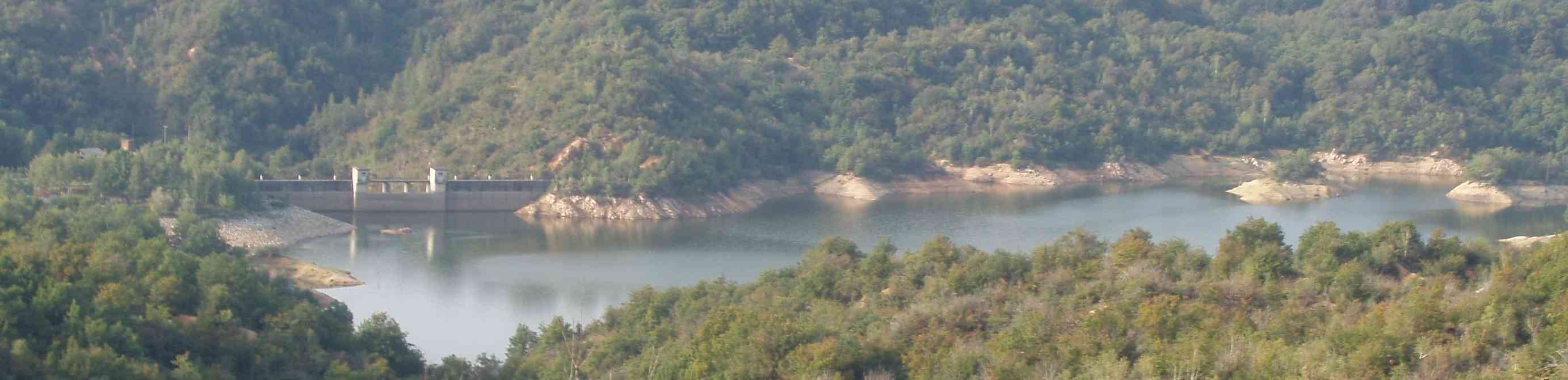

- Location within Piedmont
- Location: Province of Biella, Piedmont
- Coordinates: 45°36′42″N 8°12′53″E
- Type: reservoir
- Primary inflows: Torrente Ostola, Torrente Cigliaga, Riale della Caudana
- Primary outflows: Torrente Ostola
- Basin countries: Italy
- Surface area: 0.427 km^{2} (0.165 sq mi)
- Surface elevation: 325 m (1,066 ft)

Lago delle Piane is a lake in the Province of Biella, Piedmont, Italy. At an elevation of 325 m, its surface area is 0.427 km^{2}.

== Bibliography ==
- Atlante dei laghi Piemontesi, Regione Piemonte – Direzione Pianificazione delle Risorse Idriche – 2003
