= Lago della Vecchia =

Lake in Italy

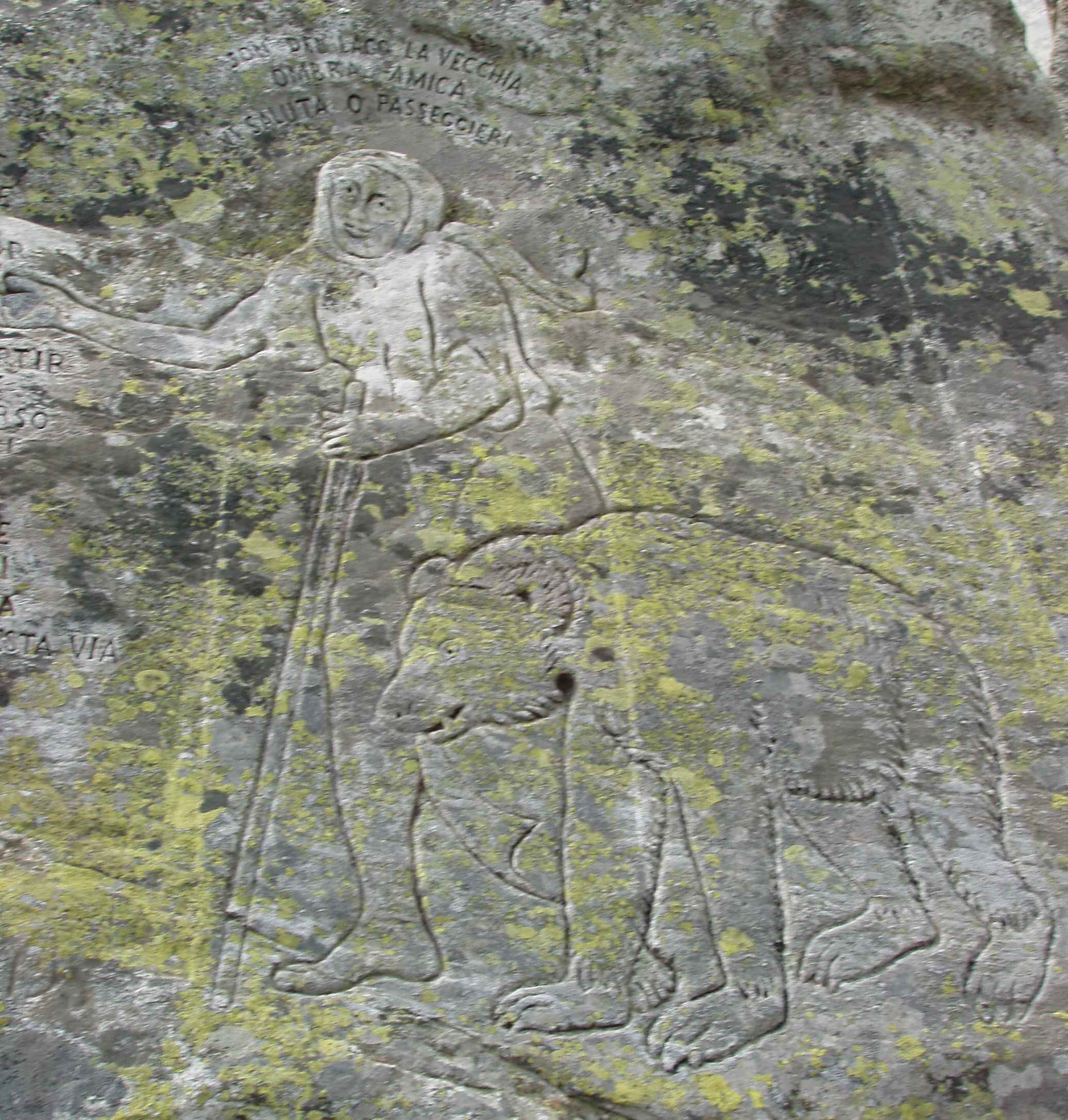
- The legendary Old Woman (’la Vecchia’) and her bear.

- Location within Piedmont
- Location: Province of Biella, Piedmont
- Coordinates: 45°41′23″N 7°54′51″E
- Primary outflows: Cervo
- Basin countries: Italy
- Surface area: 0.06448 km^{2} (0.02490 sq mi)
- Surface elevation: 1,865 m (6,119 ft)

Lago della Vecchia (French: Lac de la Vieille) is a lake in the Prealps of the Province of Biella in the Piedmont region of Italy. At an average elevation of 1,858 m, its surface area is 0.06448 km².
