= Santuario del Mazzucco =

Coordinates: 45.6450°N 8.0869°E

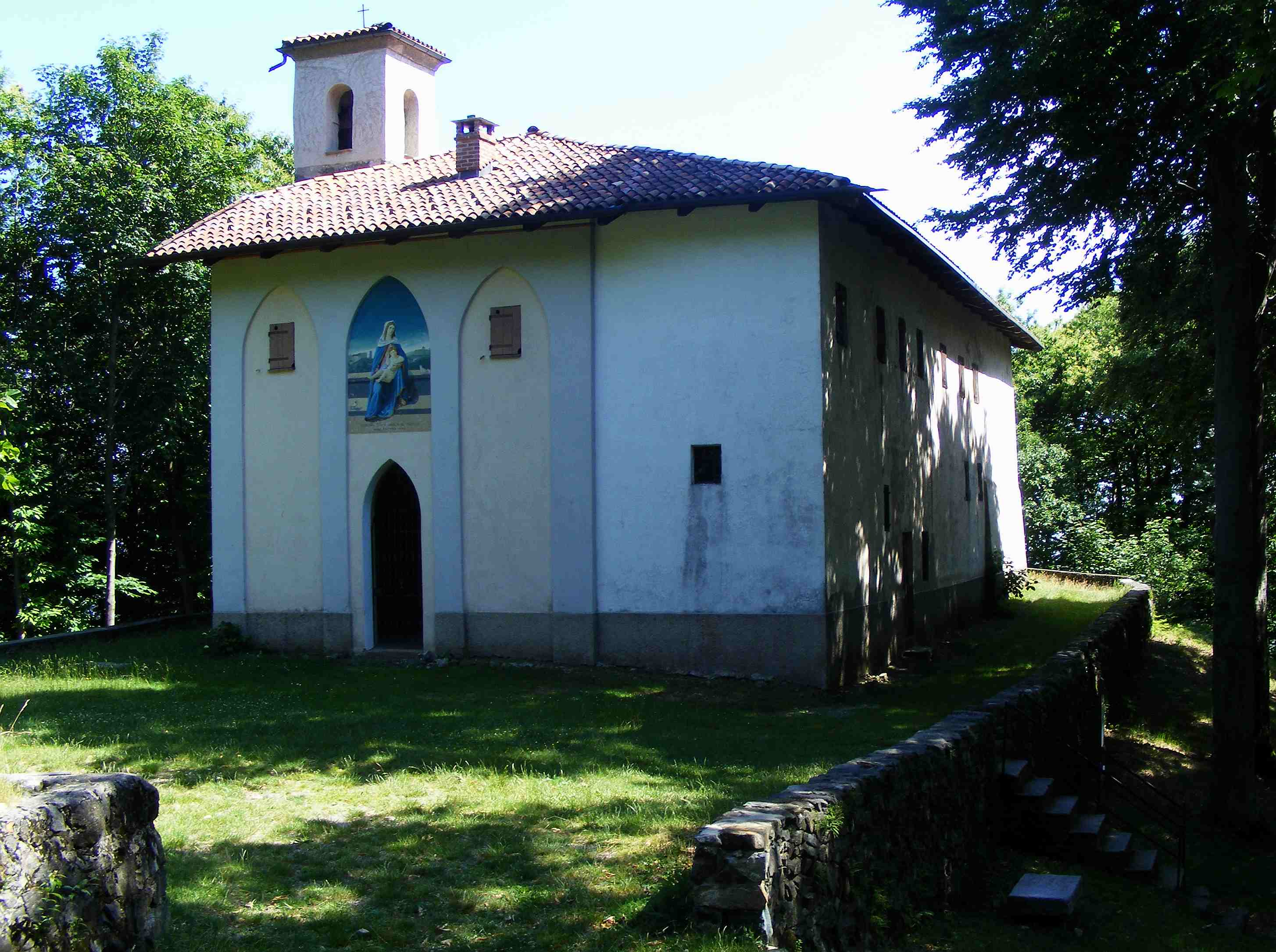
The sanctuary

The Mazzucco Sanctuary (Italian santuario del Mazzucco) is a sanctuary devoted to Saint Anne, the Virgin Mary and Bernard of Menthon.

Together with the Banchette Sanctuary (Bioglio), the Brughiera sanctuary (Trivero) and the Brugarola sanctuary (Ailoche), it is one of the minor sanctuaries of the Biellese territory, all connected by the ways CoEur - In the heart of European paths and Path of Saint Charles.

== Characteristics ==
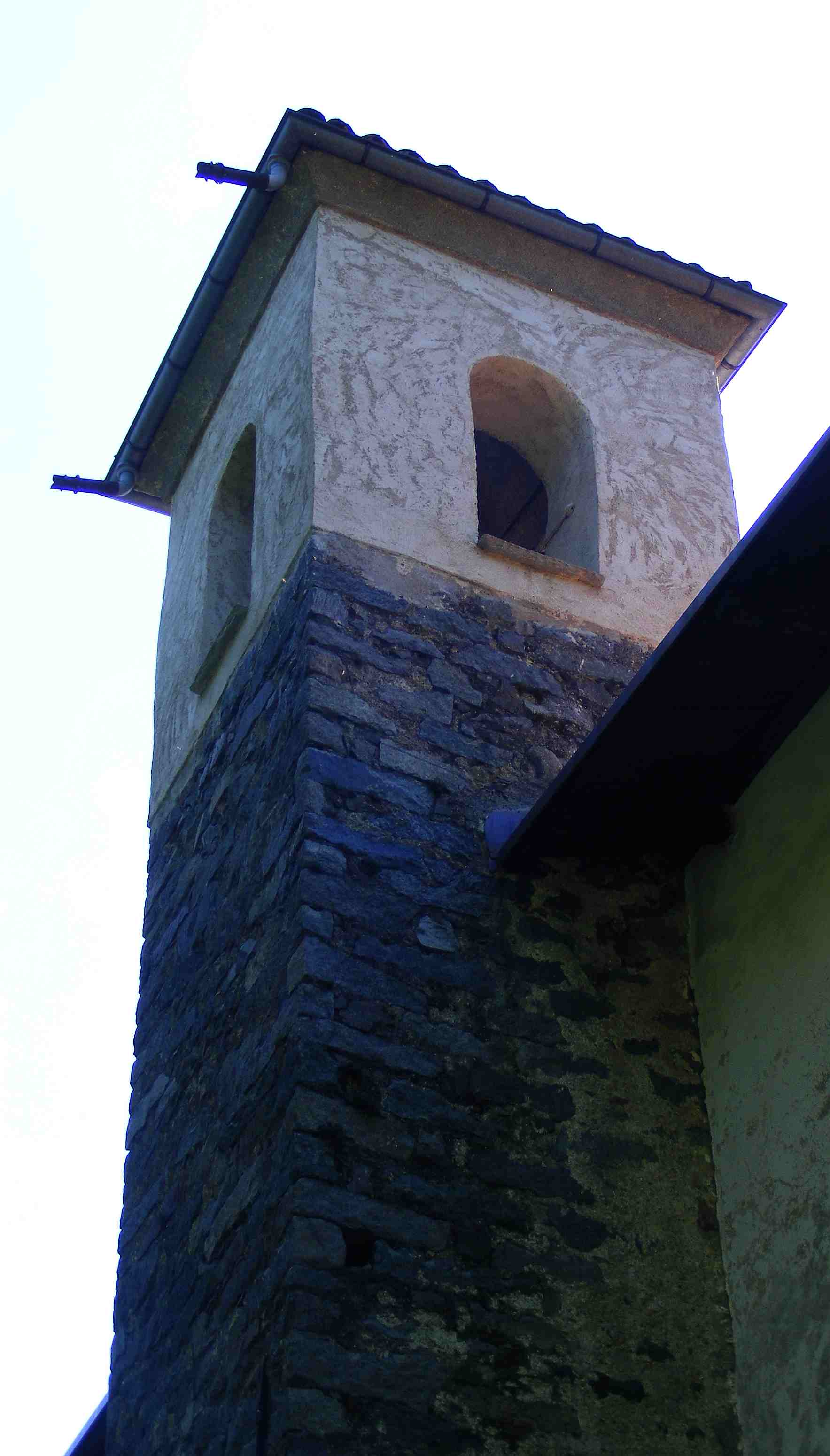
The belltower

The sanctuary is in a beechwood at 919 m altitude in the Camandona municipality.

The building has one aisle and a small belltower and was built in 1662. In the 18th century a portico was added to the façade, above which a hermit lived. The structure was modified during the 19th and 20th centuries.

The main altarpiece is a canvas depicting Saint Anne by Carlo Sogno (1900); the other paintings were made by local artists. The façade was frescoed in 1988 with a representation of the Virgin Mary and baby Jesus.

Since its foundation this small sanctuary was inhabited by hermits, from the mid-1700s to 1901, when the last hermit died.

The area is surrounded by beeches. In front of the sanctuary there is a fountain, like in all the others sanctuaries of the Biellese territory.

== See also ==
- CoEur - In the heart of European paths
- Path of Saint Charles
