= Pianceri =

- Frazione
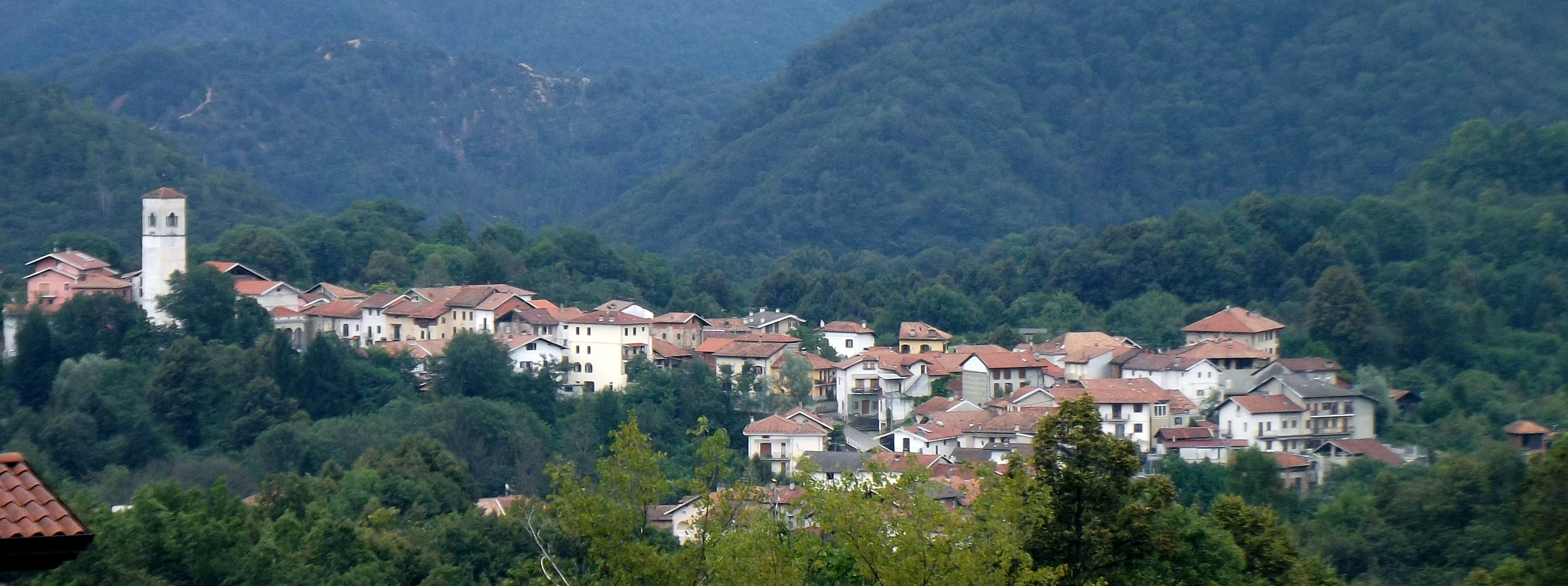
- Panorama from Fervazzo (Coggiola).

- Location of Pianceri in Italy
- Coordinates: 45°40′54″N 8°13′04″E
- Country: Italy
- Region: Piedmont
- Province: Biella (BI)
- Comune: Pray
- Elevation: 520 m (1,710 ft)

Population (2001)
  - Total: 477
- Time zone: UTC+1 (CET)
  - Summer (DST): UTC+2 (CEST)
- Postal code: 13867
- Dialing code: (+39) 015

Pianceri is a frazione (and a parish) of the municipality of Pray, in Piedmont, northern Italy.

== Name ==
In former times the village was named Planum ad Cerreta.

== History ==
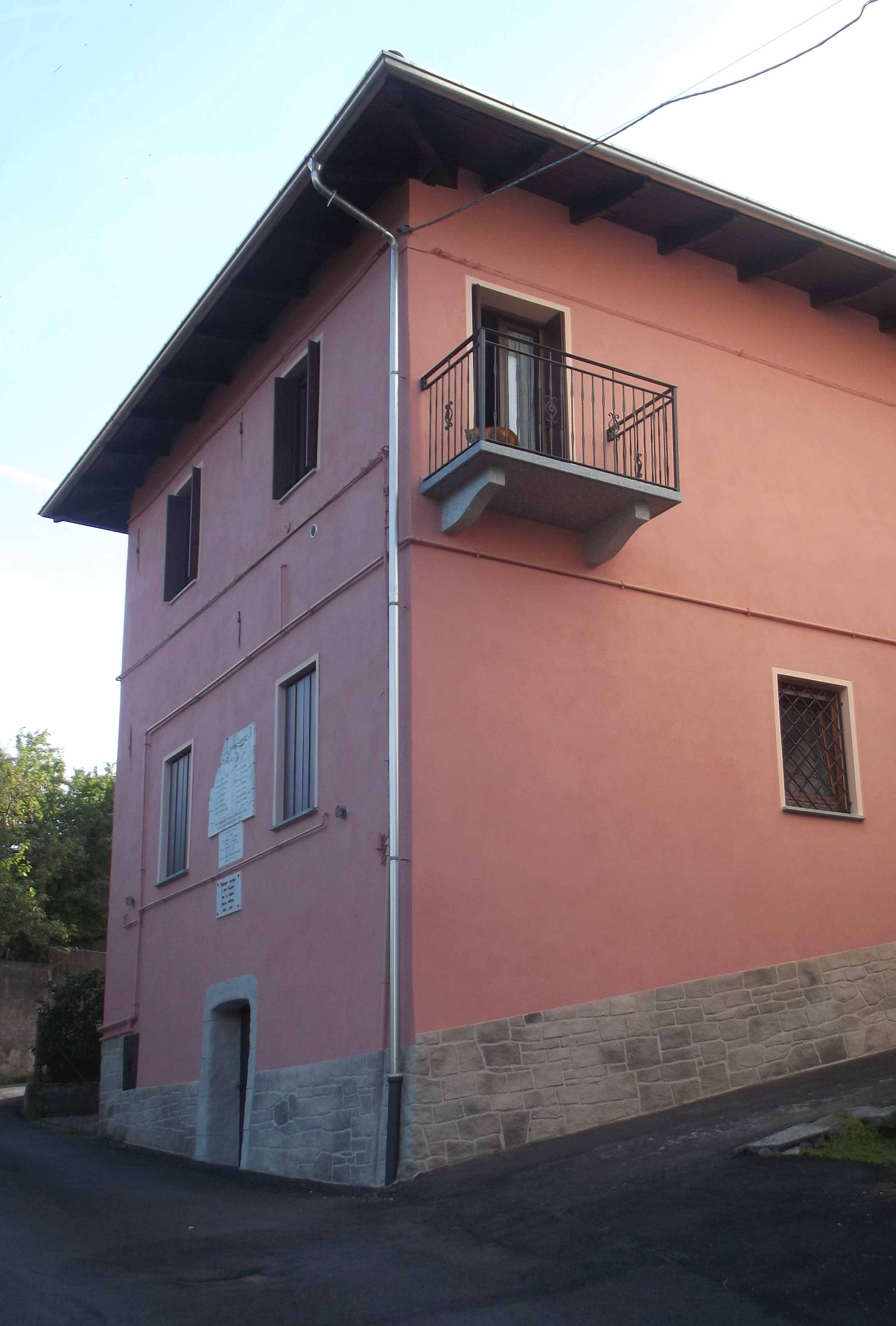
Former town hall

The first permanently inhabited groups of houses in the Pianceri area go back up to 1100.

The local parish of San Grato was established in 1629. From 1736 to 1928 Pianceri has been a separate comune (municipality).

== Relevant buildings ==
- Oratorio del Guarnero: after a fire which almost destroyed it the church was rebuilt between 1691 and 1733. Its crypt was frescoed in the early 16th century.
- San Grato: it became an independent parish church in 1629. Built in 1620 in a baroque style by Antonio Gilardi di Campertogno, it was completed between 1756 and 1845.
