= Santuario dei Moglietti =

Coordinates: 45.6936°N 8.1983°E

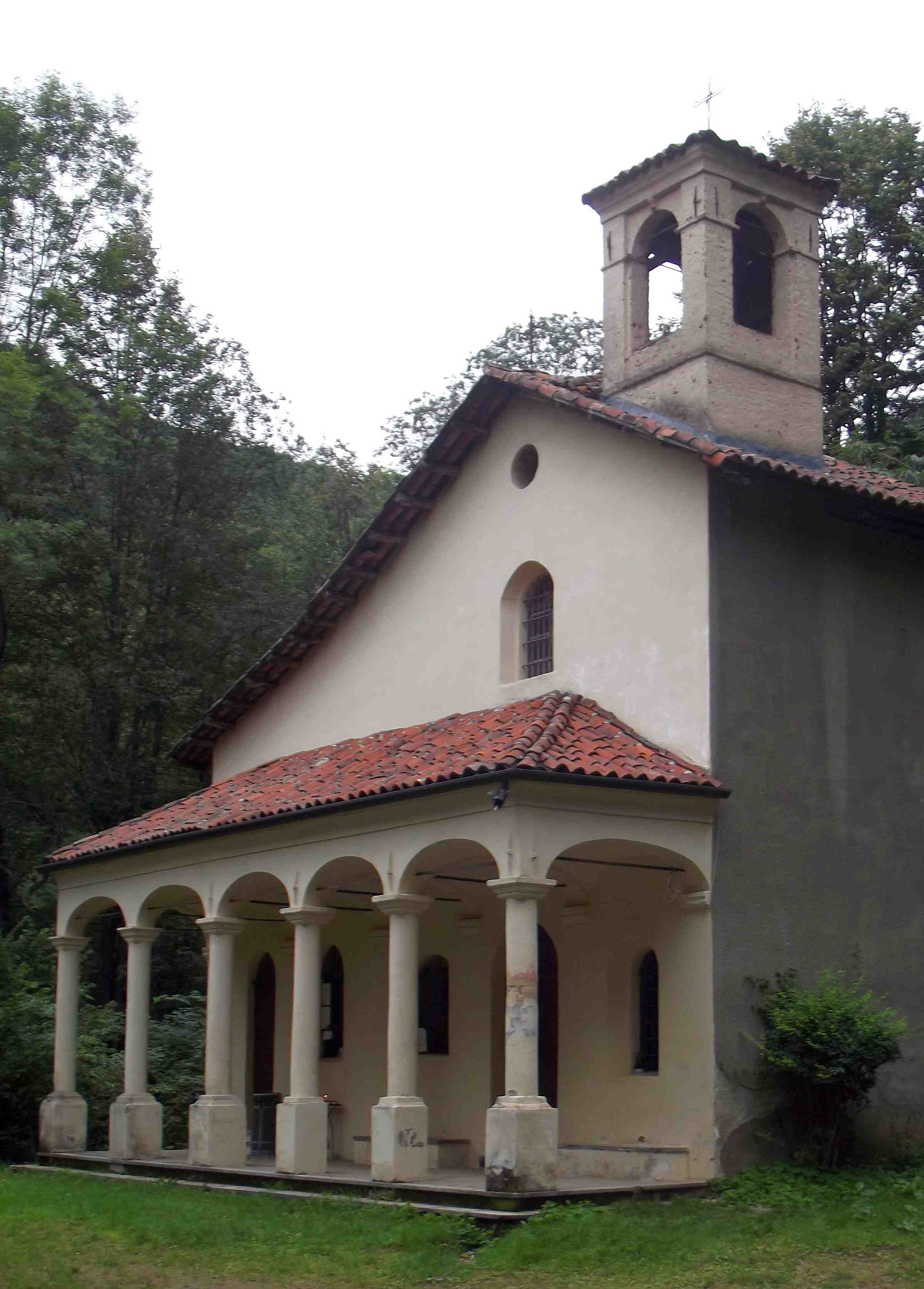
The sanctuary

The Moglietti sanctuary (Italian: Santuario dei Moglietti) is a sanctuary devoted to Our Lady of Graces in the comune of Coggiola.

== History ==
The sanctuary was built from 1888 enlarging an ancient chapel dating back to the 18th century.

The site once was a wetland and the name Moglietti (from the local expression muijeit, swamp) remembers the past ambient. The place is also known as the battlefield because, according to the local tradition, there has been a battle between the citizen of Coggiola and Fra Dolcino and his fellows.

== Description ==
Today the sanctuary is composed by a small church, with apse, portico, belltower, and a small hostel. The ancient votive column with the fresco of the Virgin Mary with baby Jesus is still preserved in the church. In front of the sanctuary there is the characteristic fountain that can be found in every sanctuary in the Biellese territory.

Inside the church are exposed the many Ex voto donated by the devotees.

== Bibliography ==
- Museo Borgogna (1976). Tip. torinese (ed.). Opere d'arte a Vercelli e nella sua provincia: recuperi e restauri 1968-1976 : catalogo della mostra : Vercelli, Museo Borgogna, Varallo, Pinacoteca, San Marco, Santa Maria delle Grazie, Sacro Monte, Biella, Museo civico, San Sebastiano : giugno-settembre 1976. p. 251.
- Gabriella Giovannacci Amodeo (1994). Libreria editrice Vittorio Giovannacci (ed.). Nuova guida di Biella e provincia. p. 368.
- AA.VV. (2005). Nerosubianco editore (ed.). Comuni della provincia di Biella. Cuneo. p. 49.
- Giulio Pavignano (2005). Edizioni Ieri e oggi (ed.). I santuari del Biellese - Fede, storia e tradizioni. Fotografie Gianfranco Bini e Giuseppe Simonetti. Biella.

== See also ==
- CoEur - In the heart of European paths
- Path of Saint Charles
