= Festa della Santissima Pietà =

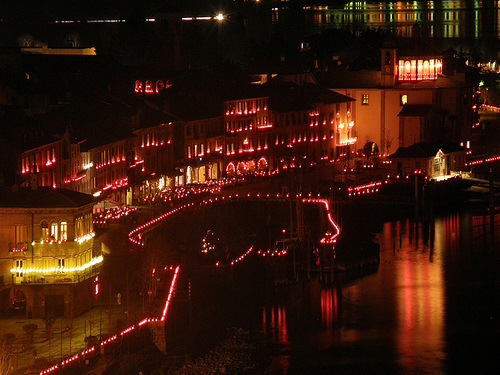
The central square of Cannobio illuminated for the feast

The Holy Piety feast (Italian festa della Santissima Pietà or festa dei Lumineri or festa dei lumieri) is a catholic feast celebrated on 7 January evening in Cannobio. It has been celebrated for 500 years as of 2022.

== The ritual ==
The ritual consist in lowering a shrine containing a rib of Jesus Christ (called "the Sacred Rib") which is kissed by the devotees and carried around the streets as far as the Santuario della Santissima Pietà.

== The legend originating the feast ==
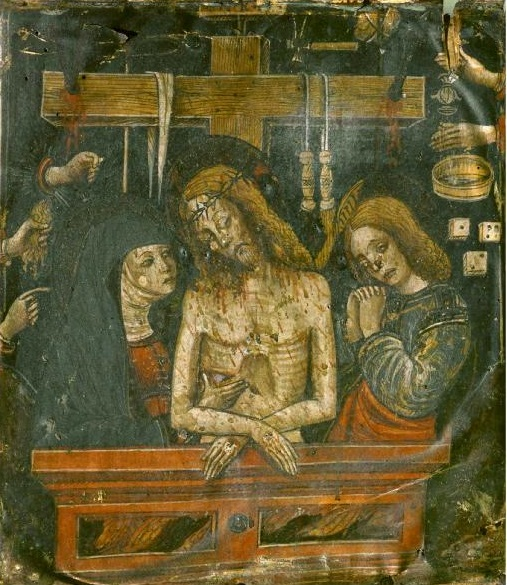
The holy image of Cannobio

According to the legend, in Cannobio on 8, 9, 10, and 28 January 1522 in Tommaso Zaccheo's inn occurred miracles.

A waitress, gone upstairs to take clean sheets, noticed that the little painting of the Man of Sorrows, representing Jesus between the Virgin Mary and Saint John, was bleeding. The day after a little bleeding rib, proportionate to the painted Christ, was found under the painting.

The Sacred Rib was preserved in a goblet and carried to the church of San Vittore, where it is still preserved in a precious shrine donated by Federico Borromeo in 1605.

The inn was than demolished in order to allow the building of the majestic sanctuary, whose constriction was supported by Charles Borromeo, that today still preserve the painting and the bloodstained sheets.

== The feast ==
The secular part of the feast is the illumination of the town with candles. Every inhabitant put a candle on the windowsill and even the boats on the lakefront have candles.

There is also a culinary part of the celebration. After the procession the devotees traditionally eat pasta e fagioli and luganega, a beef sausage with garlic prepared with potatoes and sauerkraut.

== See also ==
- CoEur - In the heart of European paths
- Path of Saint Charles
