= Santuario del Cavallero =

Coordinates: 45.7006°N 8.1600°E

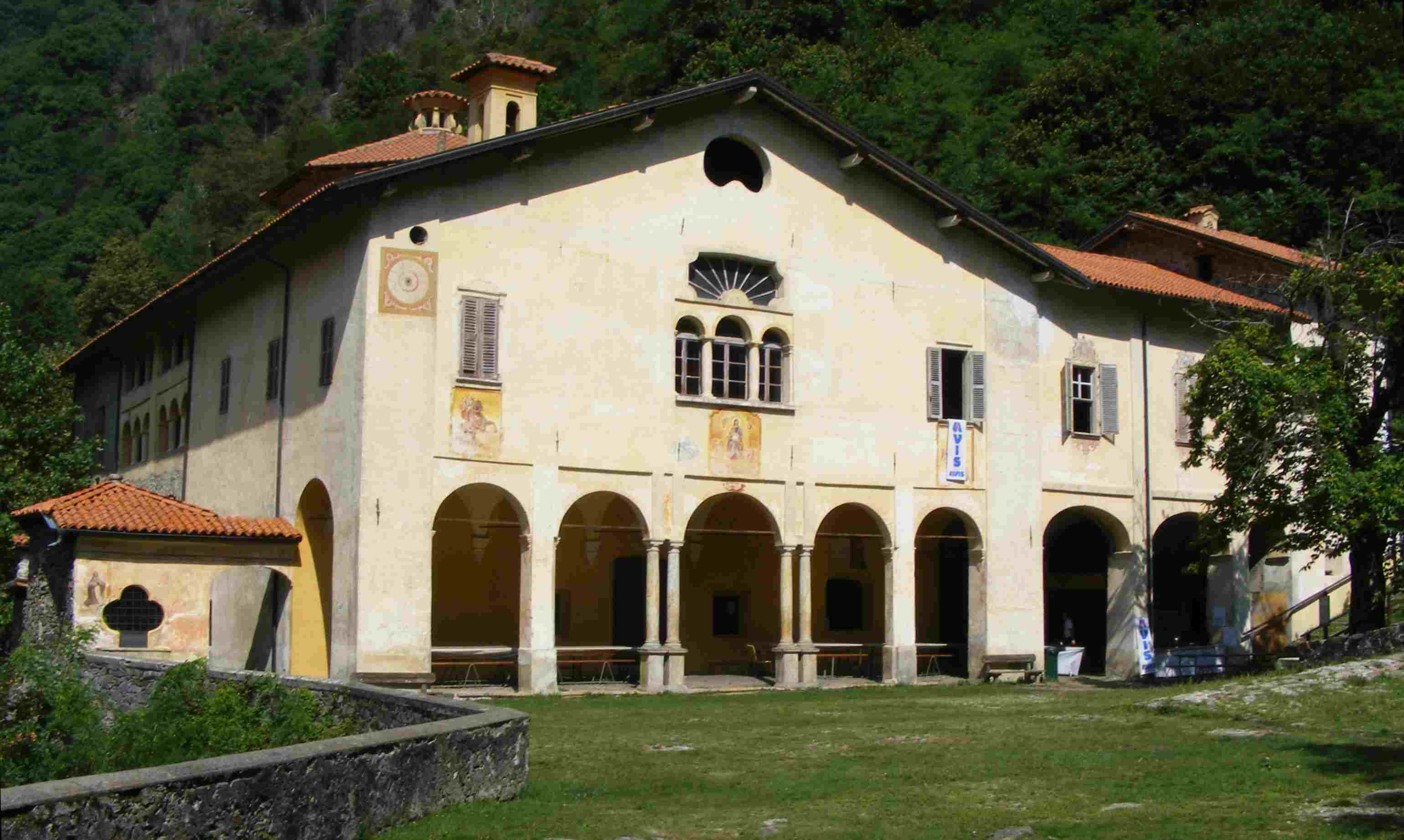
The sanctuary

The Cavallero sanctuary (Italian santuario del Cavallero) devoted to Saint Mary of the Snow. It is set at 543 m height near the Sessera river in the municipality of Coggiola.

== Description ==
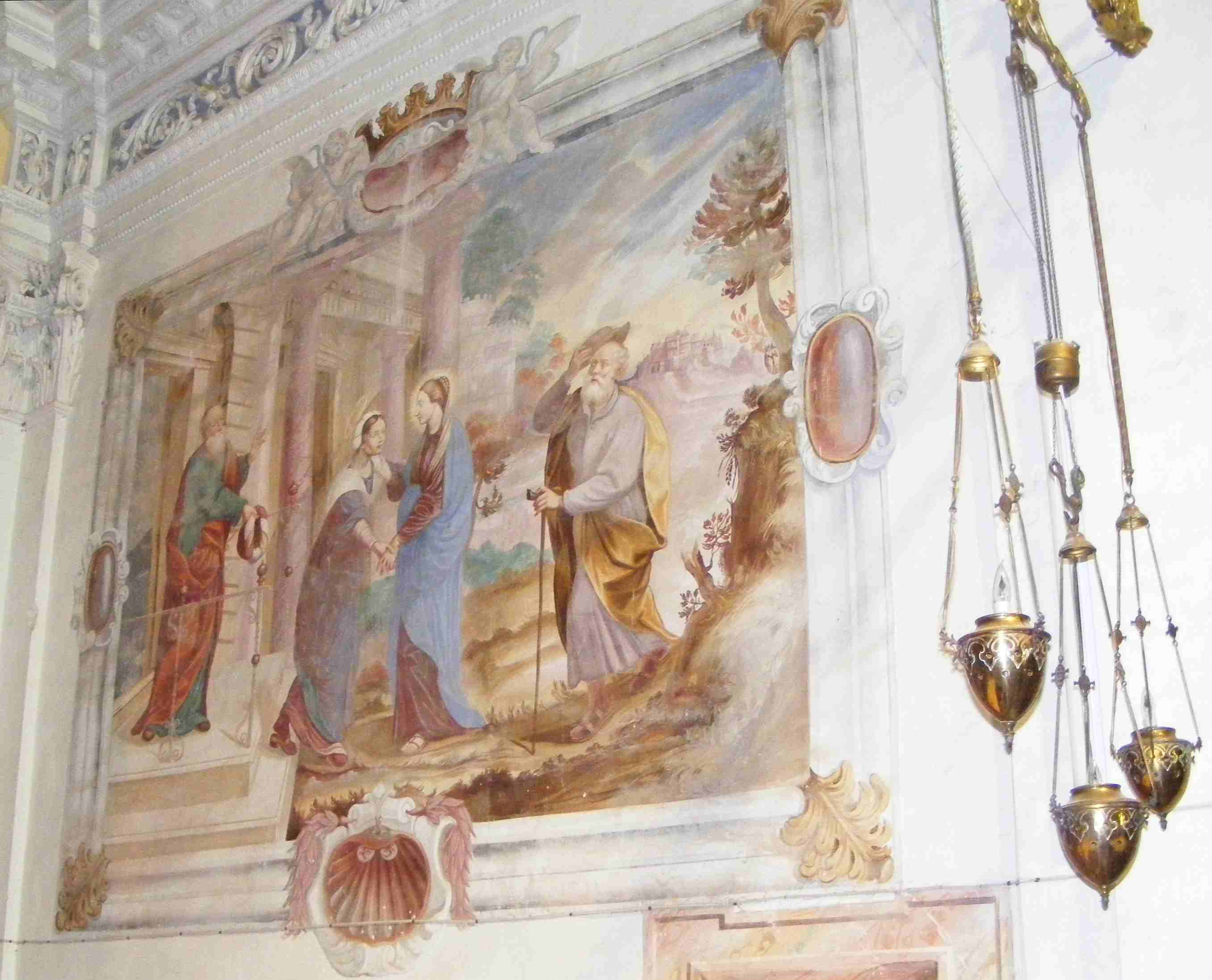
Fresco of the presbitery

The building of the sanctuary is due to the miraculous healing of a deaf-mute country girl thanks to the vision of Saint Mary of the Snow in 1678.

The church has a Christian cross map and is decorated with stuccos and frescos by Pietro Lace, painter from Andorno Micca. The building preserves around 300 Ex voto.

The complex includes also few chapels and the lodging of the hermits, to whom the custody of the sanctuary was assigned until the 19th century. The bridge over the Rio Cavallero, completed in 1772, is so wide that is generally considered a real square.

According to the tradition the water pouring from the fountain has healing properties.

Together with the Novareia sanctuary nearby and the other sanctuaries in the area it is part of the minor sanctuaries of the Biellese territory, all connected by CoEur - In the heart of European paths and Path of Saint Charles.

== The Sacro Monte ==
Near the church there are five chapels, built between 1710 and 1716, decorated with terracotta statues, like the contemporary Sacri Monti in Piedmont and Lombardy.

== See also ==
- CoEur - In the heart of European paths
- Path of Saint Charles
