= Banchette Sanctuary =

Coordinates: 45°37′17.93″N 8°6′52.23″E

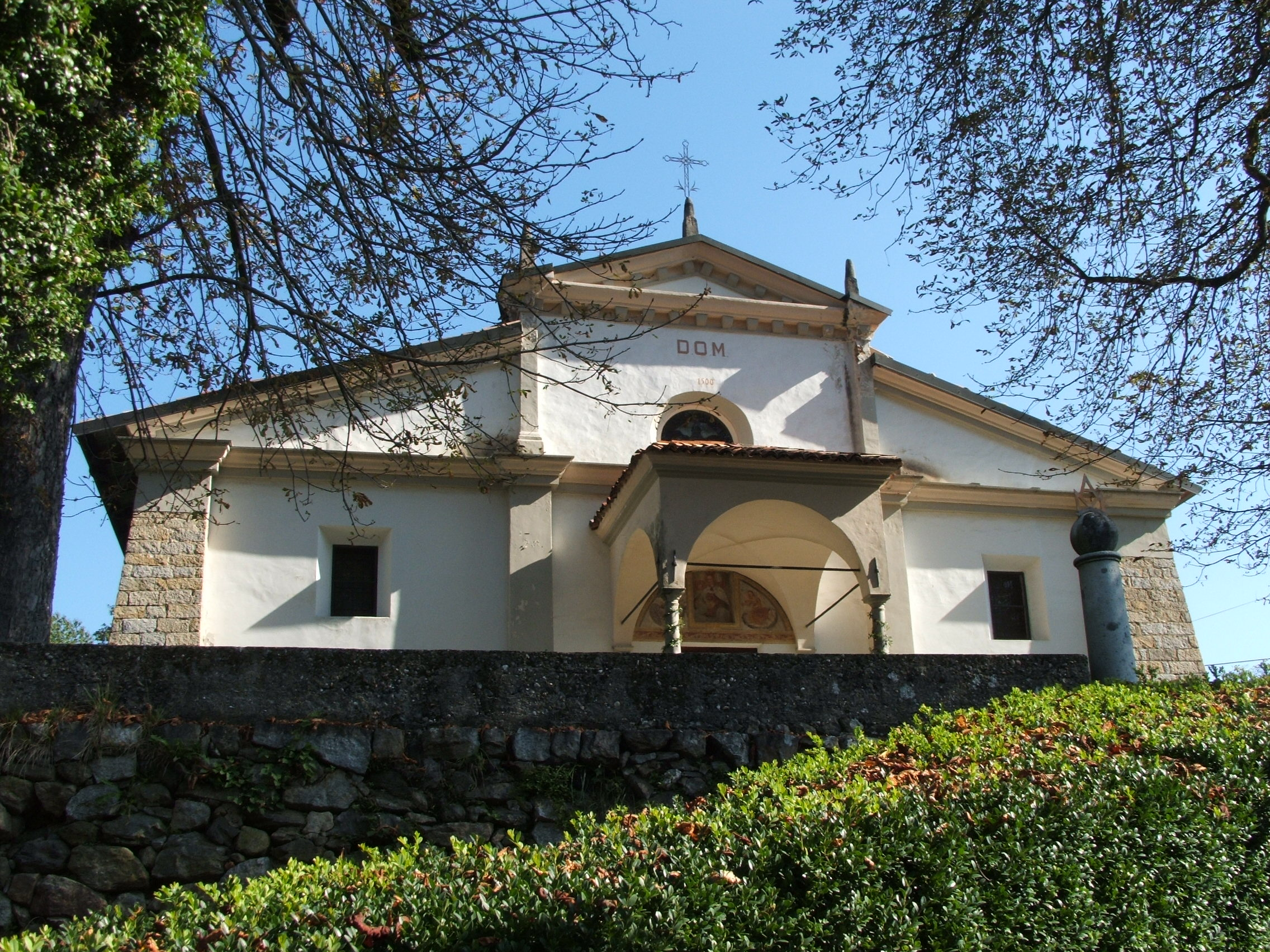
The sanctuary

The Banchette sanctuary (Italian santuario di Banchette) devoted to the Virgin Mary situated in the Banchette hamlet, in the comune of Bioglio, near the village of Pettinengo.

Together with the Brugarola sanctuary in Ailoche, the Mazzucco Sanctuary in Camandona and the Brughiera sanctuary in Trivero it is one of the minor sanctuaries of the Biellese territory, all connected by the ways CoEur - In the heart of European paths and Path of Saint Charles.

It is built at 675 m altitude and it is an extradiocesan sanctuary run by Barnabites. Behind the church there is a building, dating to the first half of the 18th century, destined to the pilgrims. This hostel was built thanks to the donation of a Spanish military officer.

According to the legend, the sanctuary was built in order to remedy to the profanation of the fresco of the Virgin Mary perpetrated by a fool who threw stones against the image painted on a column. This gesture origined the surname of Madonna dal bull, the Virgin with a bruise. The ruined fresco is still visible today inside the church.

The actual building has been erected by the Barnabites around the ancient church which was used as leper hospital in 1630 during a plague.

The structure has been restored at the beginning of the 20th century. The parts of the original church are the façade and part of the lateral aisles.

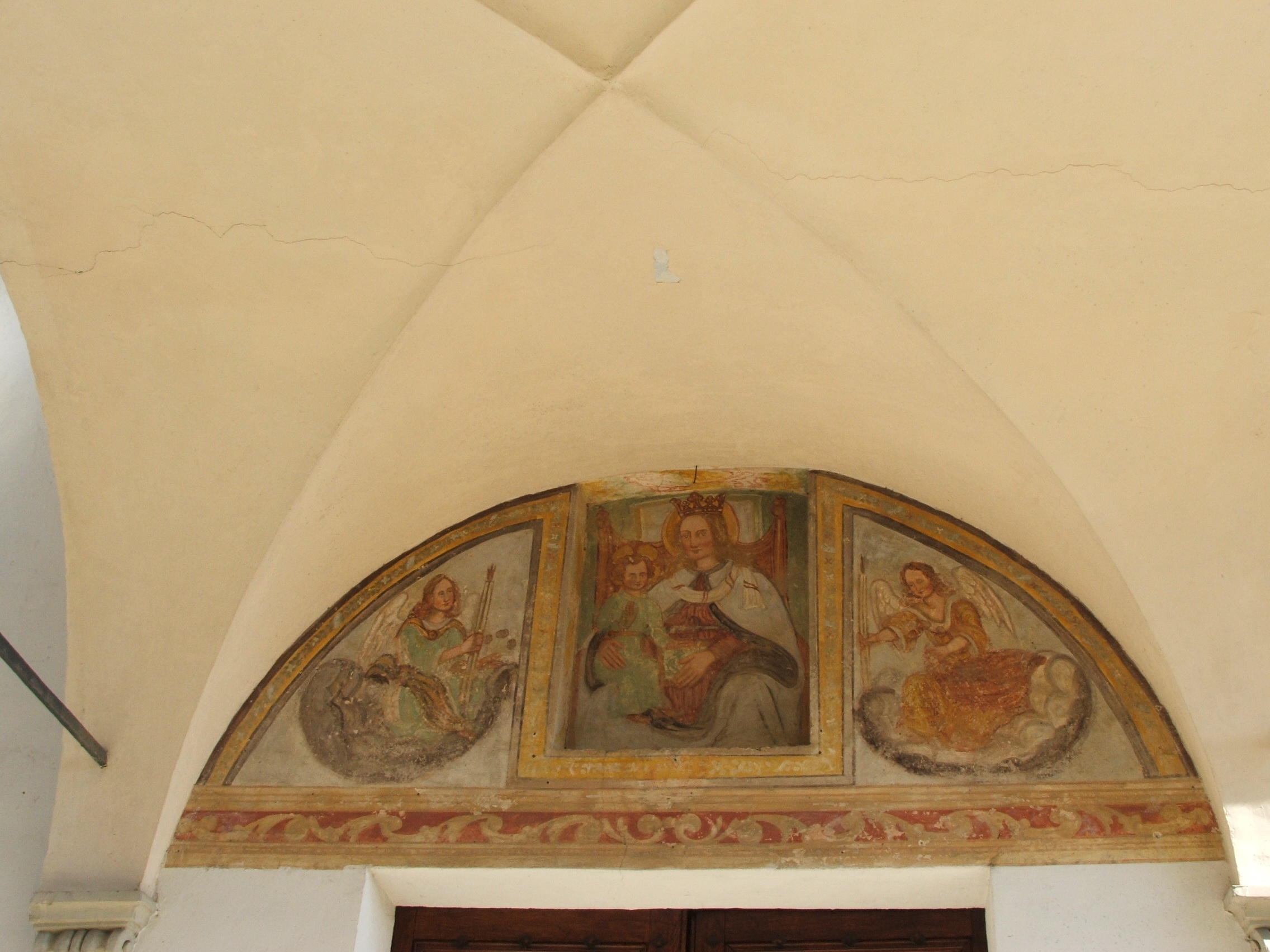
Porch frescos

== See also ==
- CoEur - In the heart of European paths
- Path of Saint Charles
