= Portula =

Portula Pörtula
- Comune
- Comune di Portula
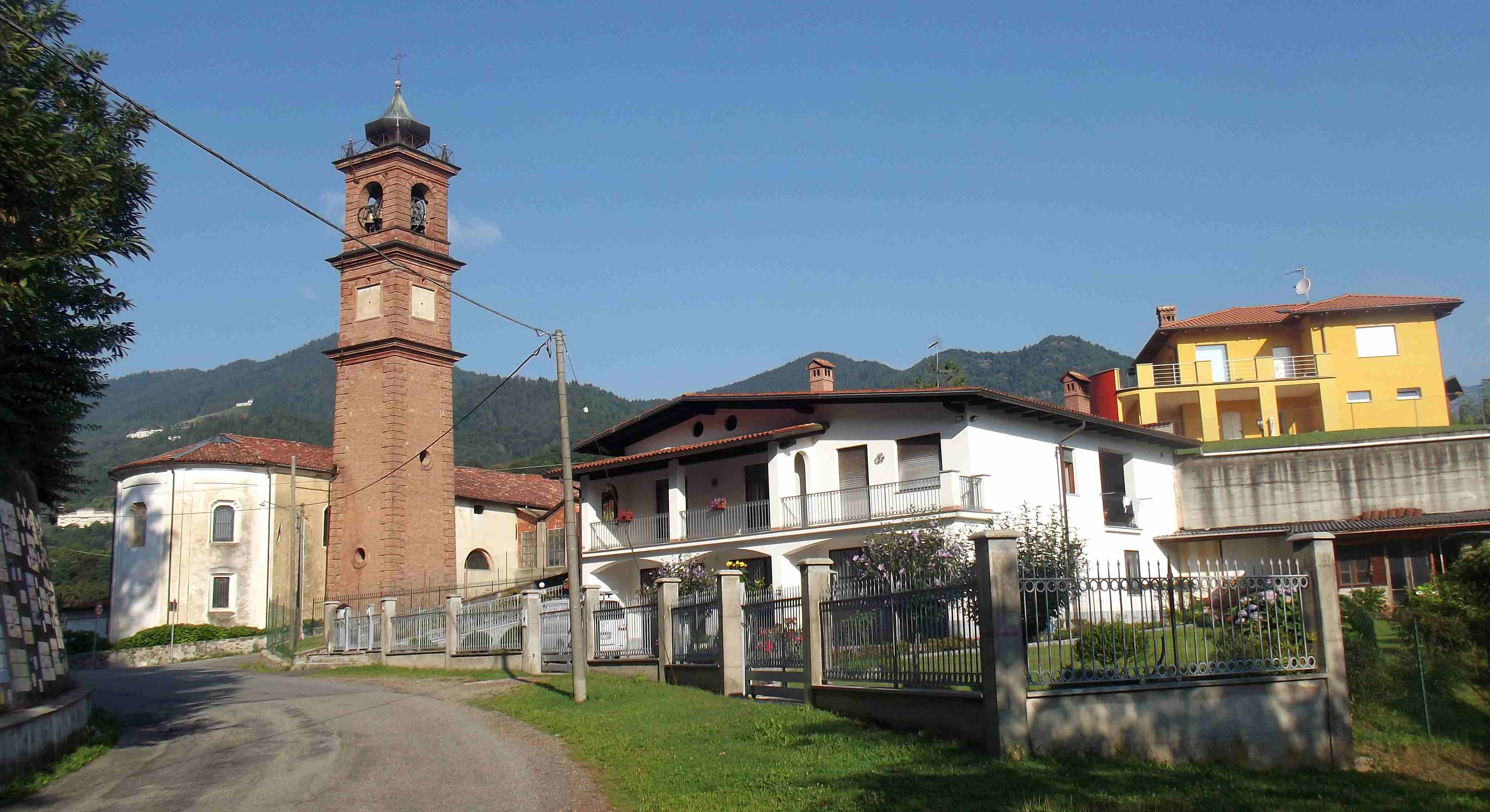
- View of Portula

- Location within Italy Location within Piedmont
- Coordinates: 45°40′N 8°11′E
- Country: Italy
- Region: Piedmont
- Province: Province of Biella (BI)

Area
  - Total: 11.1 km^{2} (4.3 sq mi)

Population (Dec. 2004)
  - Total: 1,505
  - Density: 136/km^{2} (351/sq mi)
- Time zone: UTC+1 (CET)
  - Summer (DST): UTC+2 (CEST)
- Postal code: 13050
- Dialing code: 015

Portula is a comune (municipality) in the Province of Biella in the Italian region Piedmont, located about 80 kilometres (50 mi) northeast of Turin and about 14 kilometres (9 mi) northeast of Biella. As of 31 December 2004, it had a population of 1,505 and an area of 11.1 square kilometres (4.3 mi^{2}).

One of the most important monuments in its territory is the Novareia sanctuary.

Portula borders the following municipalities: Caprile, Coggiola, Pray, Trivero.

== Population history ==
Historical population

Year	Pop.	±%
1861	1,885	—
1871	1,957	+3.8%
1881	2,241	+14.5%
1901	2,087	−6.9%
1911	1,898	−9.1%

Year	Pop.	±%
1921	1,910	+0.6%
1931	2,375	+24.3%
1936	2,401	+1.1%
1951	2,662	+10.9%
1961	2,632	−1.1%

Year	Pop.	±%
1971	2,280	−13.4%
1981	1,944	−14.7%
1991	1,651	−15.1%
2001	1,486	−10.0%

Source: Data from ISTAT
