= Flecchia =

- Frazione
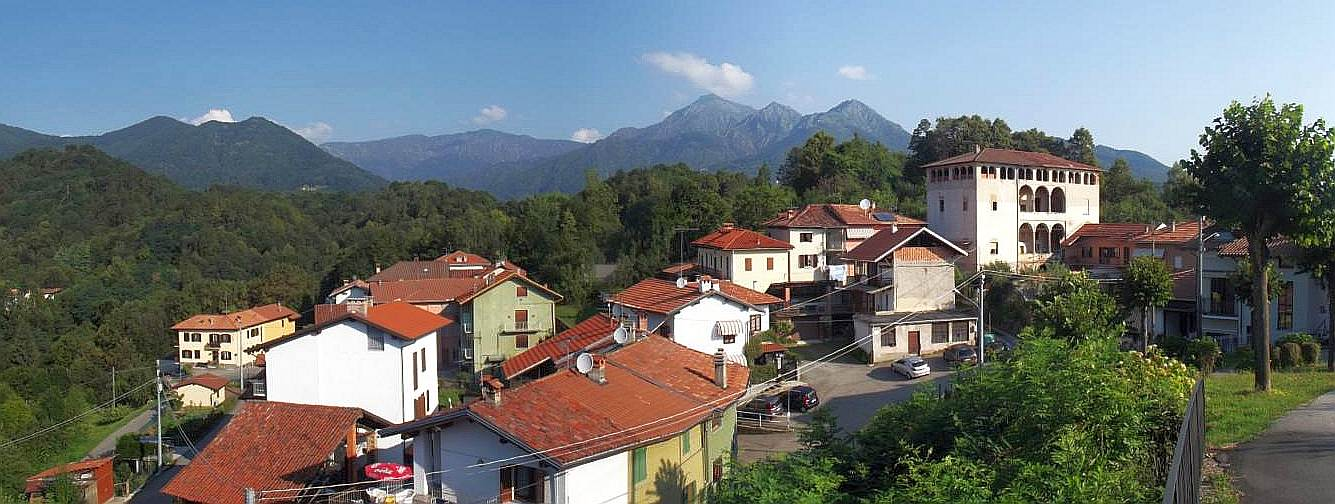
- Panorama from the parish church, the monte Barone in the background

- Location of Flecchia in Italy
- Coordinates: 45°40′15″N 8°11′37″E
- Country: Italy
- Region: Piedmont
- Province: Biella (BI)
- Comune: Pray
- Elevation: 582 m (1,909 ft)

Population (2001)
  - Total: 194
- Time zone: UTC+1 (CET)
  - Summer (DST): UTC+2 (CEST)
- Postal code: 13867
- Dialing code: (+39) 015

Flecchia is a frazione (and a parish) of the municipality of Pray, in Piedmont, northern Italy.

== Name ==
In former times the village was named Flechia or Felicetum Libicorum.

== History ==
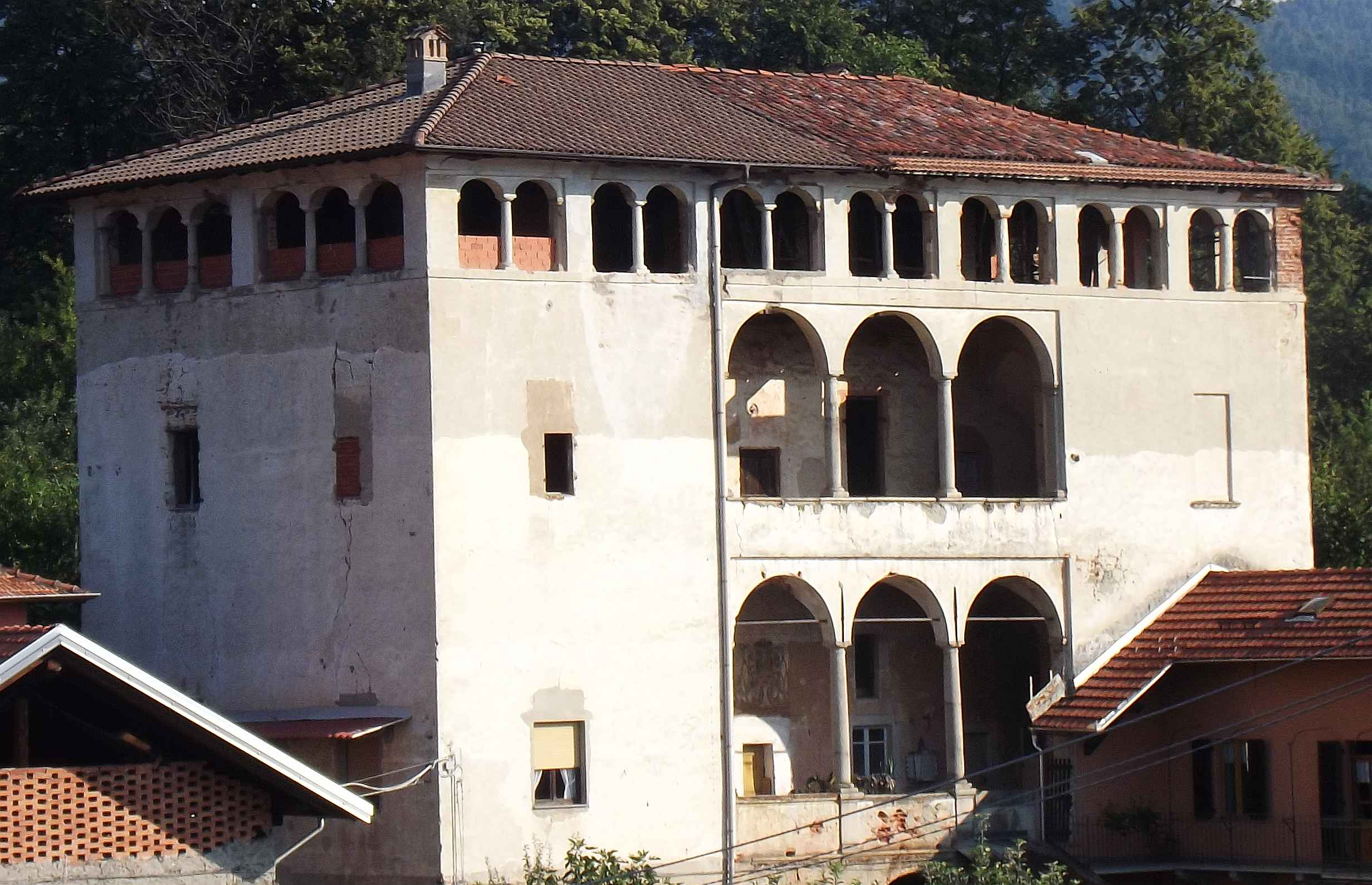
Palazzo Riccio

In 1305, Flecchia was severely damaged by the followers of fra Dolcino, who set fire to it.

The local parish of Sant'Ambrogio was established in 1438.

Since 1928 it has been a separate comune (municipality).

== Notable buildings ==
- Palazzo Riccio (or Palazzo Rizzi): the palace, which overlooks the village, was built in the 17th century on the remains of a Middle Ages fortress.
- Saint Ambrogio parish church, which was built in its present form during the 17th century.
