= Santuario della Brugarola =

Church building in Brugarola, Ailoche, Italy

Coordinates: 45°42′11″N 8°12′43″E

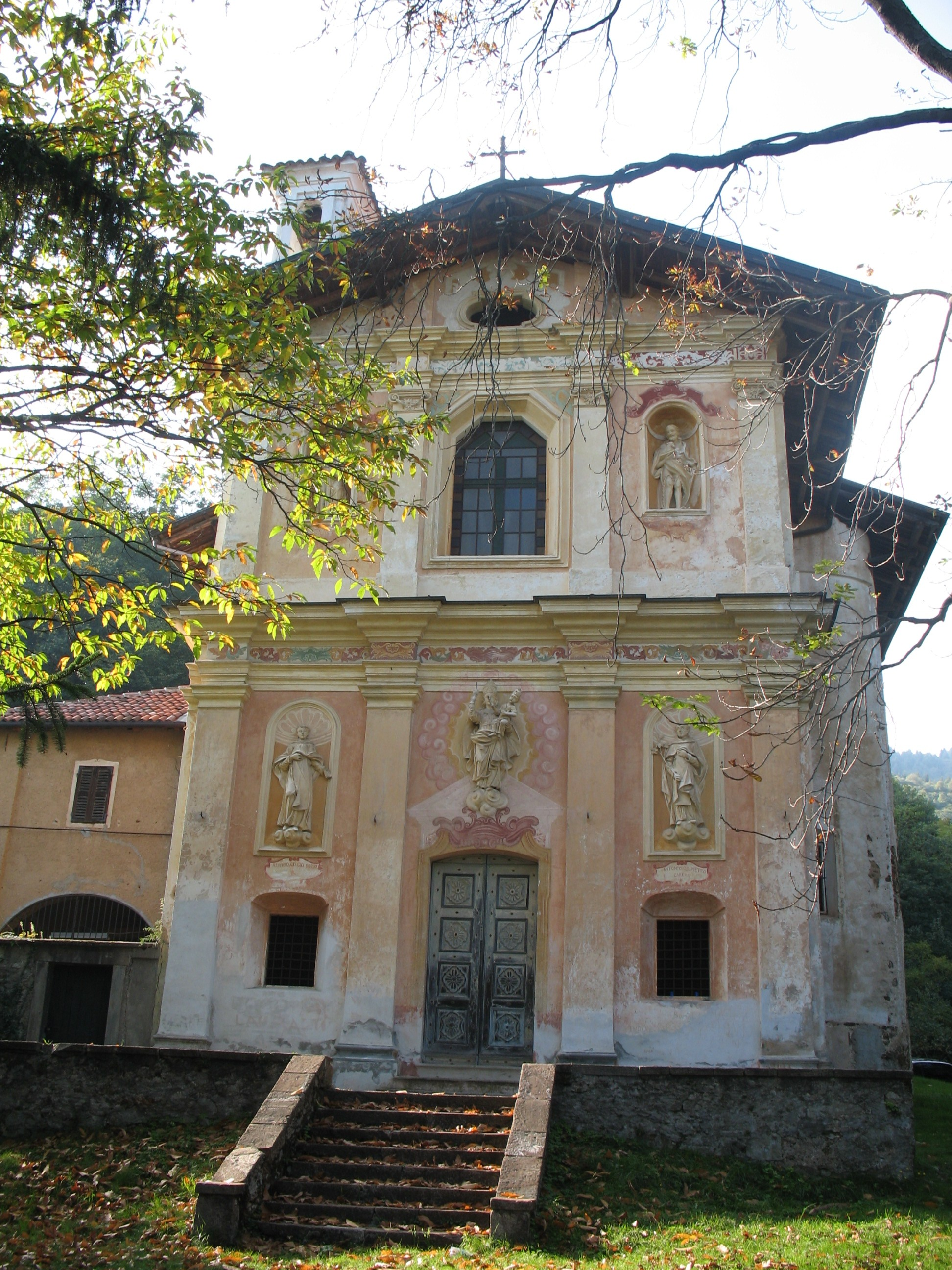
The sanctuary

Santuario della Brugarola is a sanctuary in Ailoche, Province of Biella in the Italian region of Piedmont. It was built in 1722 and dedicated to the Madonna d'Oropa.

Added to the church there is a structure once used as lodging by the hermits.

Together with Banchette Sanctuary in Bioglio and the Brughiera sanctuary in Trivero is part of the minor sanctuaries, all connected by the two ways CoEur - In the heart of European paths and Path of Saint Charles.

It was built in 1722 around the votive column where was painted the Black Madonna di Oropa. The façade is decorated with stucco and statues. The central altar is devoted to the Virgin Mary, represented between Eusebius of Vercelli and Bernard of Menthon. The side altars are dedicated to Saint Peter and Francis of Assisi.

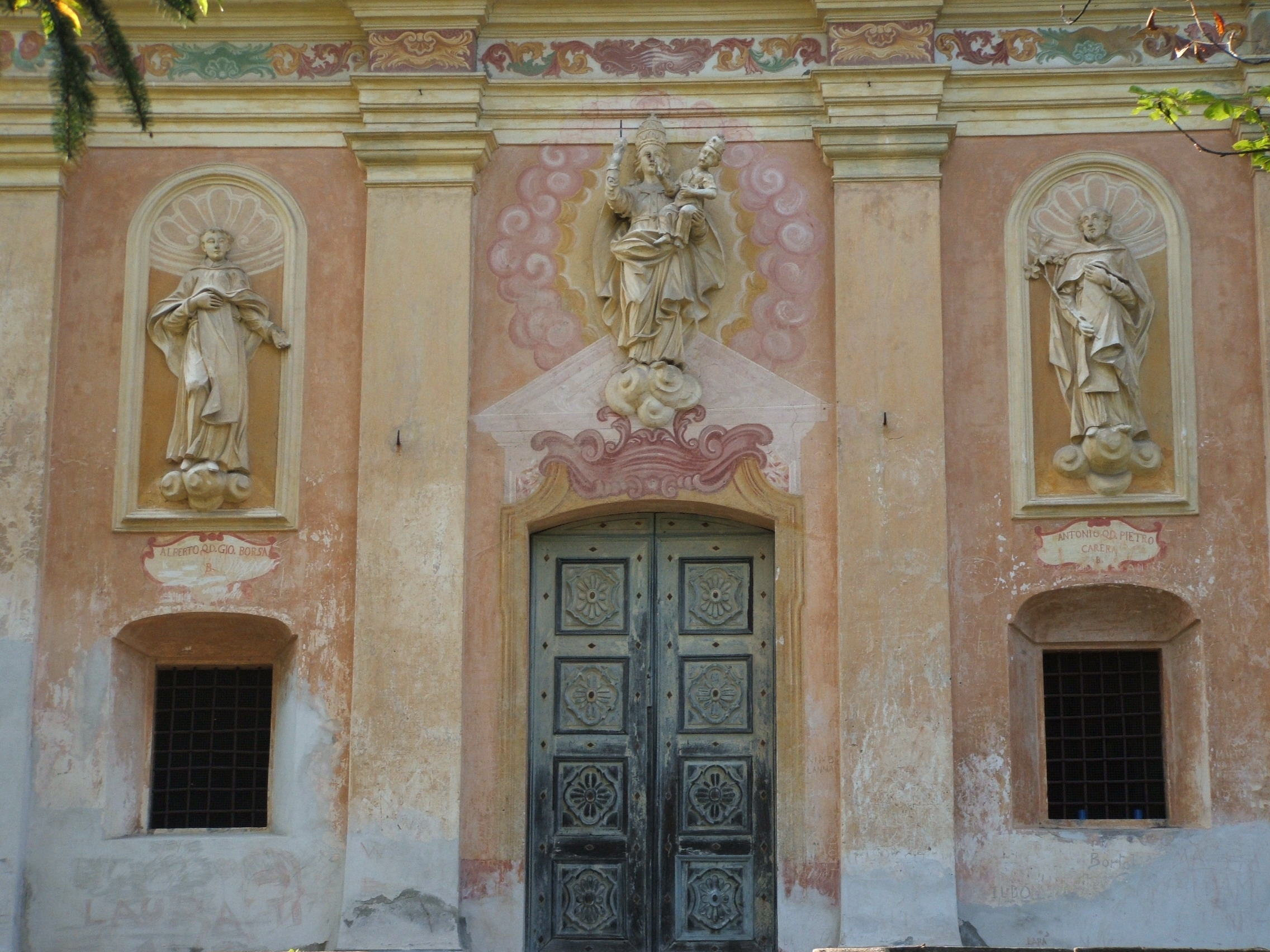
Detail of the façade
