= Nostra Signora della Brughiera =

Marian sanctuary in Trivero, Italy

Coordinates: 45.6583°N 8.1456°E

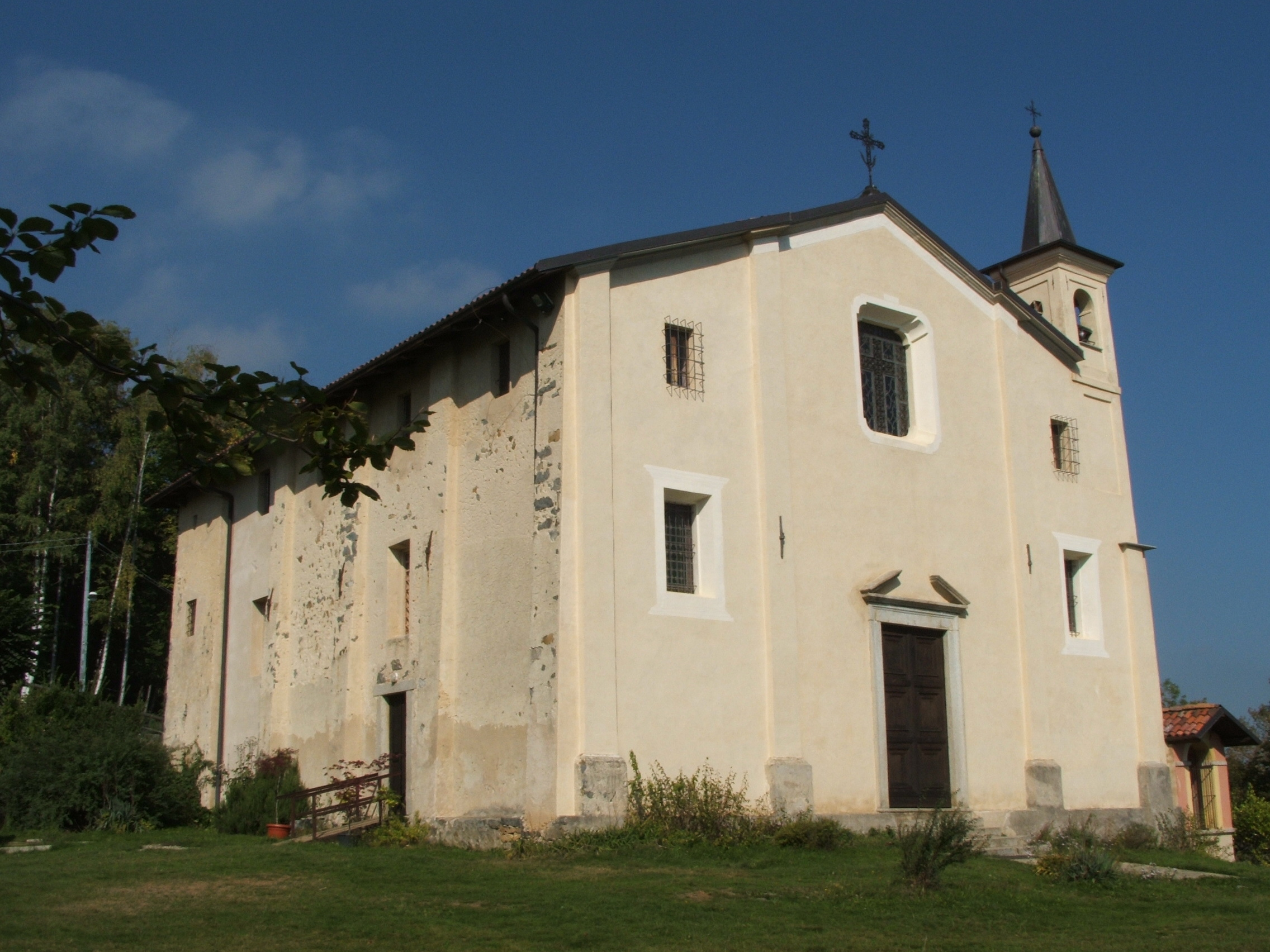
The sanctuary

The Nostra Signora della Brughiera (Italian: Santuario di Nostra Signora della Brughiera) is a sanctuary devoted to the Virgin Mary in the town of Trivero in northern Italy.

Together with the Brugarola sanctuary in Ailoche, the Mazzucco Sanctuary in Camandona and the Banchette Sanctuary in Bioglio it is one of the minor sanctuaries of the Biellese territory, all connected by the ways CoEur - In the heart of European paths and Path of Saint Charles.

Set at 800 m height, the sanctuary was built where the tradition says that the Madonna appeared to a mute shepherd girl, giving her the ability to speak.

The complex is made by two churches: the bigger one, centre of the sanctuary, and a smaller and ancient one, built in the 16th century on the ruins of a church of the XIV, where Fra Dolcino and his fellows camped out.

In the bigger church are preserved many Ex voto and art pieces: a "Nativity" by Giovanni Giacomo Barbelli, the frescos in the nave and in the presbytery and the wooden pulpit.

In the 18th century were built the house of the hermit and the lodging for the pilgrims.

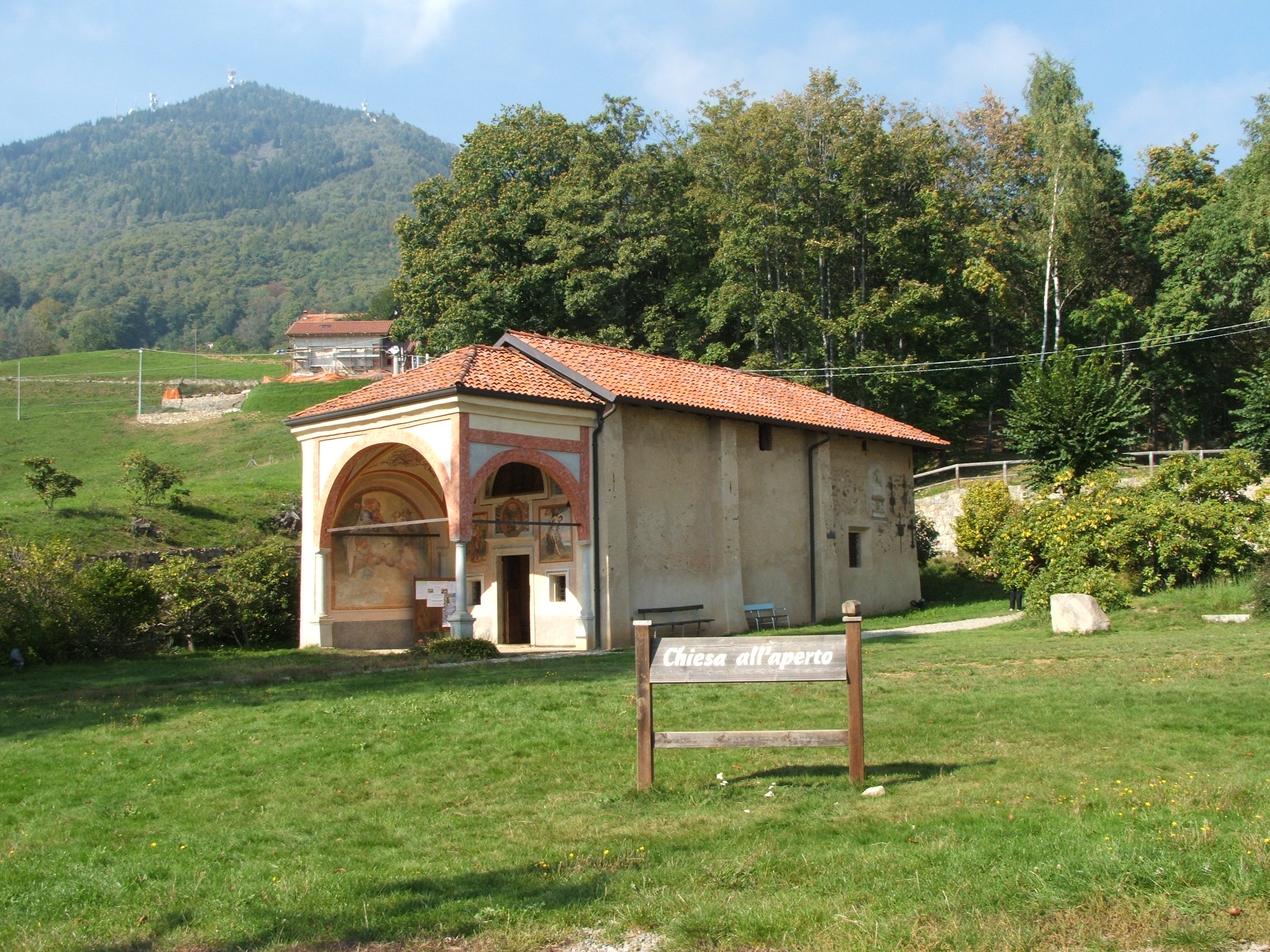
The ancient church

Near the sanctuary there is a mule track conducting to the Bulliana hamlet nearby, along which there is a Via Crucis of fourteen chapels decorated in the 19th century.

== The battle for the sanctuary ==
The church is set near the border between Trivero and Mosso. Its strategic position led to a battle, painted in the bigger church. On the fresco there is a writing describing the event: "On 25 March 1643, day of the Annunciation, many gunshots were shot, with no offense for anyone thanks to a miracle of the Virgin Mary".

== See also ==
- CoEur - In the heart of European paths
- Path of Saint Charles
