= Pray, Piedmont =

Pray
- Comune
- Comune di Pray
- Location within Italy Location within Piedmont
- Coordinates: 45°41′N 8°13′E
- Country: Italy
- Region: Piedmont
- Province: Province of Biella (BI)
- Frazioni: Flecchia, Pianceri

Government
  - Mayor: Lucio Aimone

Area
  - Total: 9.3 km^{2} (3.6 sq mi)

Population (Dec. 2004)
  - Total: 2,434
  - Density: 260/km^{2} (680/sq mi)
- Time zone: UTC+1 (CET)
  - Summer (DST): UTC+2 (CEST)
- Postal code: 13016
- Dialing code: 015

Pray is a comune (municipality) in the Province of Biella in the Italian region Piedmont, located about 80 kilometres (50 mi) northeast of Turin and about 15 kilometres (9 mi) northeast of Biella. As of 31 December 2004, it had a population of 2,434 and an area of 9.3 square kilometres (3.6 mi^{2}).

Pray borders the following municipalities: Caprile, Coggiola, Crevacuore, Curino, Portula, Trivero.

== Demographic evolution ==
Historical population

| Year | Pop. | ±% |
|---|---|---|
| 1861 | 1,473 | — |
| 1871 | 1,605 | +9.0% |
| 1881 | 1,812 | +12.9% |
| 1901 | 2,275 | +25.6% |
| 1911 | 2,726 | +19.8% |

| Year | Pop. | ±% |
|---|---|---|
| 1921 | 3,054 | +12.0% |
| 1931 | 3,749 | +22.8% |
| 1936 | 3,976 | +6.1% |
| 1951 | 4,244 | +6.7% |
| 1961 | 4,199 | −1.1% |

| Year | Pop. | ±% |
|---|---|---|
| 1971 | 3,489 | −16.9% |
| 1981 | 3,000 | −14.0% |
| 1991 | 2,683 | −10.6% |
| 2001 | 2,439 | −9.1% |

Source: Data from ISTAT
