= Sacro Monte di Andorno =

Christian devotional complex in Campiglia Cervo, Piedmont, Italy

Coordinates: 45.6584°N 7.9935°E

The Sacro Monte del Santuario di San Giovanni Battista d'Andorno is the Sacro Monte built around a sanctuary in the Cervo Valley above the village of Campiglia Cervo, at an altitude of 1020 meters. It is the only sanctuary devoted to Saint John in Italy and probably in Europe.

== The Sanctuary ==
The origins of the sanctuary are related to the devotion to John the Baptist in the Cervo Valley. Popular tradition says that shepherds found a statue of Saint John in a cave, so they decided to take it to their alpine pasture. During the following night, however, the statue returned in the cave. Many others tried to take the statue out of the cave, but they all failed. Those who believed in the sanctity of the cave built a chapel around it.

A 16th century wooden statue of John the Baptist still resides in the center of the sanctuary, preserved in the first chapel on the right. The cave and the statue were immediately famous and gave rise to stories of miraculous happenings. It was popularly believed that the water in the cave was able to cure eye diseases.

The first building of the sanctuary, possible thanks to the donation of the devotees, was completed in 1605 as it is said in the inscription on the portal: HUMILES NON ELATI REPLEBUNT TEMPLUM DXX. M. IV 1605. Due to the large number of believers coming to pray in the sanctuary, it became necessary to build larger structures near the church in order to accommodate the pilgrims. In the second half of the 17th century, a few chapels were built in which representations of the life of John the Baptist were depicted, but these were demolished in the 20th century in order to allow the building of a road.

The present day Baroque sanctuary was built in the third building phase (1738 - 1781) consisting in the enlargement of the sacristy and of the choir, designed by architect Bernardo Antonio Vittone. The inside of the church has one aisle and two chapels on each side, devoted to the parents of John the Baptist -- Elizabeth and Zechariah—and to the parents of Jesus (Mary and Saint Joseph). The ceiling is a groin vault; the one over the altar is decorated with the four evangelists, painted, like the altarpieces, by local artists. In 1934 the great service area in front of the church was arranged with the Hosteria (the tavern) and lodgings. In the middle there is a fountain (burnell), made in local stone.

== The Sacro Monte ==
The original building plan of the Sacro Monte is unknown. In 1661 three chapels already existed, while in 1700 was decided to build others along the mule track from Campiglia Cervo to the Sanctuary. Two chapels reported in the documents, representing the Visitation and the angel's announcement to Zechariah, were demolished to enlarge the road in the 20th century.

The five chapels still preserved are the ones built along the mule track; today they are in bad conditions and are surrounded by a beechwood. The architecture of this chapels is very simple and both the terracotta statues and the frescos were made by local painters at the beginning of the 18th century. The chapels are a statement of the popular devotion to the hermit saints: the first one is devoted to Anthony the Great and Paul of Thebes, the second to Hilarion, the third to Jerome, the fourth to Onuphrius and the last one to Mary Magdalene.

== Gallery ==
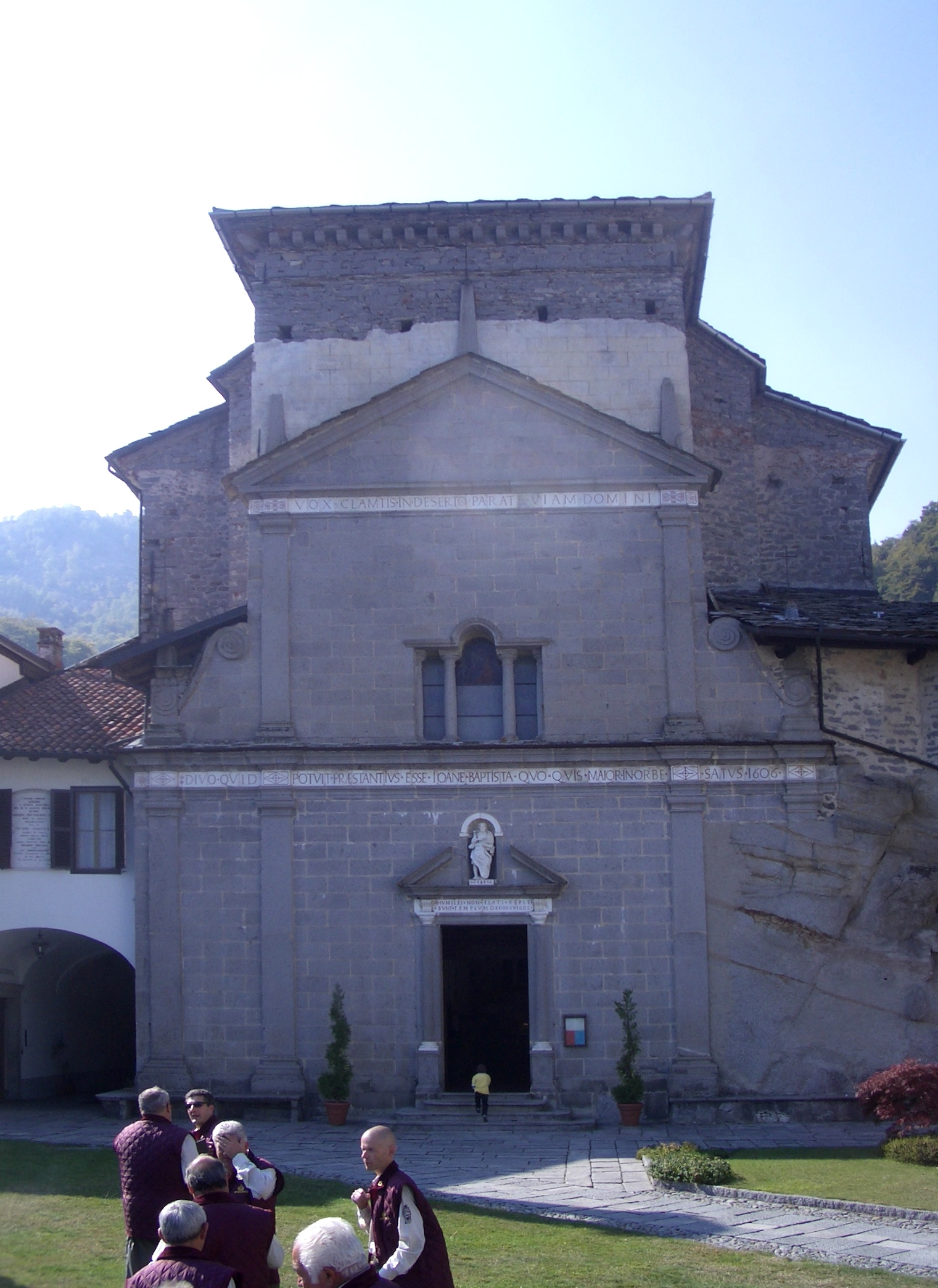
The sanctuary

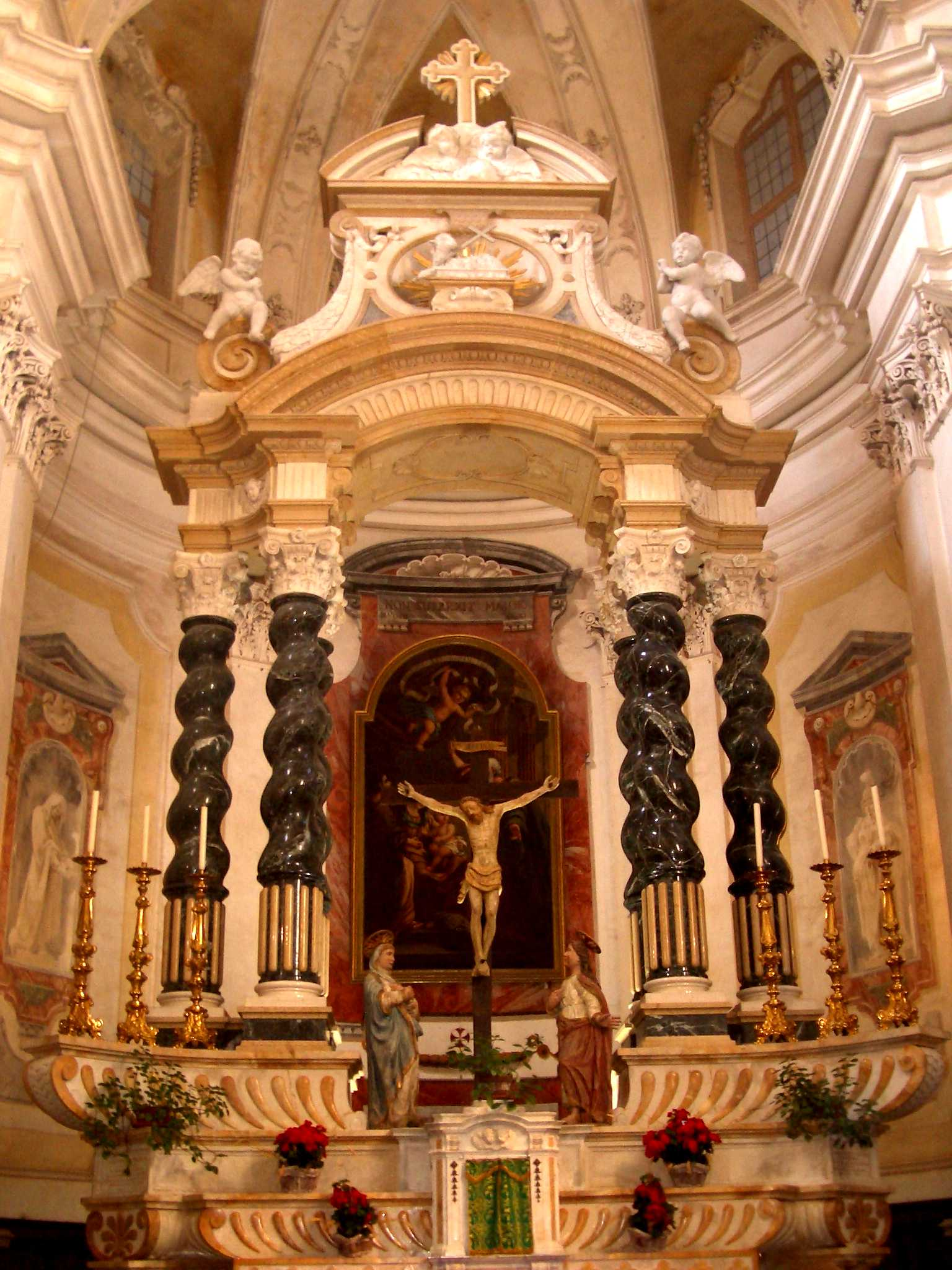
The altar

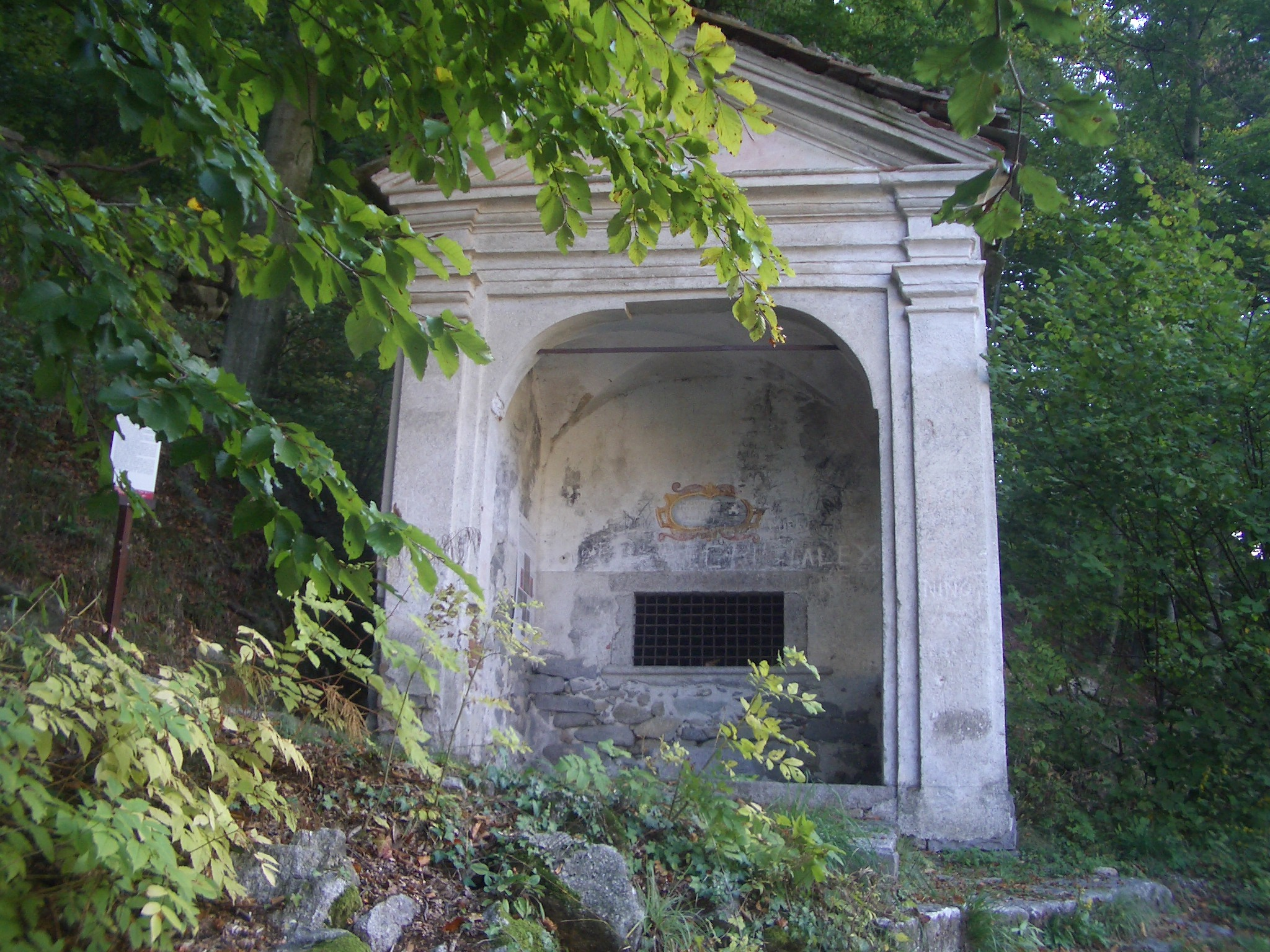
Sacro Monte, Sant'Antonio abate and San Paolo eremita chapel

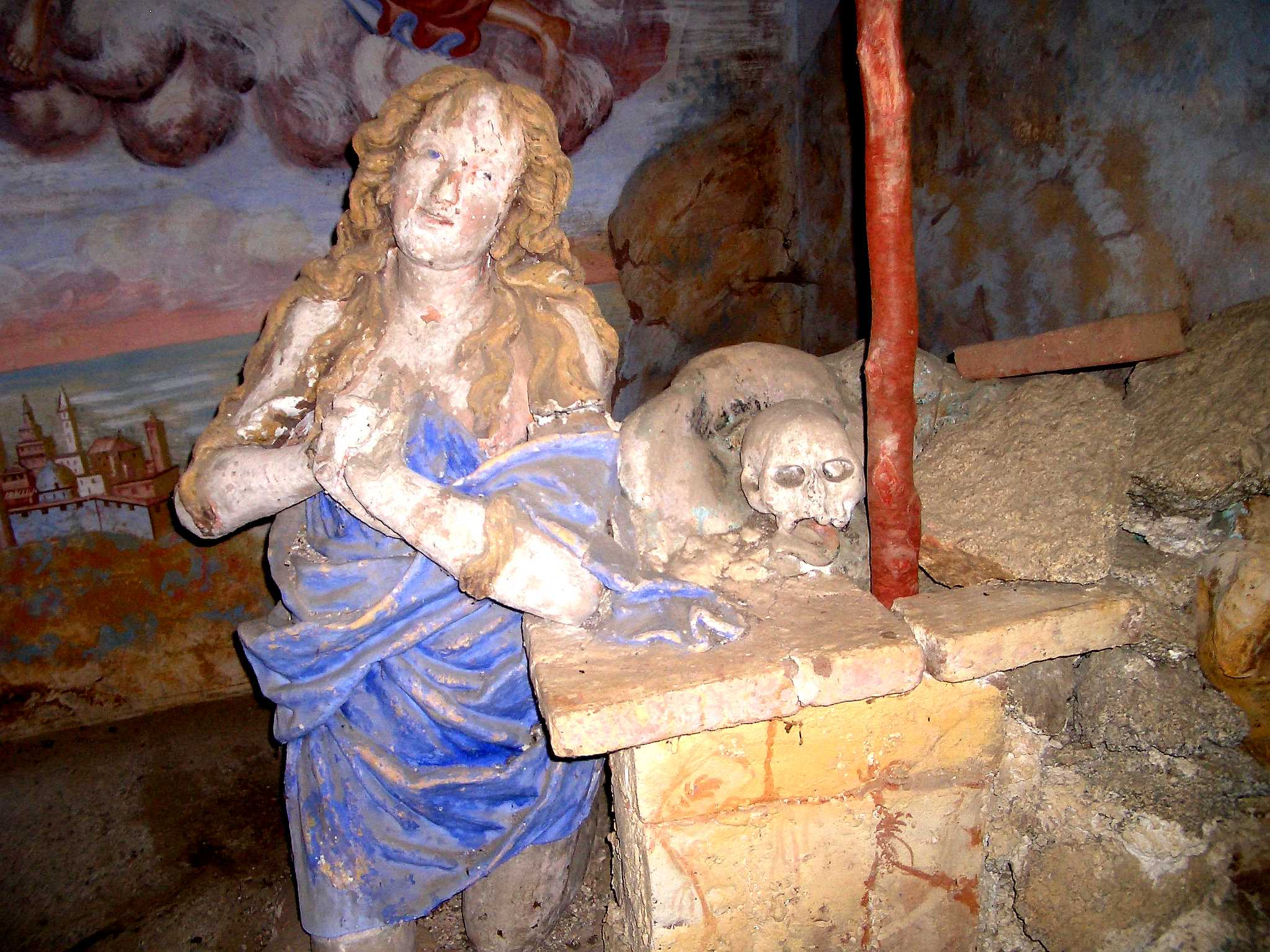
Sacro Monte, Mary Magdalen penitent chapel

== Bibliography ==
- Centini, Massimo, I Sacri Monti nell'arco alpino italiano, Priuli & Verlucca, Ivrea, 1990

== See also ==
- CoEur - In the heart of European paths
- Via Francigena
- Path of Saint Charles
- Sacro Monte
- Sacro Monte di Oropa
- Sacro Monte di Graglia
