= Sacro Monte di Graglia =

Type of devotional place in northern Italy

Coordinates: 45.5612°N 7.9561°E

The Sacro Monte di Graglia is one of the numerous devotional places around the Italian Alps and it houses the Santuario di Nostra Signora di Loreto, one of the four major sanctuaries of the Biellese territory. Set in the Valle Elvo at 690 m on the sea level, the sanctuary is built near the Lauretana water industry.

The complex is a stage of many devotional paths, which include the CoEur - In the heart of European paths and the Path of Saint Charles.

== History ==
=== 1615: don Velotti's project ===
The history of the Sacro Monte is related to the religious feelings of the early 17th century, when the idea of a "New Jerusalem" built in the neighbourhood was famous thanks to the Sacro Monte di Varallo.

Don Andrea Velotti, the parish priest of Graglia had this idea in 1605, as he came back from the Holy Land. The project imagined the building of 100 chapels decorated with statues narrating several biblical episodes, from the Genesis to the Life of Jesus.

The building began in 1616 and lasted eight years: in this period only 10 chapels were built and the whole project stopped when don Velotti died in 1624.

=== 1654: Pietro Arduzzi's project ===
In the following years, thanks to the grace received from Nostra Signora di Loreto, a new project was designed: the building of a majestic sanctuary consecrated to the Madonna Lauretana, with a shelter for pilgrims. Charles Emmanuel II, Duke of Savoy was interested in the project and sent the court military engineer Pietro Arduzzi to design the church, and also financed the building. The building began in 1654 and the central plan church was intent to incorporate, beneath the dome, a chapel picturing the so-called Nazareth's house relic kept in the Basilica della Santa Casa di Loreto. The construction was fast, but it stopped a few times due to wars, famines and epidemics. Only in 1684 the four chapels connected to the sanctuary (Nativity of Jesus, Visit of the Magi, Presentation of Jesus at the Temple, Circumcision) were completed.

In the courtyard were positioned two sundials and a stone fountain (the burnell, typical of all the Biellese sanctuaries).

=== 1760: the Vittone's conclusion ===
The conclusion of the Sanctuary took place between 1760 and 1769 thanks to the architect Bernardo Antonio Vittone, who maintained the Greek cross plan. The façade is rough and severe due to the visible bricks and it contrasts with the inner baroque decoration.

The chapel dedicated to the Virgin has the same measures and position of the one in Loreto. A statue of the Black Madonna was placed in the chapel, in order to seal the importance of the worship to the black Madonna in the Biellese territory, adding this church to the Santuario di Oropa.

The dome is a majestic structure (38 m height), painted with frescos with a false perspective in 1780.

=== 1788 and 1829: repositioning of the Casa di Loreto ===
In 1788 the inside of the church was modified and the imitation of the Santa Casa di Loreto, set in the centre of the church, was moved forward near the presbytery. In 1828 it was ultimately repositioned in the former Chapel of the Massacre of the Innocents.

=== Today ===
The sanctuary is still today destination of pilgrimages, while the only ten chapels of the Sacro Monte realised are in poor conditions. The church of Saint Charles, that was designed to be the end of the Sacro Monte, contains the statue of Saint Charles Borromeo praying before the dead body of Jesus.

The four chapels dedicated to the childhood of Jesus have been added to the church, preserving the statues.

=== The eleven syllable echo ===
Along the path connecting the sanctuary with Colle S. Carlo, there is a spot where you can produce the phenomenon of the echo, so clear that can repeat up to eleven syllables.

== Gallery ==
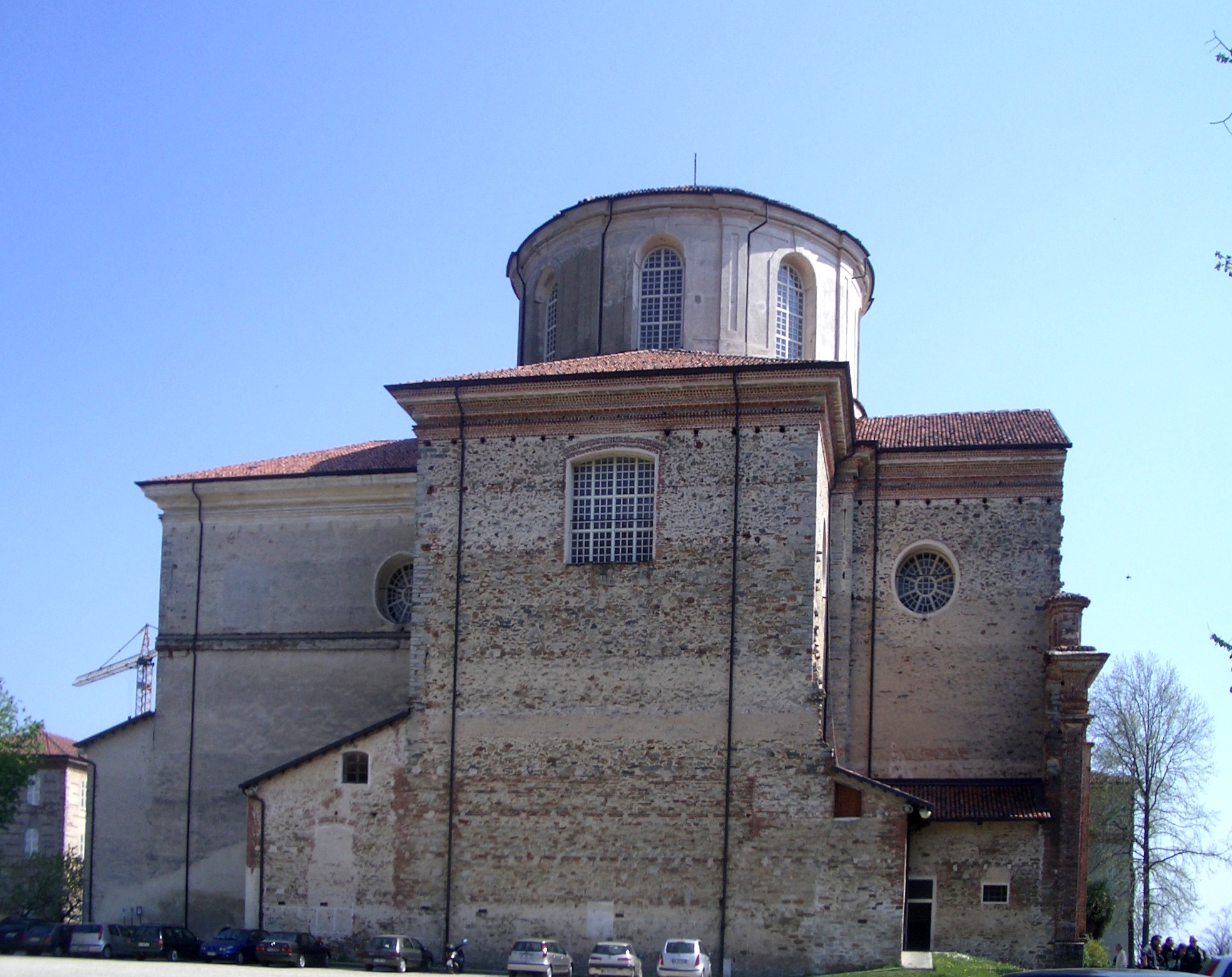
Santuario di Graglia

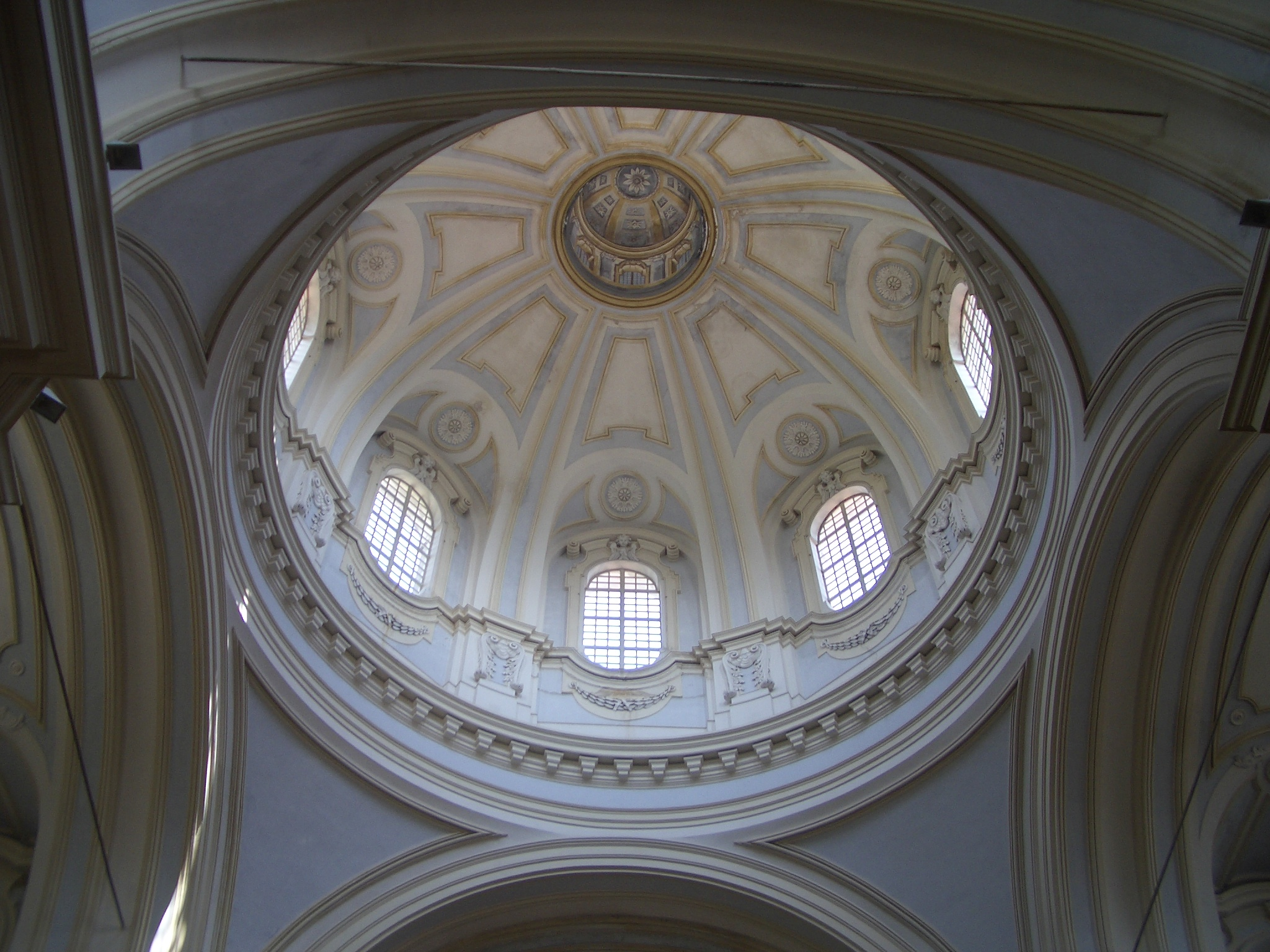
Santuario di Graglia, dome

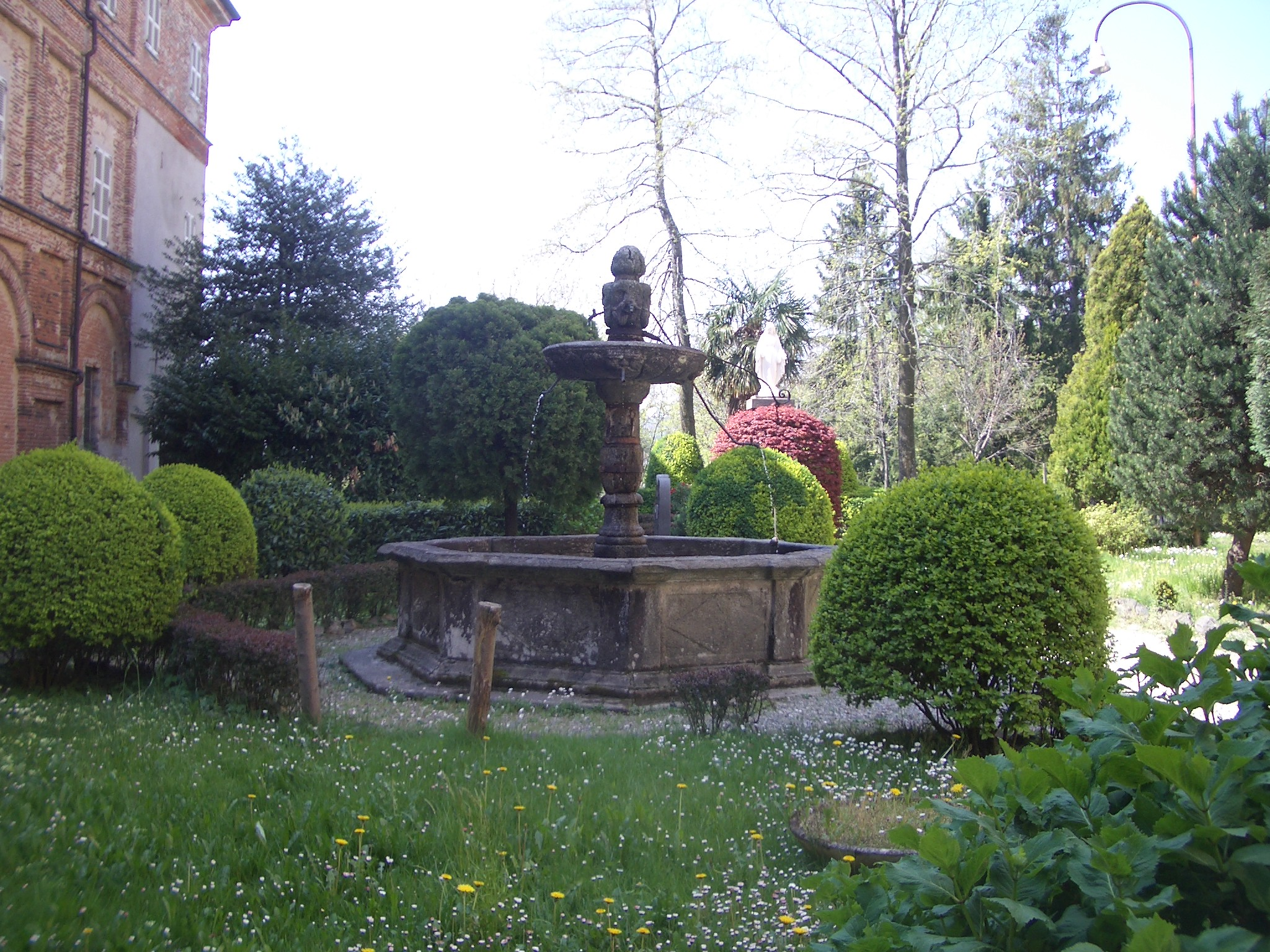
Santuario di Graglia, fountain

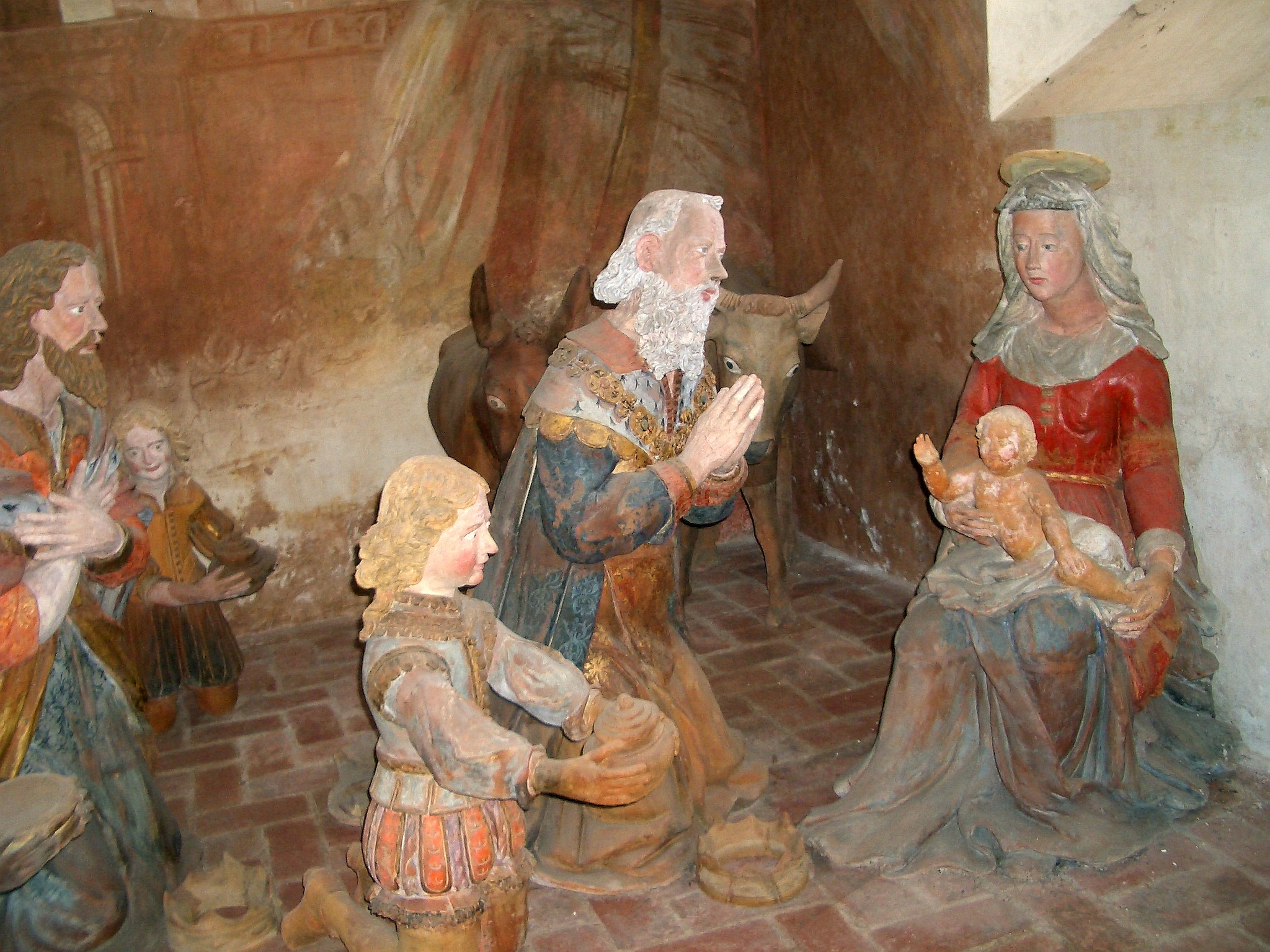
Adoration of the Magi chapel

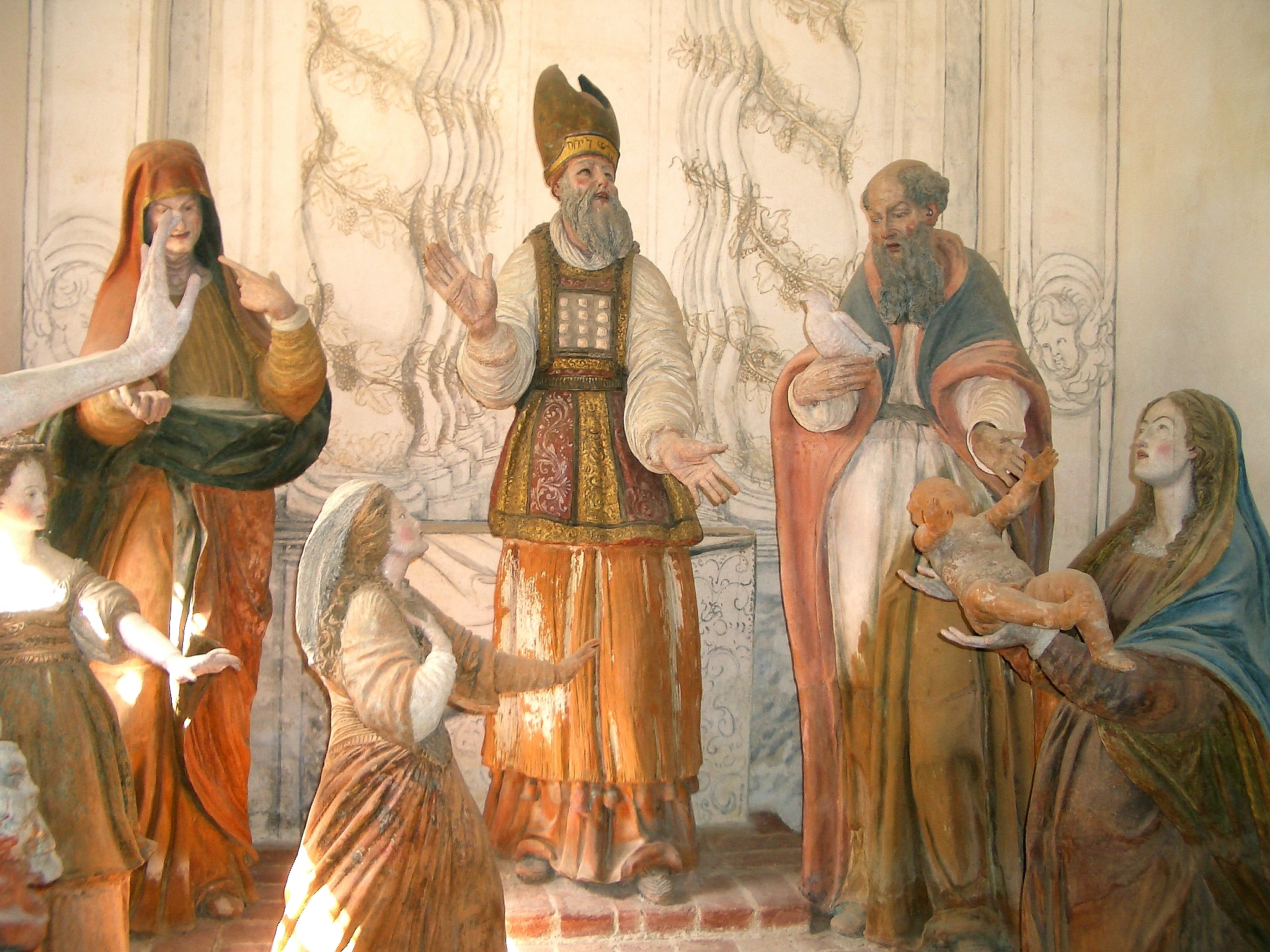
Presentation of Jesus at the Temple chapel

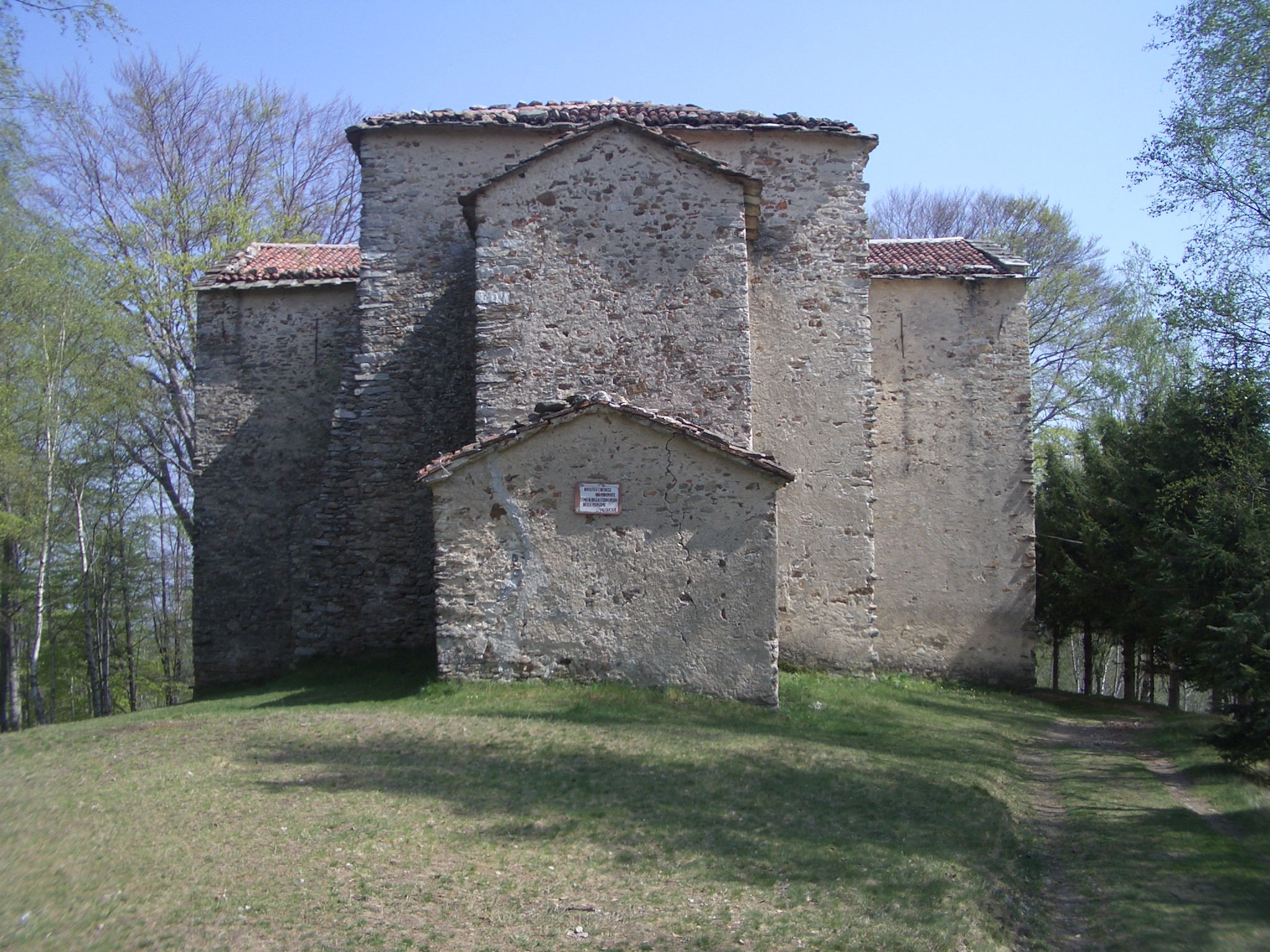
Church of Saint Charles, Graglia

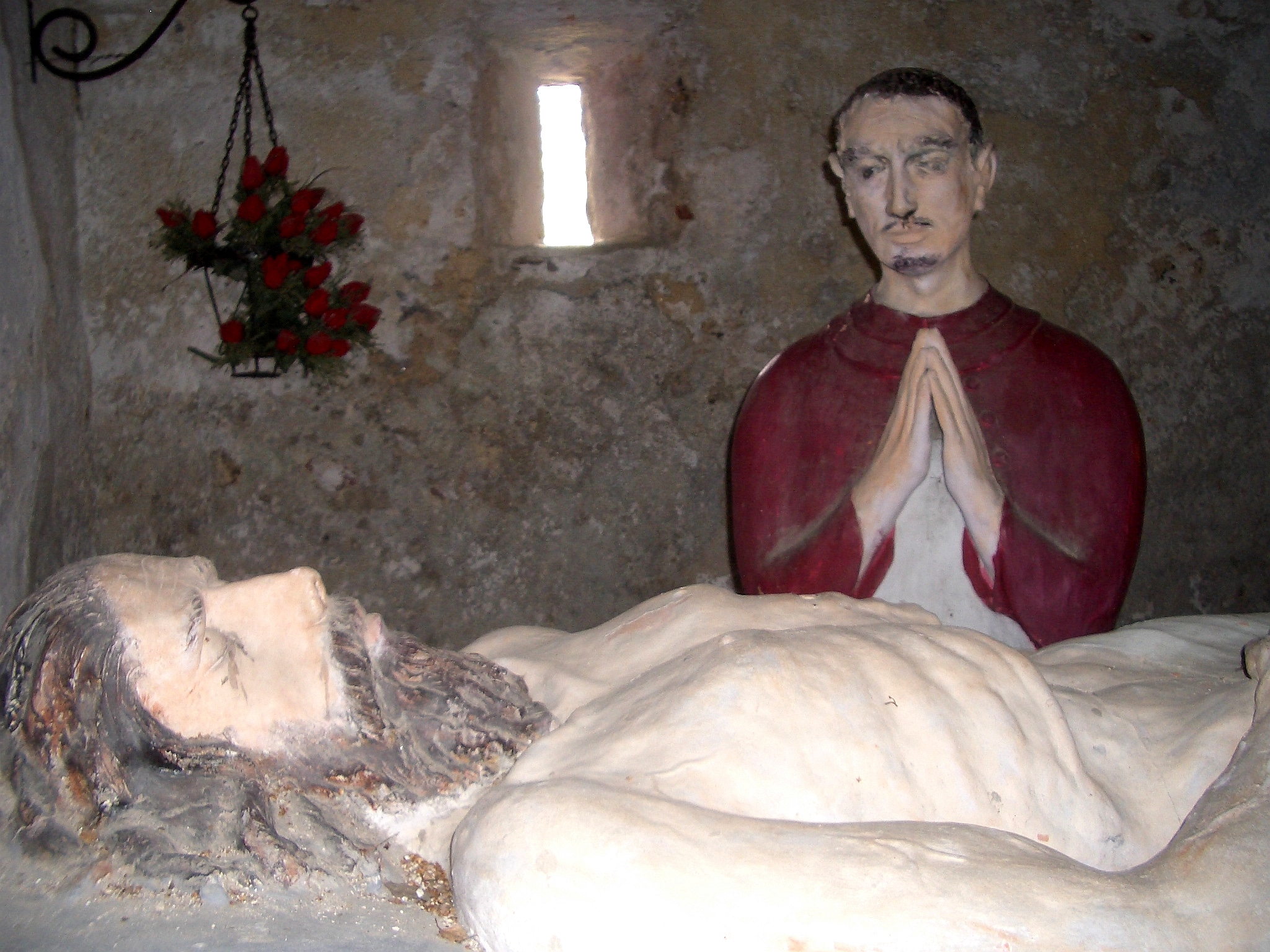
Statue of Saint Charles Borromeo praying, Church of Saint Charles

== Bibliography ==
- Gianni Carlo Sciolla, Il Biellese dal Medioevo all'Ottocento, Istituto Bancario San Paolo, Torino, 1980

== See also ==
- CoEur - In the heart of European paths
- Via Francigena
- Path of Saint Charles
- Sacro Monte
- Sacro Monte di Oropa
- Sacro Monte di Andorno
