= Santuario della Novareia =

Sanctuary in Piedmont, Italy

Coordinates: 45.6931°N 8.1611°E

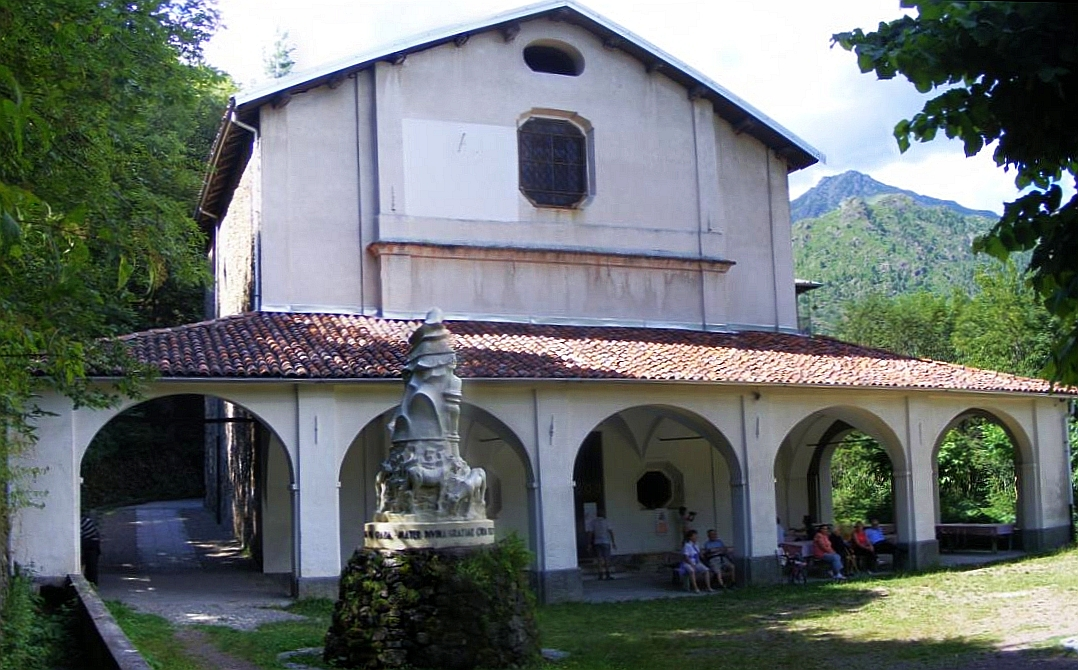
The sanctuary

The Novareia sanctuary (Italian santuario della Novareia) is devoted to Our Lady of Graces. It is set in the commune of Portula at 750 m height.

== History ==
The sanctuary was built where in 1650 the Virgin Mary appeared to an old lady, Antonina Cravetta, and asked to build a church. Following this apparition a wooden chapel was built.

The actual building was erected after the apparition to Giacomo di Michel in 1712. The church was begun in the 17th century and completed during the 19th century. The simple and elegant façade has a large portico, used as a resting space for pilgrims. In front of the entrance, a statue of the Virgin Mary has been placed.

The sanctuary is one of the devotional places connected by the two paths CoEur and Path of Saint Charles.

== Bibliography ==
- Biella e provincia, TCI, 2002, p. 110

== See also ==
- CoEur - In the heart of European paths
- Path of Saint Charles
