= Coggiola =

- Comune
- Comune di Coggiola
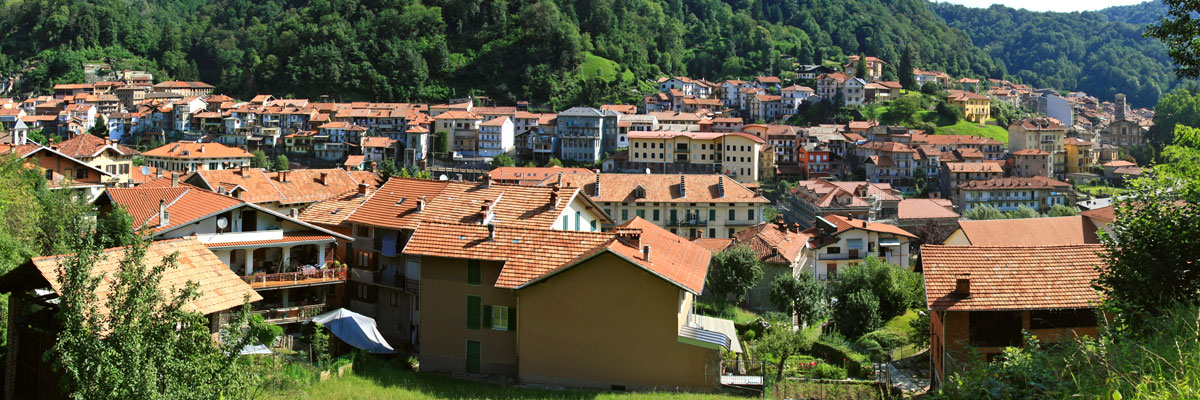
- View of Coggiola

- Location within Italy Location within Piedmont
- Coordinates: 45°41′N 8°11′E
- Country: Italy
- Region: Piedmont
- Province: Biella (BI)
- Frazioni: Villa Sopra, Villa Sotto, Formantero, Ponte S.Giovanni, Vico, Zuccaro, Castello, Camplin, Viera, Rivò, Biolla, Viera Superiore, Casa Chieti, Piletta, Fervazzo

Government
  - Mayor: Paolo Setti

Area
  - Total: 23.7 km^{2} (9.2 sq mi)
- Elevation: 450 m (1,480 ft)

Population (31 December 2021)
  - Total: 1,644
  - Density: 69.4/km^{2} (180/sq mi)
- Demonym: Coggiolesi
- Time zone: UTC+1 (CET)
  - Summer (DST): UTC+2 (CEST)
- Postal code: 13863
- Dialing code: 015
- Website: Official website

Coggiola is a comune (municipality) in the Province of Biella in the Italian region Piedmont, located about 80 kilometres (50 mi) northeast of Turin and about 15 kilometres (9 mi) northeast of Biella. As of 31 December 2004, it had a population of 2,285 and an area of 23.7 square kilometres (9.2 mi^{2}).

Coggiola borders the following municipalities: Ailoche, Caprile, Portula, Pray.

The municipal territory houses the sanctuaries of Cavallero and Moglietti.

== Twin towns ==
Coggiola is twinned with:

- La Fare-les-Oliviers, France
