= Path of Saint Charles =

Hiking trail in Italy

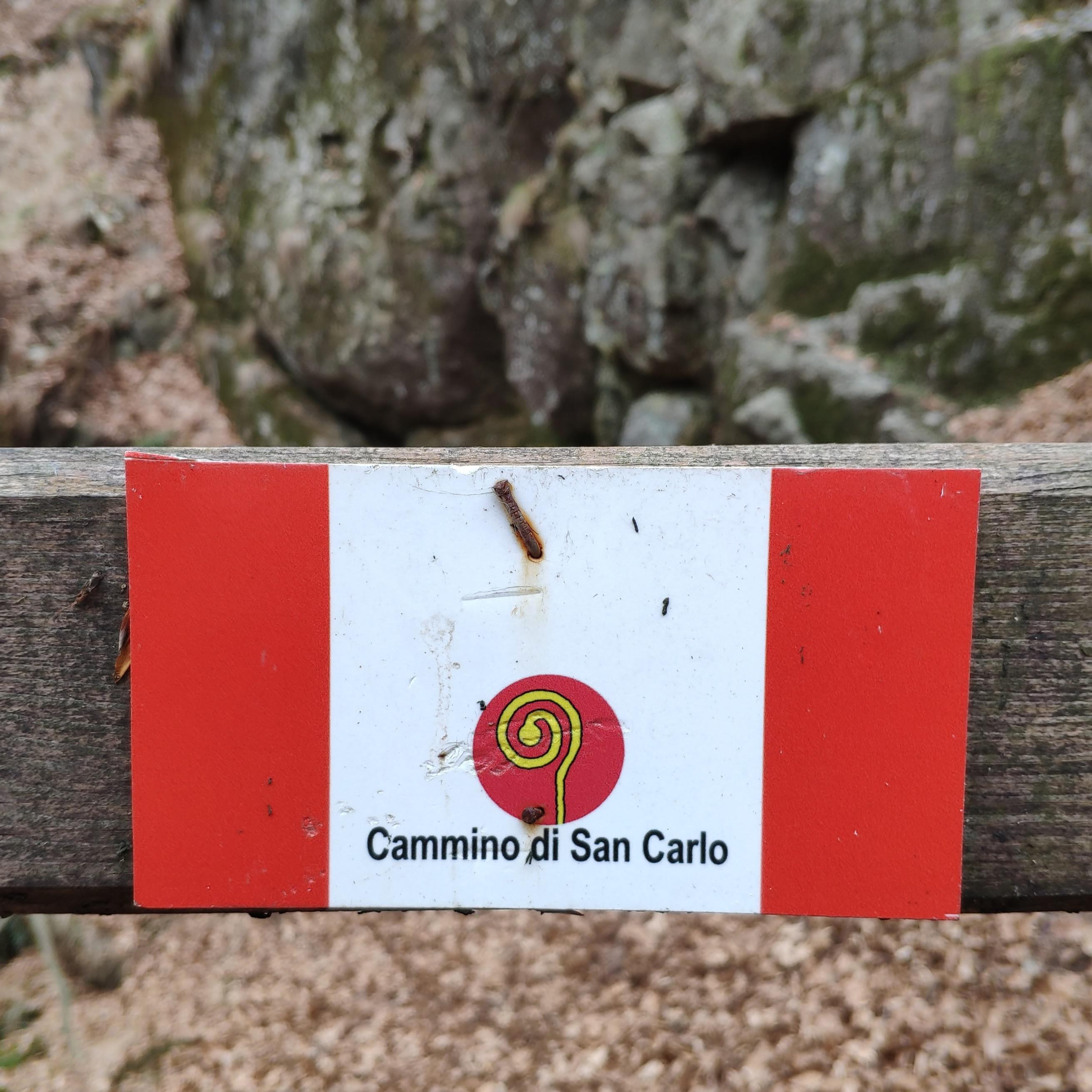

The Path of Saint-Charles (Cammino di San Carlo) is an historical, artistic and devotional route in Italy which follows the travels of Saint Charles Borromeo from Arona, his native town, and Viverone, where the path joins the Via Francigena.

The 200 km may be divided into 12 stages for walkers and in four stages for bikers.

This path is one of the most important routes of CoEur - In the heart of European paths.

== Origin of the path ==
The path arose following research about Saint Charles Borromeo and his travels in northern Piedmont and of the Biellese territory in particular. This research traced the numerous transits of Borromeo through the valleys of Biella, along with evidence of the consecration of altars and churches between 1610 and 1640, the year of his canonization.

=== Saint Charles in northern Piedmont ===
Saint Charles passed through the northern Piedmont many times during his pilgrimages and travels. In 1571, 1578 and 1584, he visited the Sacro Monte di Varallo to check its construction. He also stopped there during his many travels between Milan and Turin when visiting the Shroud of Turin.

In September 1584, Saint Charles was in the Biellese territory to visit a relative, the marquis Besso Ferrero Fieschi of Masserano, who was sick. After leaving Masserano, Charles went to Vercelli and afterwards to Turin, to visit the shroud. He went back to Biella on 10 October, when the marquis Besso died. The next day, St Charles went to Masserano to minister the burial. The day after he left for Varallo, where he arrived on 12 October. He stayed until 29 October and, despite his malaria, he left for Switzerland to sign a document, and afterwards he went back to Milan, where he died on 3 November.

== The stages ==
1. Arona (colossus of Saint Charles) - Orta. It connects Lake Maggiore with Lake Orta.
2. Orta - Varallo. The stage passes through the Peregrinatio, the historical path between the two Sacri Monti.
3. Varallo - Guardabosone. The stage passes through the Val Sesia, where there are two churches: Madonna di Loreto in Varallo and S. Giovanni al Monte in Quarona.
4. Guardabosone - Coggiola. The stage is in Valsessera.
5. Coggiola - Brughiera di Trivero. This stage connects three sanctuaries: Cavallero, Novareia and Brughiera.
6. Brughiera di Trivero - Pettinengo. The stage is in the Strona valley.
7. Pettinengo - S. Giovanni d'Andorno. The stage enters the Cervo Valley and ends at the Sanctuary of San Giovanni d'Andorno.
8. S. Giovanni d'Andorno - Santuario di Oropa. The stage is via a segment of the tracciolino, the road imagined by Ermenegildo Zegna but never realized, which connects the Sanctuary of S. Giovanni with the Sanctuary of Oropa, the most important sanctuary devoted to the black Madonna in the Alps.
9. Santuario d'Oropa - Sordevolo. The stage passes through the Elvo valley, crosses the Burcina park, and arrives in Sordevolo, where, every five years, a popular Passion play is staged.
10. Sordevolo - Santuario di Graglia. The stage passes two sites of the Ecomuseum of the Biellese (Trappa of Sordevolo and Bagneri village) and arrives at the Sanctuary of Graglia.
11. Graglia - Chiaverano. The stage is in Canavese, passing the Serra d'Ivrea.
12. Chiaverano - Viverone. The stage passes the Bose Monastic Community, and connects the Path of Saint Charles with the Via Francigena.

=== By bike ===
- 1st stage: Arona (colossum of Saint Charles) - Sacro Monte di Varallo (66 km)
- 2nd stage: Sacro Monte di Varallo - Sanctuario della Brughiera (52 km)
- 3rd stage: Santuario della Brughiera - Santuario di Oropa (45 km)
- 4th stage: Santuario di Oropa - Via Francigena (54 km)

== The UNESCO sites ==
The path connects five world heritage UNESCO sites.

- Three Sacri Monti of Piedmont and Lombardy :
  - Sacro Monte di Oropa
  - Sacro Monte di Varallo
  - Sacro Monte di Orta
- Two Prehistoric pile dwellings around the Alps :
  - VI.1-Emissario in Viverone
  - Site near the Lagoni di Mercurago (Arona)

== Natural reserves ==
Along the way there are many nature parks and natural reserves.

- Nature park of the Lagoni of Mercurago
- Nature park of Monte Fenera
- Natural reserve of the Parco Burcina - Felice Piacenza
- Natural reserve of the Bessa
- Natural reserve of the Sacro Monte di Varallo
- Natural reserve of the Sacro Monte di Orta
- Natural reserve of the Sacro Monte di Oropa
- Protected area of the Oasi Zegna
- SCI of the Valsessera

== See also ==
- CoEur - In the heart of European paths
- Via Francigena
- Camino de Santiago
- UNESCO
