= List of municipalities of the Province of Biella =

The following is a list of the 74 municipalities (comuni) of the Province of Biella in the region of Piedmont in Italy.

== List ==
Municipality	Population (2026)	Area (km²)	Density
Ailoche	289	10.78	26.8
Andorno Micca	3,014	11.89	253.5
Benna	1,157	9.39	123.2
Biella	43,356	46.69	928.6
Bioglio	888	18.85	47.1
Borriana	855	5.35	159.8
Brusnengo	1,845	10.45	176.6
Callabiana	145	6.56	22.1
Camandona	321	9.20	34.9
Camburzano	1,127	3.80	296.6
Campiglia Cervo	488	28.20	17.3
Candelo	7,196	15.12	475.9
Caprile	191	11.60	16.5
Casapinta	365	2.86	127.6
Castelletto Cervo	758	14.90	50.9
Cavaglià	3,464	25.63	135.2
Cerrione	2,750	27.99	98.2
Coggiola	1,617	23.78	68.0
Cossato	13,833	27.73	498.8
Crevacuore	1,373	8.60	159.7
Curino	466	21.65	21.5
Donato	681	12.07	56.4
Dorzano	528	4.74	111.4
Gaglianico	3,803	4.50	845.1
Gifflenga	104	2.26	46.0
Graglia	1,440	20.14	71.5
Lessona	2,590	12.78	202.7
Magnano	339	10.56	32.1
Massazza	581	11.61	50.0
Masserano	1,895	27.07	70.0
Mezzana Mortigliengo	475	4.31	110.2
Miagliano	535	0.67	798.5
Mongrando	3,555	16.50	215.5
Mottalciata	1,272	18.39	69.2
Muzzano	551	6.10	90.3
Netro	895	12.57	71.2
Occhieppo Inferiore	3,793	4.06	934.2
Occhieppo Superiore	2,531	5.15	491.5
Pettinengo	1,443	15.30	94.3
Piatto	470	3.59	130.9
Piedicavallo	168	17.75	9.5
Pollone	1,947	16.22	120.0
Ponderano	3,608	7.05	511.8
Portula	1,077	11.31	95.2
Pralungo	2,293	7.25	316.3
Pray	1,999	9.18	217.8
Quaregna Cerreto	2,045	8.41	243.2
Ronco Biellese	1,409	3.85	366.0
Roppolo	805	8.65	93.1
Rosazza	95	9.02	10.5
Sagliano Micca	1,594	14.61	109.1
Sala Biellese	531	8.03	66.1
Salussola	1,835	38.52	47.6
Sandigliano	2,563	10.22	250.8
Sordevolo	1,260	13.74	91.7
Sostegno	732	18.07	40.5
Strona	941	3.72	253.0
Tavigliano	884	11.24	78.6
Ternengo	264	1.98	133.3
Tollegno	2,342	3.31	707.6
Torrazzo	192	5.77	33.3
Valdengo	2,341	7.68	304.8
Valdilana	9,880	61.13	161.6
Vallanzengo	189	4.67	40.5
Valle San Nicolao	815	13.26	61.5
Veglio	421	6.41	65.7
Verrone	1,160	8.59	135.0
Vigliano Biellese	7,577	8.40	902.0
Villa del Bosco	312	3.70	84.3
Villanova Biellese	173	7.87	22.0
Viverone	1,318	12.26	107.5
Zimone	377	2.95	127.8
Zubiena	1,138	12.47	91.3
Zumaglia	959	2.61	367.4

== See also ==
- List of municipalities of Piedmont
- List of municipalities of Italy
