= Carisio =

- Comune
- Comune di Carisio
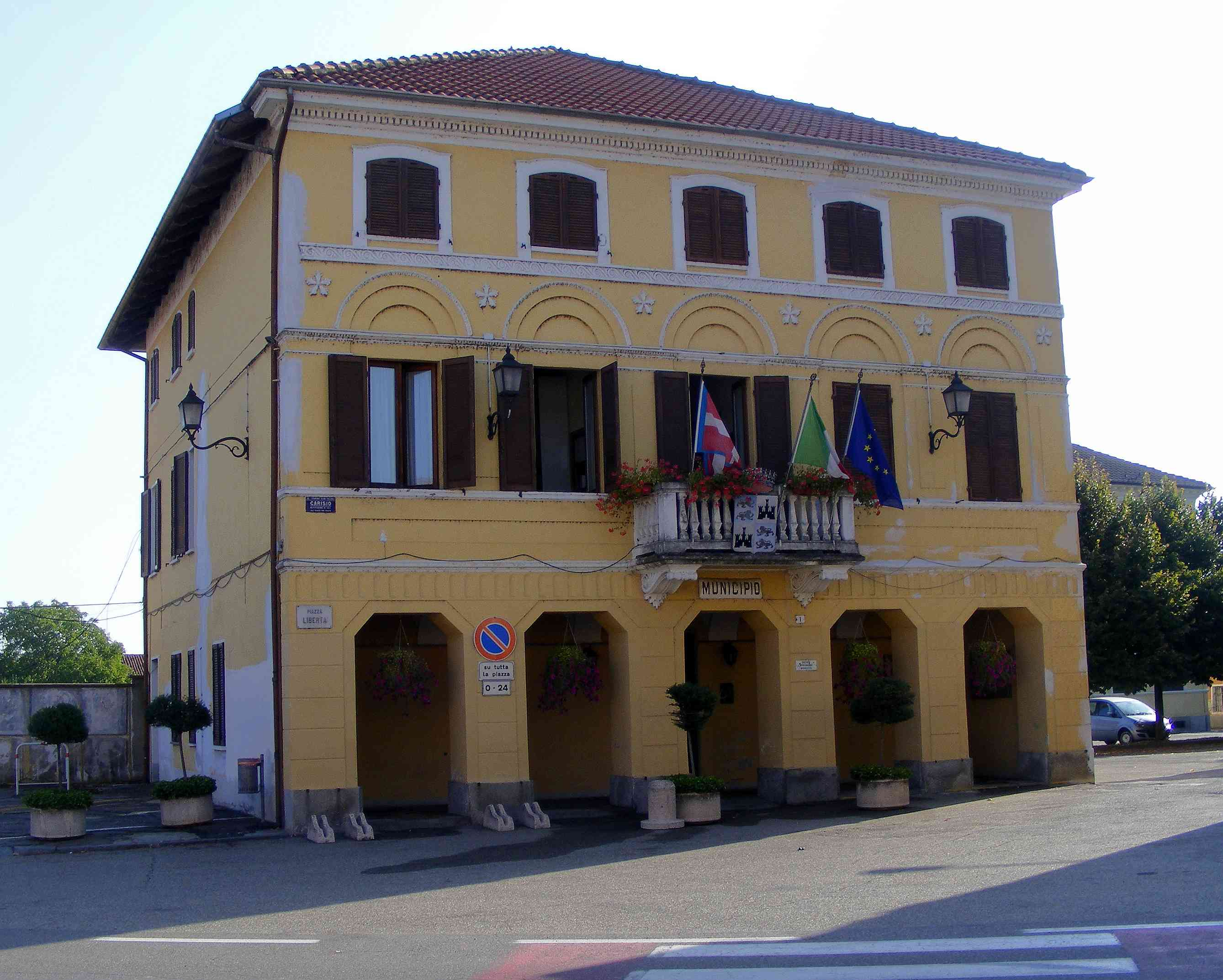
- Town hall.

- Coat of arms

- Location within Italy Location within Piedmont
- Coordinates: 45°25′N 8°12′E
- Country: Italy
- Region: Piedmont
- Province: Vercelli (VC)

Government
  - Mayor: Claudio Costanzo

Area
  - Total: 30.1 km^{2} (11.6 sq mi)
- Elevation: 183 m (600 ft)

Population (Dec. 2004)
  - Total: 953
  - Density: 31.7/km^{2} (82.0/sq mi)
- Demonym: Carisini
- Time zone: UTC+1 (CET)
  - Summer (DST): UTC+2 (CEST)
- Postal code: 13040
- Dialing code: 0161
- Patron saint: St. Lawrence

Carisio is a comune (municipality) in the Province of Vercelli in the Italian region Piedmont, located about 60 kilometres (37 miles) northeast of Turin and about 20 km (12 mi) northwest of Vercelli.

Carisio borders the following municipalities: Balocco, Buronzo, Cavaglià, Formigliana, Salussola, Santhià, and Villanova Biellese.
