= Zumaglia Castle =

- Castello di Zumaglia
- Zumaglia and Ronco Biellese
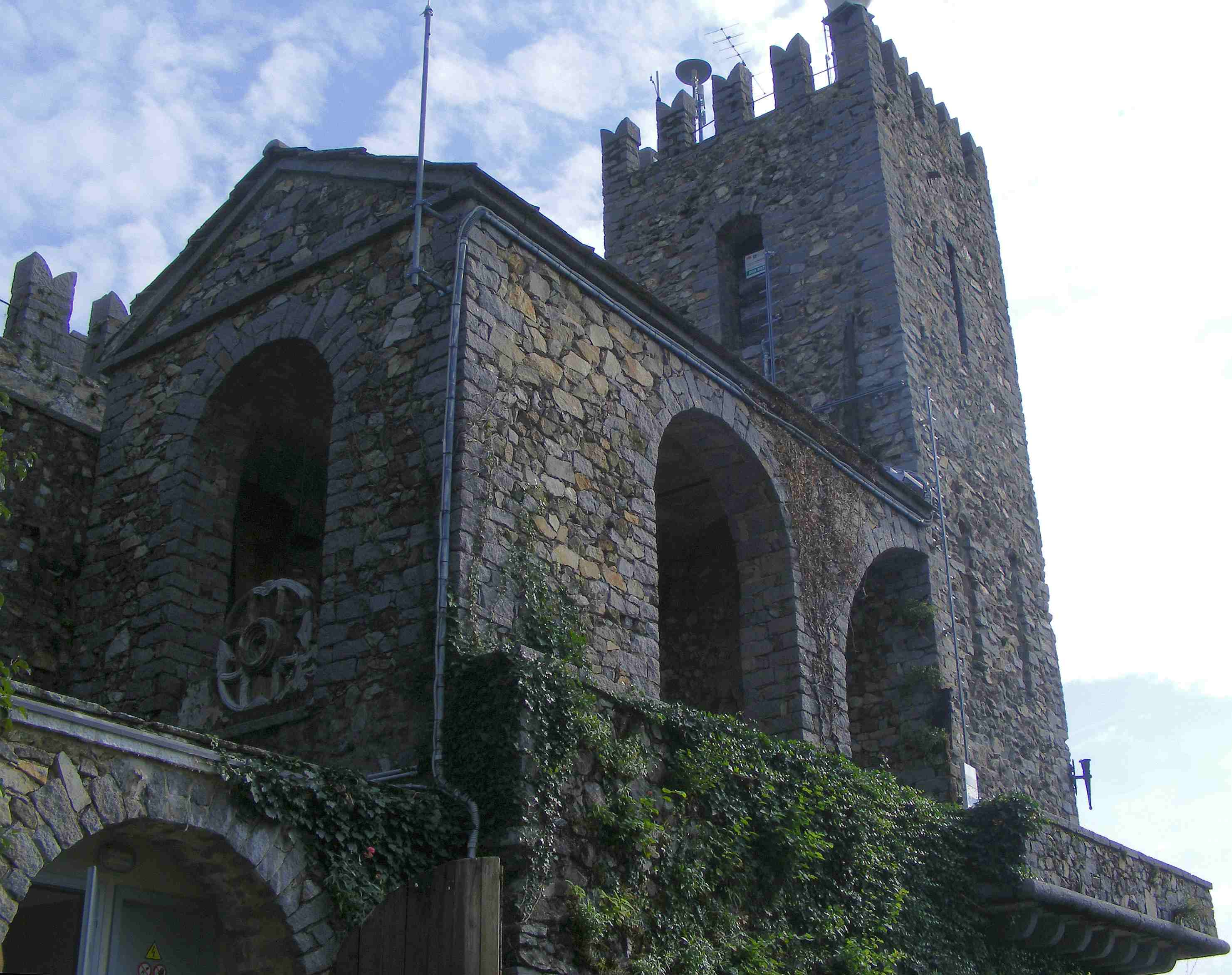
- Zumaglia Castle, view from the north

Site information
- Type: Castle

Location
- Coordinates: 45°35′09″N 8°05′33″E

Site history
- Built: 13th century

Zumaglia Castle (Italian: Castello di Zumaglia) is a medieval castle located at the top of Brich di Zumaglia on the borders of the communes of Zumaglia and Ronco Biellese in the Province of Biella, Italy.

== History ==
The castle was built in 1291 on the site of a previous construction. It was reinforced around 1329 by order of the bishop of Vercelli Lombardo della Torre. It was destroyed in an attack by Henry II of France in 1556, and rebuilt in 1937 by count Vittorio Buratti. The surrounding areas of Brich di Zumaglia and Mont Prève were established in 1995.

== Area ==
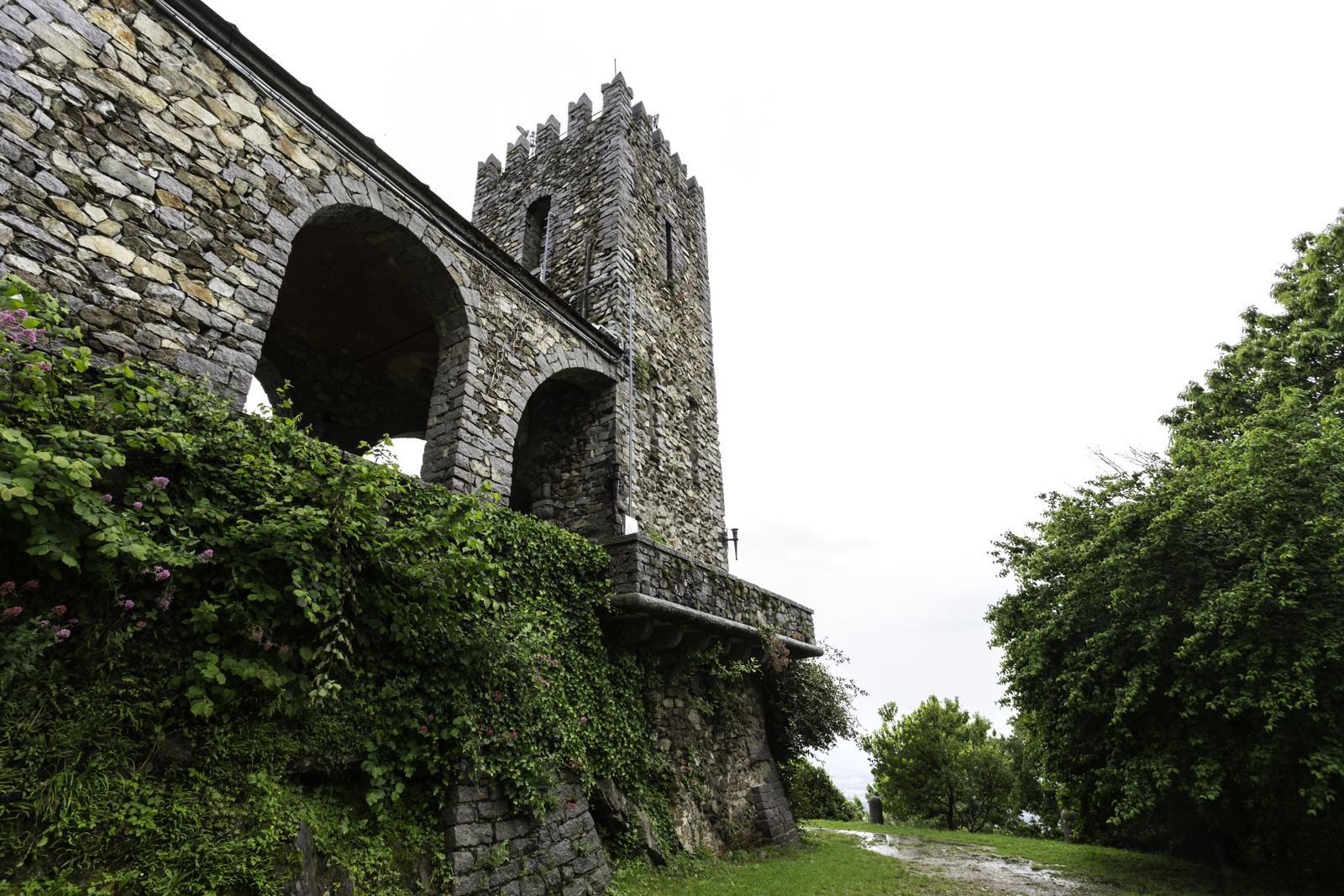
Brich di Zumaglia

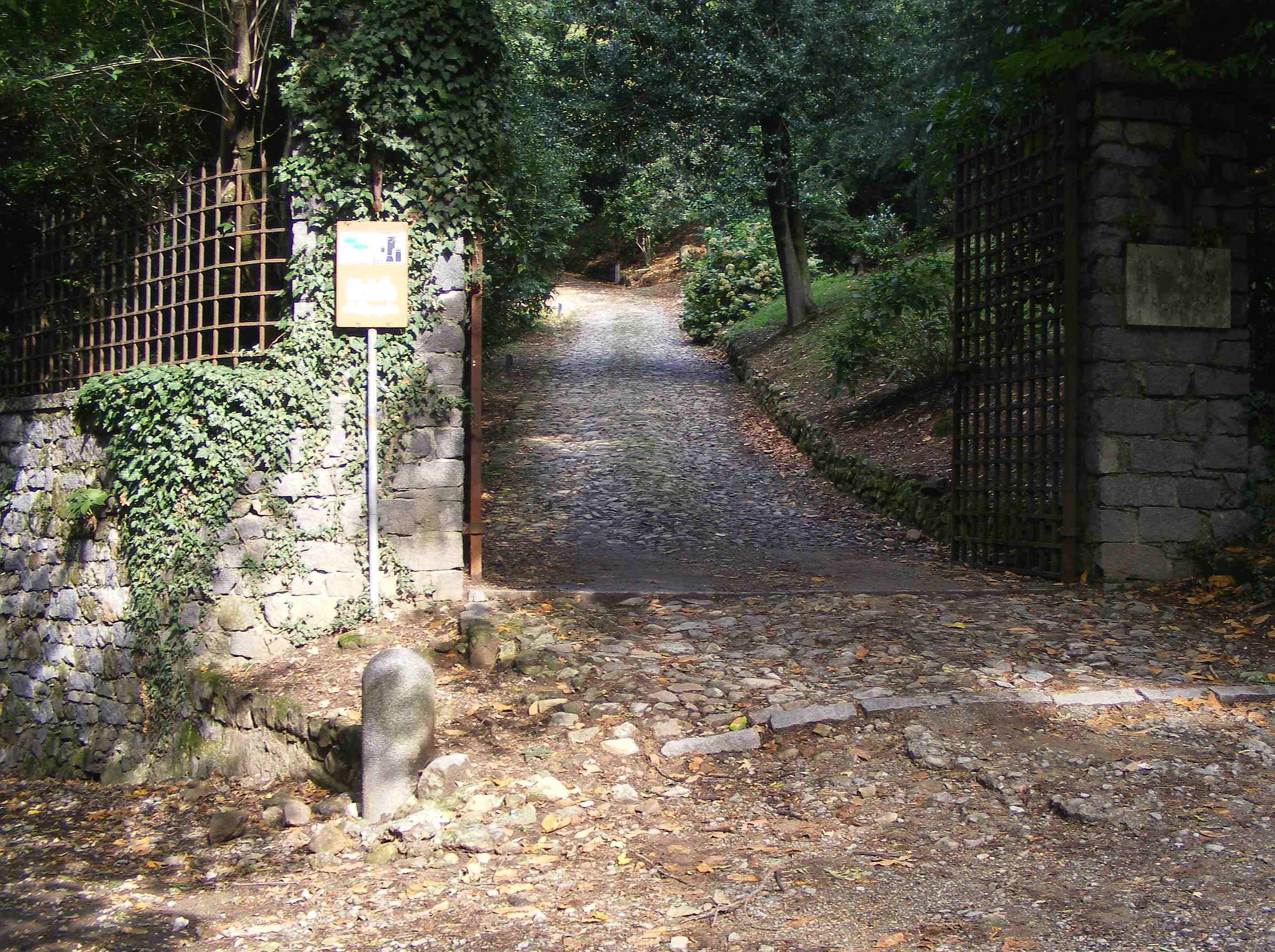
Park entrance

The building is accessible on foot from 2 cobbled paths and a dirt road that go up either side from the Ronco Biellese sports center, or from the area separating Brich di Zumaglia from Mont Prevè. The Grande Traversata del Biellese, a 234 km hiking trail, also passes through the area.

The castle, which has been managed since June 2013 by a.r.s. Teatrando (a theater company), is used for events, exhibitions, receptions, music and cultural activities, including a touring theater festival by the company itself each summer.

== See also ==
- List of castles in Italy
