= Balocco =

- Comune
- Comune di Balocco
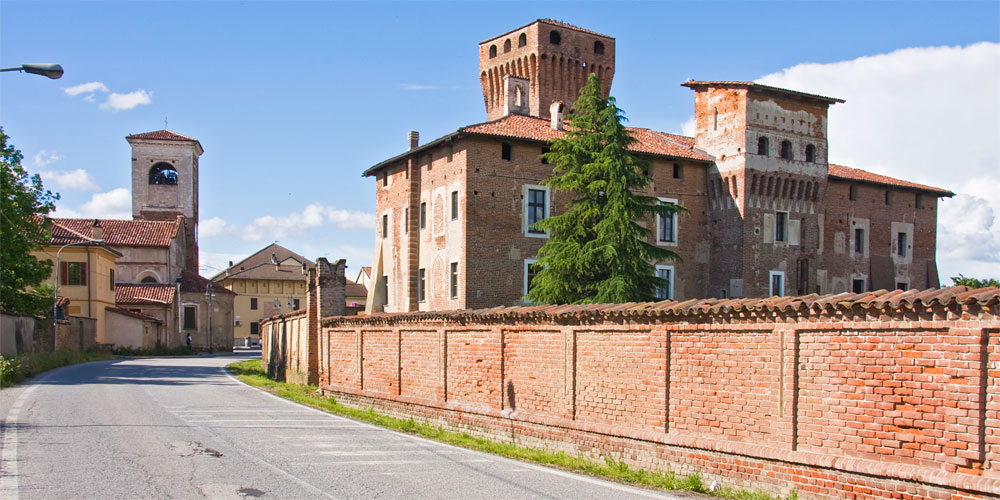
- View of Balocco with the castle and church.

- Location within Italy Location within Piedmont
- Coordinates: 45°27′N 8°17′E
- Country: Italy
- Region: Piedmont
- Province: Province of Vercelli (VC)

Government
  - Mayor: Piermario Pedruzzi

Area
  - Total: 16.7 km^{2} (6.4 sq mi)

Population (Dec. 2004)
  - Total: 273
  - Density: 16.3/km^{2} (42.3/sq mi)
- Time zone: UTC+1 (CET)
  - Summer (DST): UTC+2 (CEST)
- Postal code: 13040
- Dialing code: 0161

Balocco is a comune (municipality) in the Province of Vercelli in the Italian region Piedmont, located about 60 kilometres (37 mi) northeast of Turin and about 20 kilometres (12 mi) northwest of Vercelli. As of 31 December 2004, it had a population of 273 and an area of 16.7 square kilometres (6.4 mi^{2}). It is home to Balocco Castle and the Circuito di Balocco road-testing track.

Balocco borders the following municipalities: Buronzo, Carisio, Formigliana, San Giacomo Vercellese, and Villarboit.

== Demographic evolution ==
Historical population

Year	Pop.	±%
1861	727	—
1871	892	+22.7%
1881	887	−0.6%
1901	1,045	+17.8%
1911	986	−5.6%

Year	Pop.	±%
1921	808	−18.1%
1931	779	−3.6%
1936	735	−5.6%
1951	811	+10.3%
1961	484	−40.3%

Year	Pop.	±%
1971	387	−20.0%
1981	339	−12.4%
1991	267	−21.2%
2001	262	−1.9%

Source: Data from ISTAT

== Economy ==
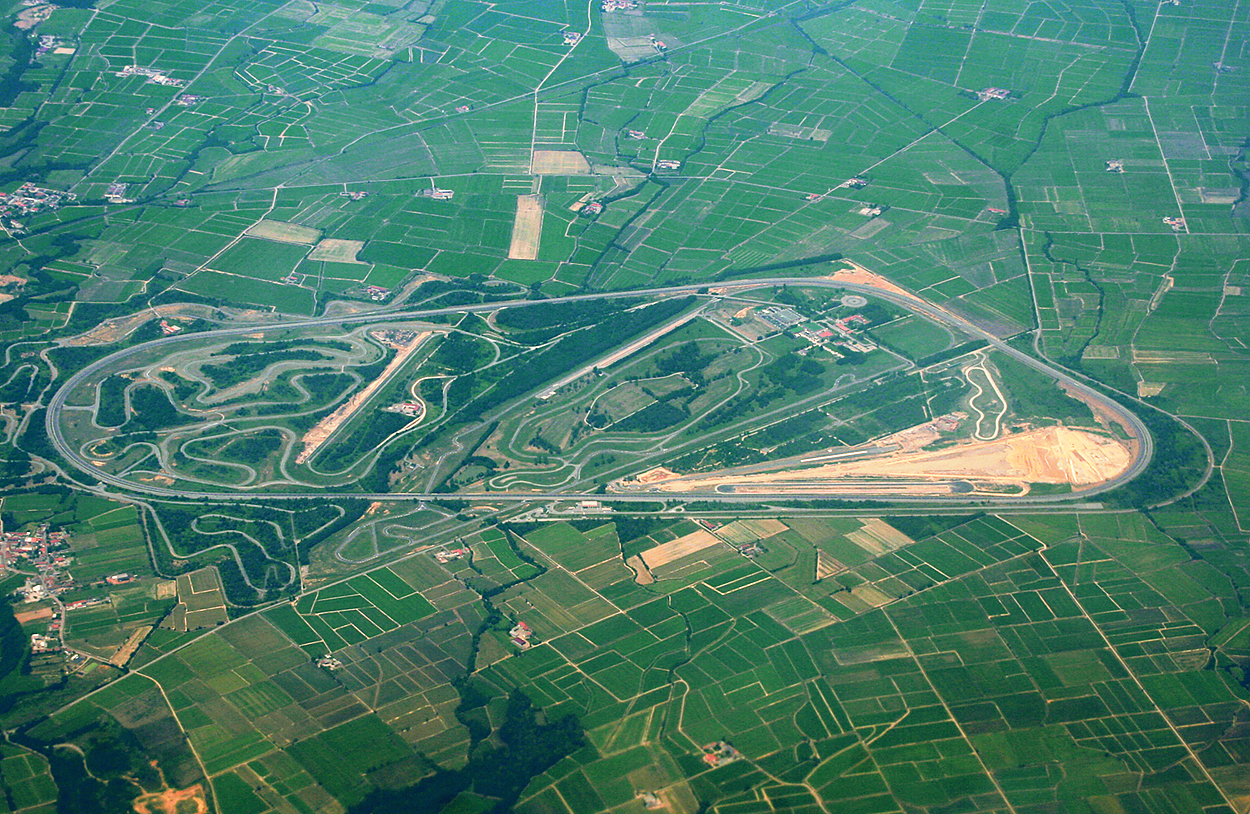
Circuito di Balocco

The main activity is agriculture: rice farming, corn and wheat . The motorway nearby has favored the settlement of industrial companies.

=== Circuito di Balocco ===
Balocco is the seat of the major proving ground of FCA Italy. The Circuito di Balocco test track was built in the early 1960s by Alfa Romeo for testing new cars, prototypes and racing cars. In the track is also hosted club and racing organization events. The track area exceeds 5,000,000 square metres (1,200 acres) and it has over 65 kilometres (40 mi) of different types of test tracks.
