= Balocco Castle =

Castle in Piedmont, Italy

- Castello di Balocco
- Balocco, Piedmont, Italy
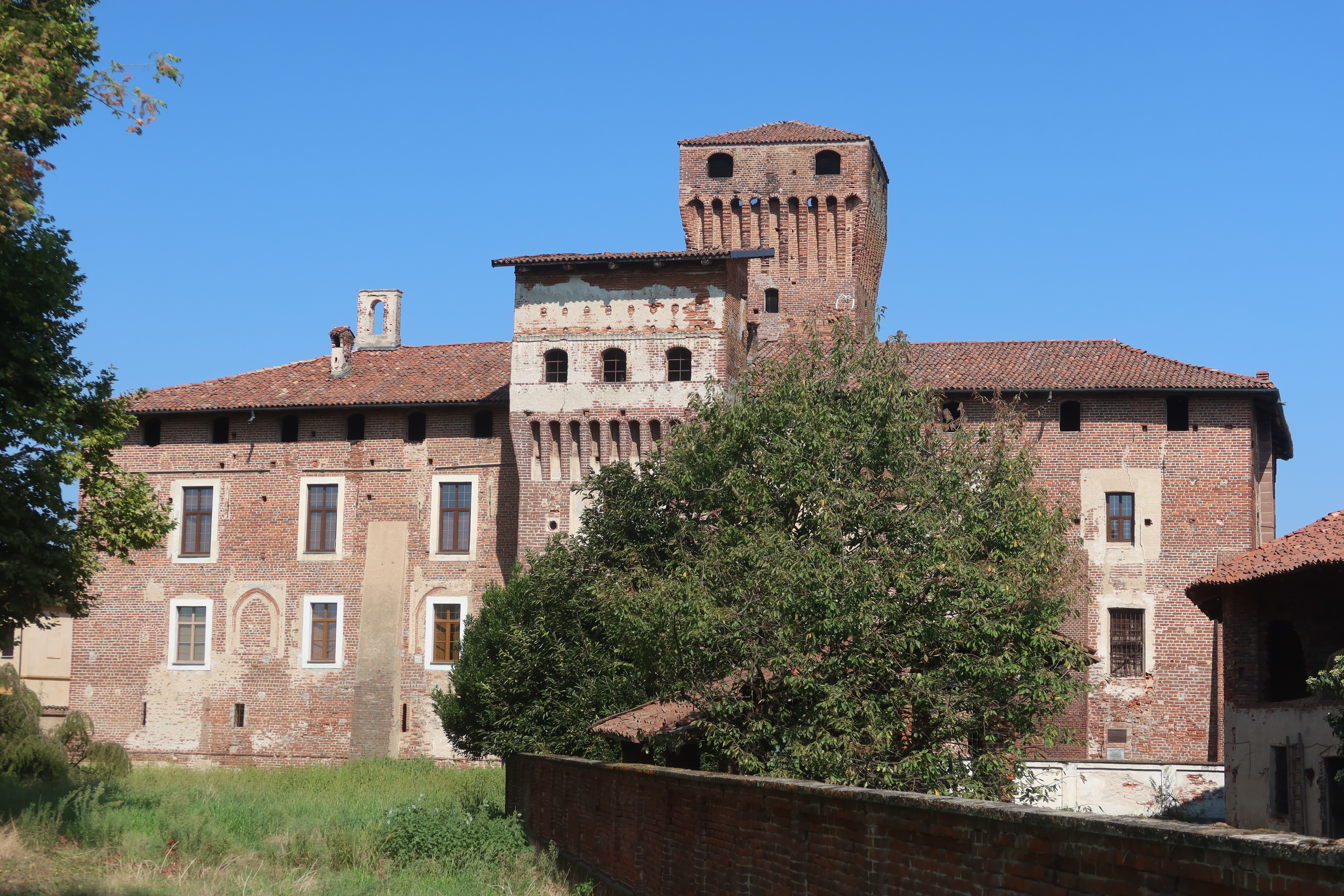
- Balocco Castle in 2025

Site information
- Type: Castle

Location
- Coordinates: 45°27′17.77″N 8°16′53.52″E

Balocco Castle (Italian: Castello di Balocco) is a castle located in Balocco, Piedmont, Italy.

== History ==
The origins of the castle date back to around the year 1000, when it was established as a ricetto (refuge), as attested by a document from 1186. Within its walls stood the parish church of San Michele and probably the surrounding village. At this stage, the castle belonged to the Confalonieri family of Balocco, whose earliest known member was Eustachio, mentioned in a document from 1124.

Towards the end of the 13th century, the lords of Buronzo also acquired rights over the fief, obtaining the investiture of half the castle in 1328. In 1335 Balocco came under the control of the Visconti, and in 1357 it suffered devastation at the hands of Ugolino Gonzaga. In 1373 the Confalonieri and the Buronzo submitted to the House of Savoy, and in 1378 the town became part of the Santhià captaincy.

In 1413 the castle was set on fire and destroyed by the Rovasenda, vassals of the Marquises of Montferrat. Rebuilt in 1423, from 1427 the castle and the village came permanently under Savoy rule. In 1601 part of the fief passed to Claudio Curtet and later to Giuseppe Pramaggiore; in 1622 Spanish troops plundered the settlement. From 1635 the property belonged to Giovanni Francesco Buronzo della Donne, and from 1750 to Marco Antonio Nasi, son of Lodovica Maria Plebano.

== Description ==
The castle, in its present form largely dating from the 15th century, preserves the entrance tower, sections of the curtain wall, and the remains of two eastern towers, one square and one circular. The original entrance, located on the southern side, has today been shifted to the north. The keep displays elements that appear to predate the 15th-century reconstructions. The surviving structures, forming the core of the manorial enclosure, were likely connected to a moat and to walls that enclosed the church of San Michele and part of the village. To the east stands a small 15th-century farmhouse, indicating the probable presence of a settlement annexed to the fortified complex.

== Gallery ==
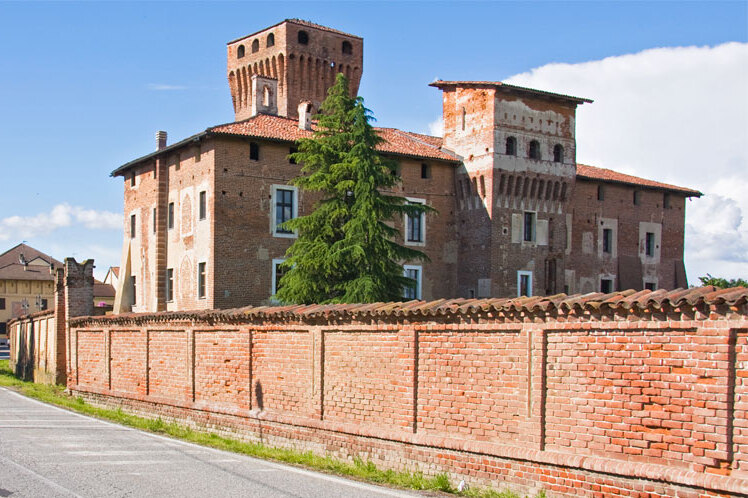

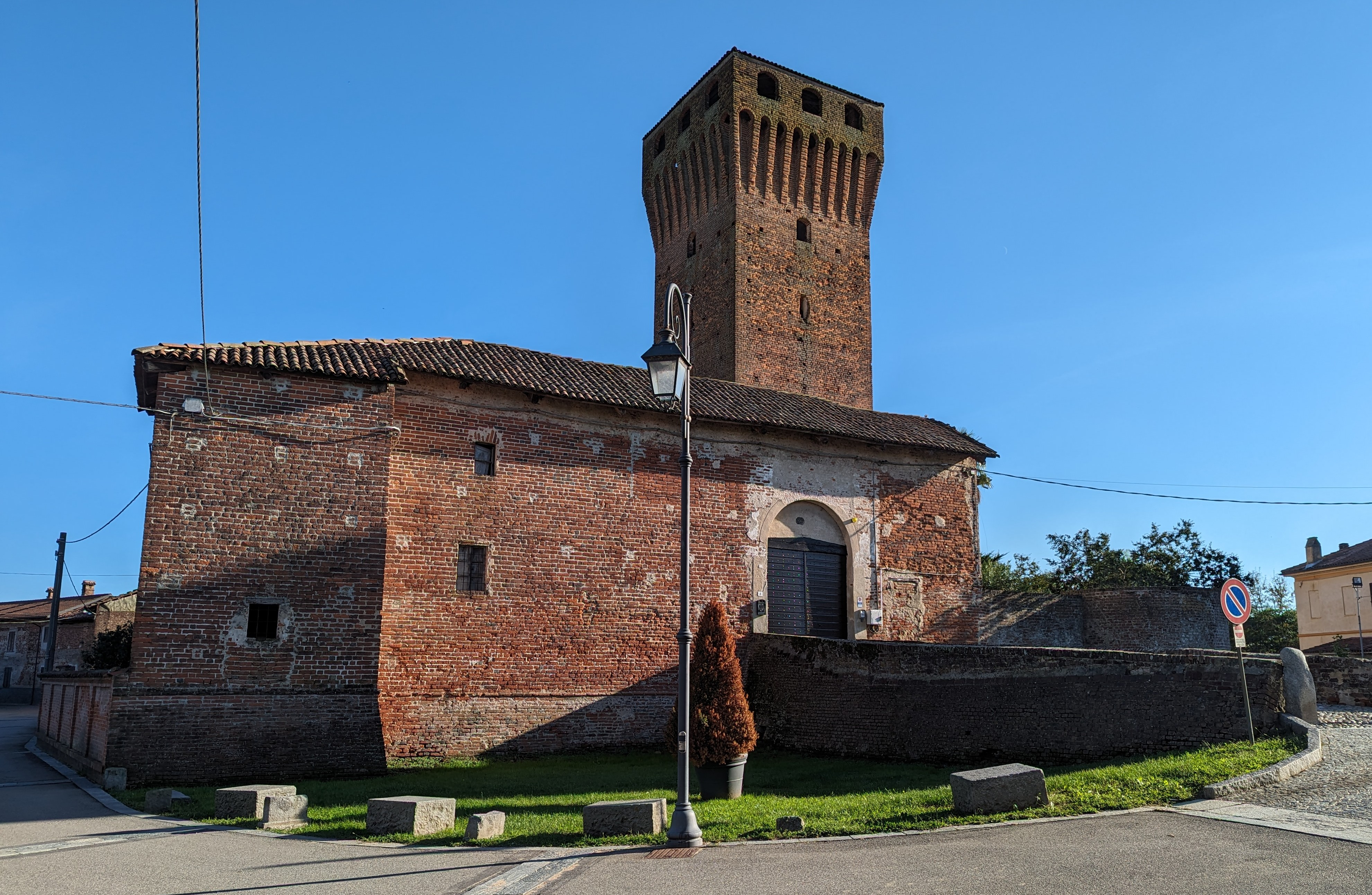

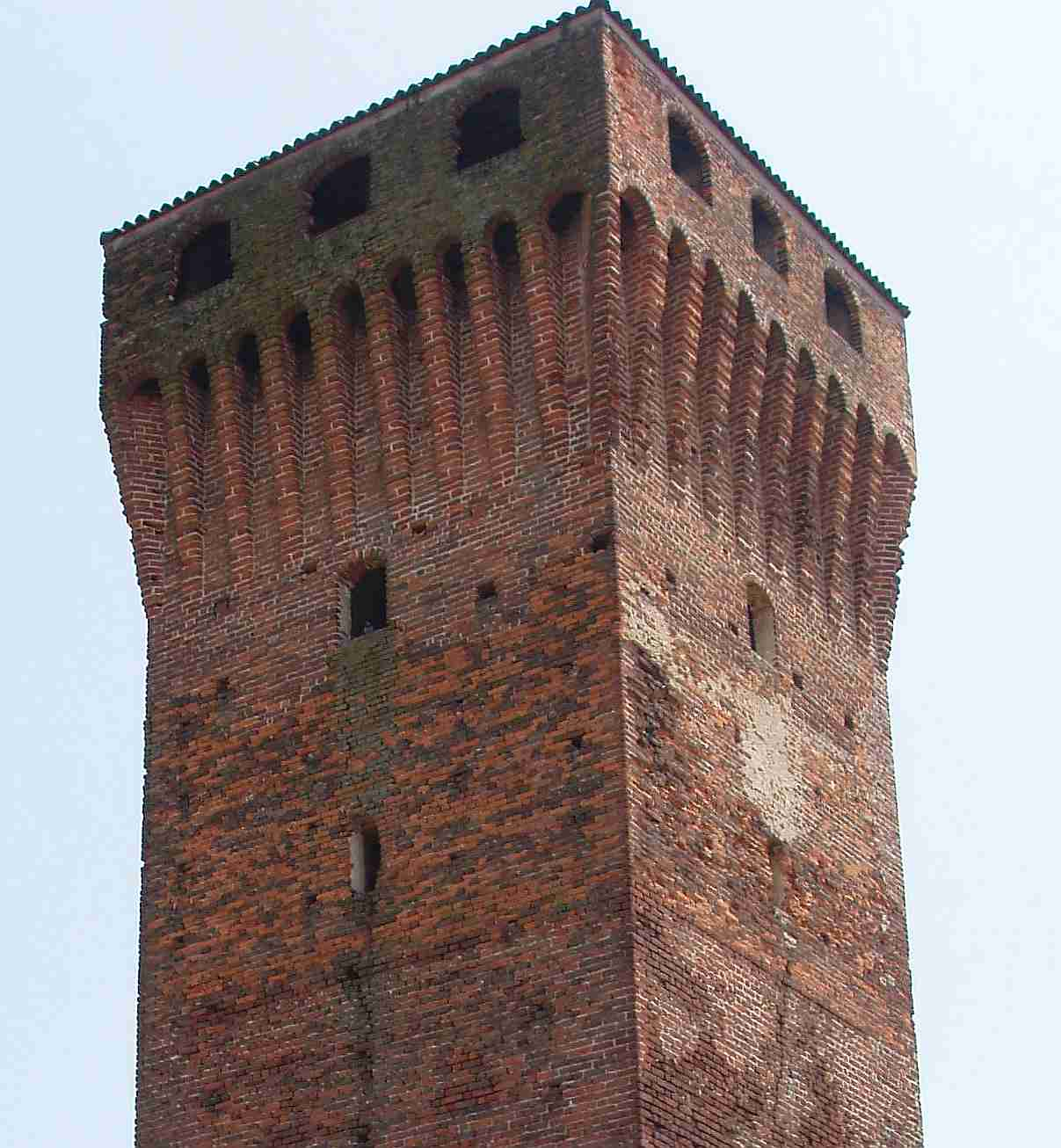
