= Cavaglià =

Cavaglià Cavajà (Piedmontese)
- Comune
- Comune di Cavaglià
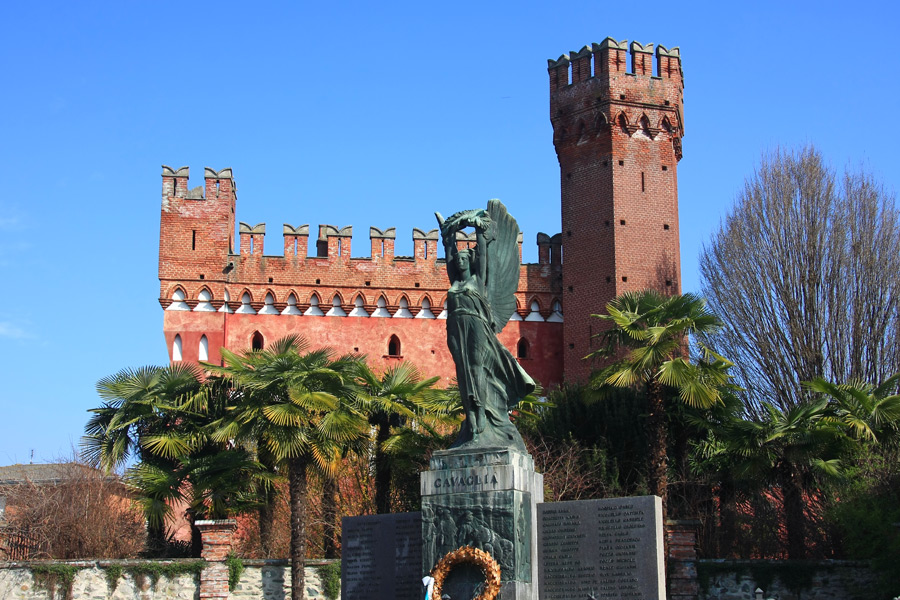
- View of Cavaglià

- Coat of arms

- Location within Italy Location within Piedmont
- Coordinates: 45°24′N 8°5′E
- Country: Italy
- Region: Piedmont
- Province: Biella (BI)

Government
  - Mayor: Giancarlo Borsoi

Area
  - Total: 25.5 km^{2} (9.8 sq mi)
- Elevation: 271 m (889 ft)

Population (31 December 2010)
  - Total: 3,623
  - Density: 142/km^{2} (368/sq mi)
- Demonym: Cavagliesi
- Time zone: UTC+1 (CET)
  - Summer (DST): UTC+2 (CEST)
- Postal code: 13881
- Dialing code: 0161
- Patron saint: St. Michael Archangel
- Website: Official website

Cavaglià (Italian: [kavaʎˈʎa]; Piedmontese: Cavajà) is a comune (municipality) in the Province of Biella in the Italian region of Piedmont, located about 50 kilometres (31 mi) northeast of Turin and about 20 kilometres (12 mi) south of Biella.

Cavaglià borders the following municipalities: Alice Castello, Carisio, Dorzano, Roppolo, Salussola, Santhià. Sights include Rondolino Castle, the Baroque church of St. Michael Archangel, the neo-Renaissance church of Santa Maria di Babilone, and an archaeological site with menhirs from as early as the Iron Age.

== Twin towns and sister cities ==
Cavaglià is twinned with:

- Montbazin, France (2013)
