= Gifflenga =

- Comune
- Comune di Gifflenga
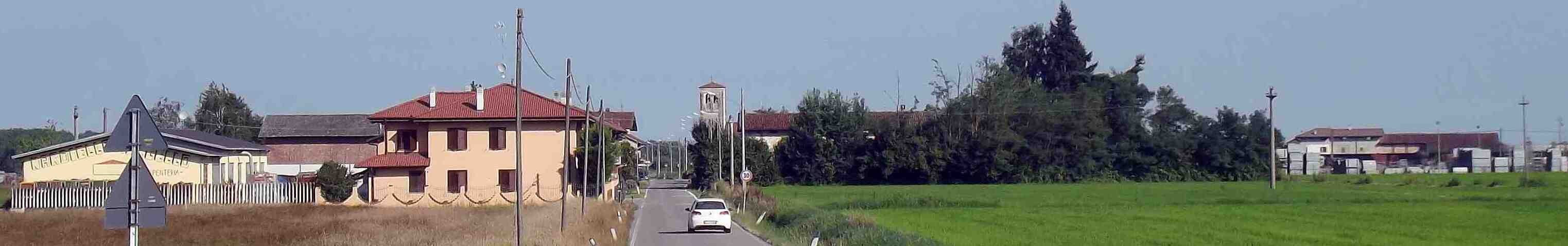
- View of Gifflenga

- Location within Italy Location within Piedmont
- Coordinates: 45°29′N 8°16′E
- Country: Italy
- Region: Piedmont
- Province: Biella (BI)

Government
  - Mayor: Elisa Pollero

Area
  - Total: 2.3 km^{2} (0.89 sq mi)
- Elevation: 187 m (614 ft)

Population (31 December 2021)
  - Total: 104
  - Density: 45/km^{2} (120/sq mi)
- Demonym: Gifflenghesi
- Time zone: UTC+1 (CET)
  - Summer (DST): UTC+2 (CEST)
- Postal code: 13030
- Dialing code: 0161

Gifflenga is a comune (municipality) in the Province of Biella in the Italian region Piedmont, located about 60 kilometres (37 mi) northeast of Turin and about 20 kilometres (12 mi) southeast of Biella.

Gifflenga borders the following municipalities: Buronzo, Castelletto Cervo, Mottalciata.
