= Formigliana =

- Comune
- Comune di Formigliana
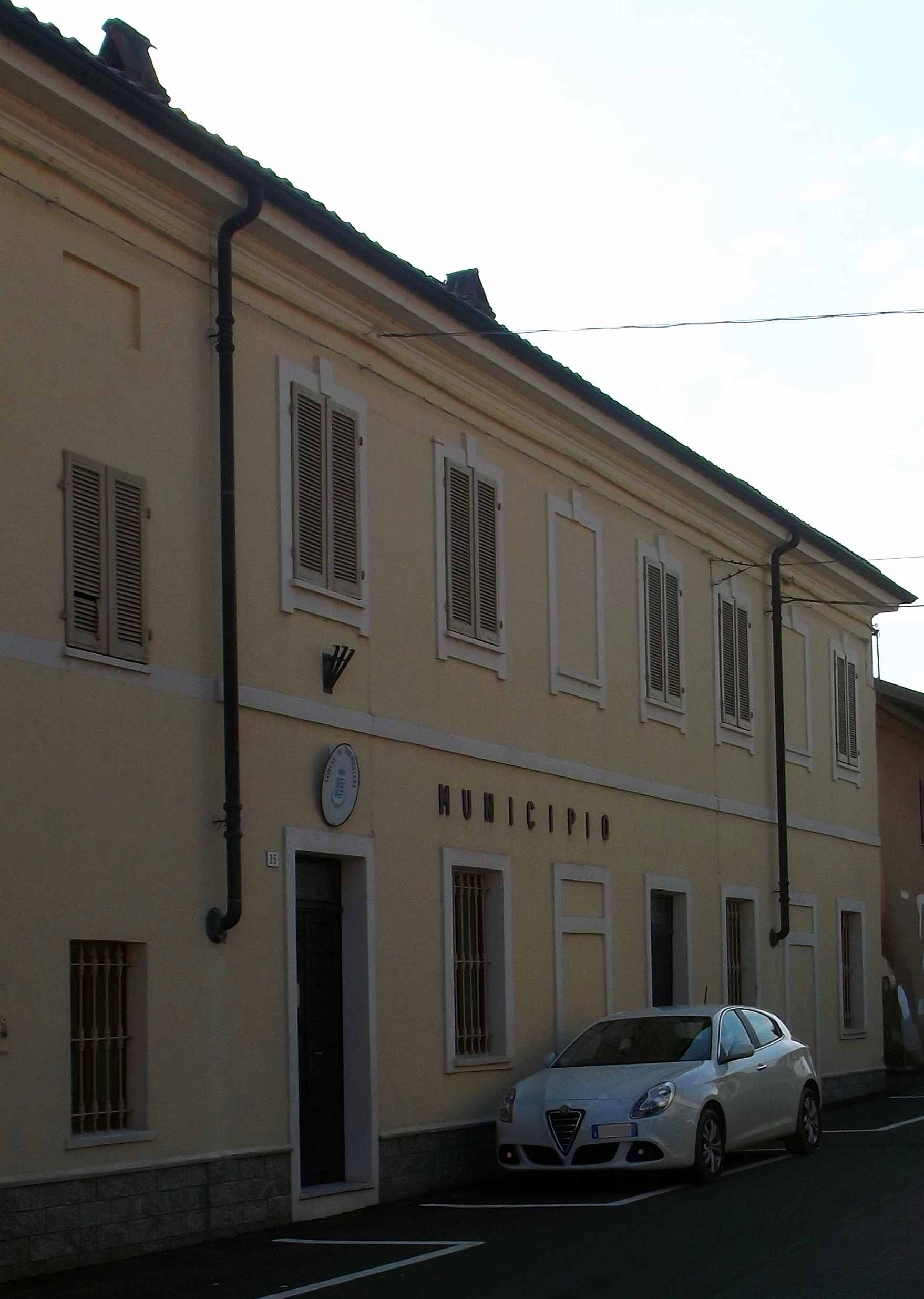
- Town hall

- Location within Italy Location within Piedmont
- Coordinates: 45°26′N 8°17′E
- Country: Italy
- Region: Piedmont
- Province: Province of Vercelli (VC)

Government
  - Mayor: Antonio Ruffino

Area
  - Total: 17.1 km^{2} (6.6 sq mi)

Population (Dec. 2004)
  - Total: 548
  - Density: 32.0/km^{2} (83.0/sq mi)
- Time zone: UTC+1 (CET)
  - Summer (DST): UTC+2 (CEST)
- Postal code: 13030
- Dialing code: 0161

Formigliana is a comune (municipality) in the Province of Vercelli in the Italian region Piedmont, located about 60 kilometres (37 mi) northeast of Turin and about 15 kilometres (9 mi) northwest of Vercelli. As of 31 December 2004, it had a population of 548 and an area of 17.1 square kilometres (6.6 mi^{2}).

Formigliana borders the following municipalities: Balocco, Carisio, Casanova Elvo, Santhià, and Villarboit.

== Demographic evolution ==
Historical population

Year	Pop.	±%
1861	492	—
1871	623	+26.6%
1881	717	+15.1%
1901	980	+36.7%
1911	945	−3.6%

Year	Pop.	±%
1921	821	−13.1%
1931	710	−13.5%
1936	739	+4.1%
1951	754	+2.0%
1961	809	+7.3%

Year	Pop.	±%
1971	664	−17.9%
1981	677	+2.0%
1991	625	−7.7%
2001	561	−10.2%

Source: Data from ISTAT
