= Salussola =

- Comune
- Comune di Salussola
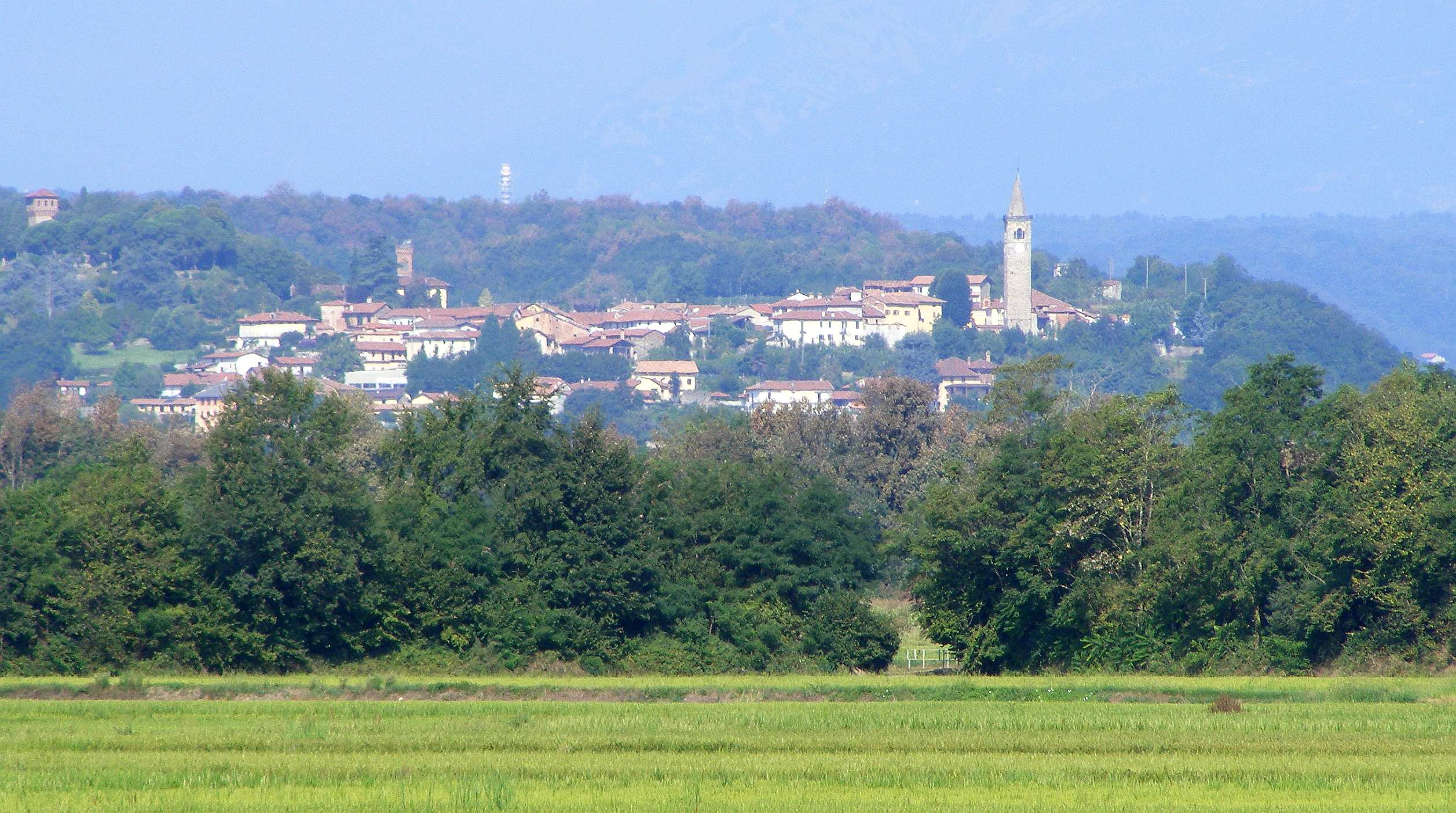
- View of Salussola

- Coat of arms

- Location within Italy Location within Piedmont
- Coordinates: 45°27′N 8°7′E
- Country: Italy
- Region: Piedmont
- Province: Biella (BI)
- Frazioni: Arro, San Secondo, Vigellio

Government
  - Mayor: Carlo Cabrio

Area
  - Total: 39.4 km^{2} (15.2 sq mi)
- Elevation: 289 m (948 ft)

Population (31 December 2010)
  - Total: 2,085
  - Density: 52.9/km^{2} (137/sq mi)
- Demonym: Salussolesi
- Time zone: UTC+1 (CET)
  - Summer (DST): UTC+2 (CEST)
- Postal code: 13060
- Dialing code: 0161
- Website: Official website

Salussola is a comune (municipality) in the Province of Biella in the Italian region Piedmont, located about 50 kilometres (31 mi) northeast of Turin and about 14 kilometres (9 mi) southeast of Biella.

Salussola borders the following municipalities: Carisio, Cavaglià, Cerrione, Dorzano, Massazza, Roppolo, Verrone, Villanova Biellese.

In the last days of World War II, in Salussola was perpetrated a massacre where 20 partisans were murdered by Italian Fascist Soldiers.
