= Rondolino Castle =

Castle in Piedmont, Italy

- Castello Rondolino
- Cavaglià, Piedmont, Italy
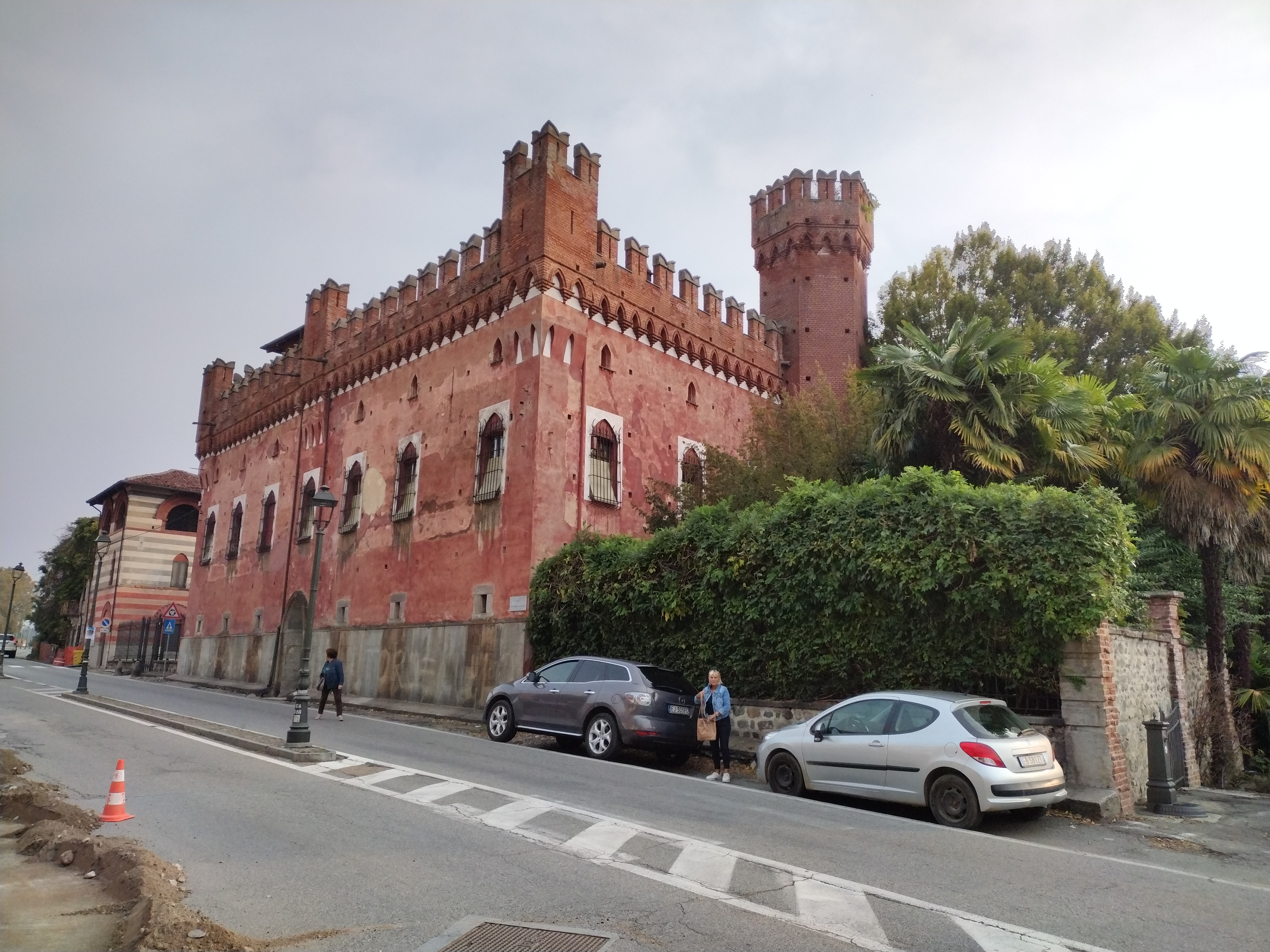
- Roppolo Castle in 2022

Site information
- Type: Castle

Location
- Coordinates: 45°24′24.62″N 8°05′41.79″E

Rondolino Castle (Italian: Castello Rondolino) is a castle located in Cavaglià, Piedmont, Italy.

== History ==
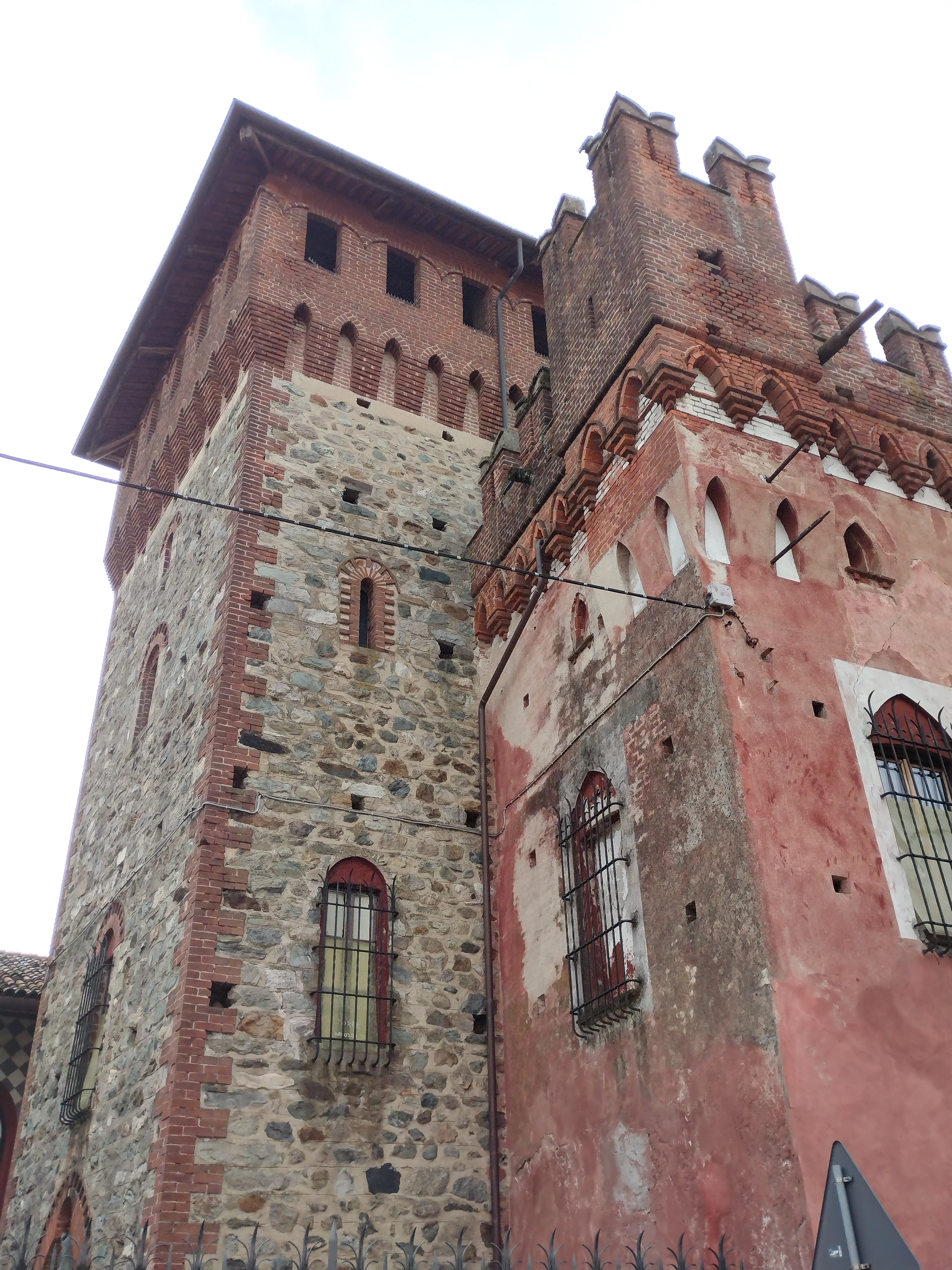
The main tower

The castle is the result of a neo-medieval reconstruction carried out at the end of the 19th century at the request of the Rondolino family.

== Description ==
The building consists of three sections: a central quadrangular structure, a tower, and a separate but connected structure that resembles a rural courtyard. The central section and the tower are characterized by battlements.
