= Villanova Biellese =

- Comune
- Comune di Villanova Biellese
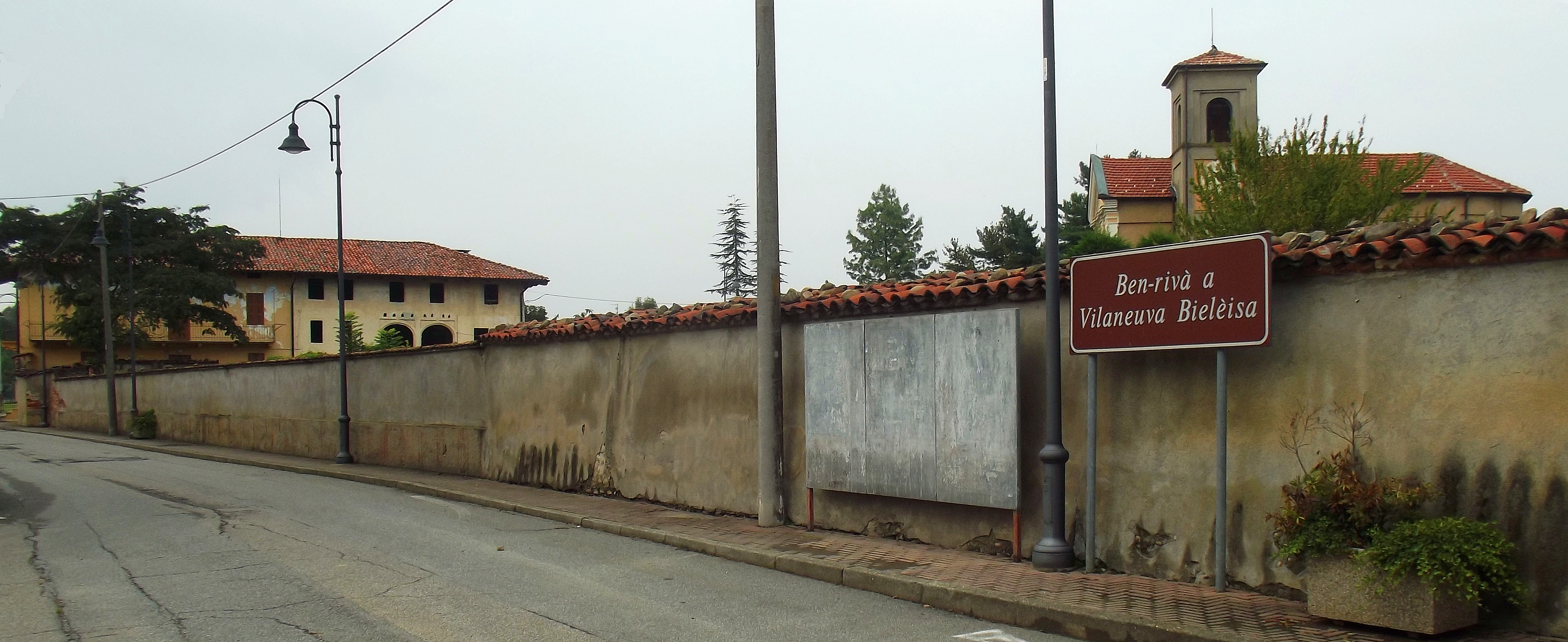
- View of Villanova Biellese

- Location within Italy Location within Piedmont
- Coordinates: 45°25′N 8°12′E
- Country: Italy
- Region: Piedmont
- Province: Biella (BI)

Government
  - Mayor: Giovanni Mangiaracina

Area
  - Total: 7.7 km^{2} (3.0 sq mi)
- Elevation: 232 m (761 ft)

Population (Dec. 2004)
  - Total: 185
  - Density: 24/km^{2} (62/sq mi)
- Demonym: Villanovesi
- Time zone: UTC+1 (CET)
  - Summer (DST): UTC+2 (CEST)
- Postal code: 13030
- Dialing code: 0161
- Website: Official website

Villanova Biellese is a comune (municipality) in the Province of Biella in the Italian region Piedmont, located about 60 kilometres (37 mi) northeast of Turin and about 20 kilometres (12 mi) southeast of Biella.

Villanova Biellese borders the following municipalities: Buronzo, Carisio, Massazza, Mottalciata, Salussola.
