= Castelletto Cervo =

Castelletto Cervo Castlet
- Comune
- Comune di Castelletto Cervo
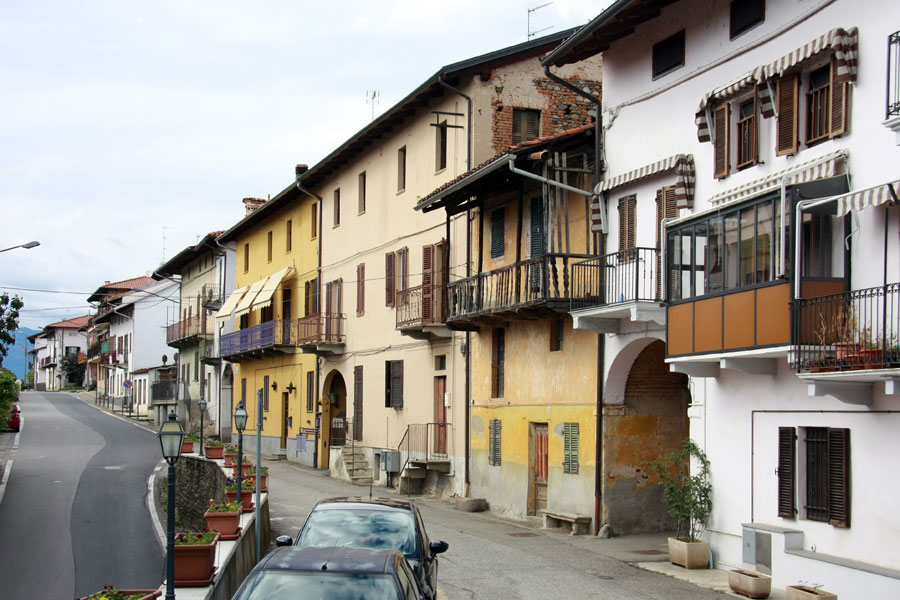
- View of Castelletto Cervo

- Coat of arms

- Location within Italy Location within Piedmont
- Coordinates: 45°29′N 8°16′E
- Country: Italy
- Region: Piedmont
- Province: Biella (BI)

Government
  - Mayor: Renzo Selva

Area
  - Total: 15.0 km^{2} (5.8 sq mi)
- Elevation: 216 m (709 ft)

Population (30 November 2025)
  - Total: 759
  - Density: 50.6/km^{2} (131/sq mi)
- Demonym: Castellettesi
- Time zone: UTC+1 (CET)
  - Summer (DST): UTC+2 (CEST)
- Postal code: 13040
- Dialing code: 0161
- ISTAT code: 096015
- Website: Official website

Castelletto Cervo is a comune (municipality) in the Province of Biella in the Italian region Piedmont, located about 60 kilometres (37 mi) northeast of Turin and about 20 kilometres (12 mi) southeast of Biella.

Castelletto Cervo borders the municipalities of Buronzo, Gifflenga, Lessona, Masserano, and Mottalciata.

== Main sights ==
- Castle, dating to c. 13th century
- Parish church
- Romanesque monastic complex of San Pietro di Castelletto, built in 1087-1092.
