= Mottalciata =

- Comune
- Comune di Mottalciata
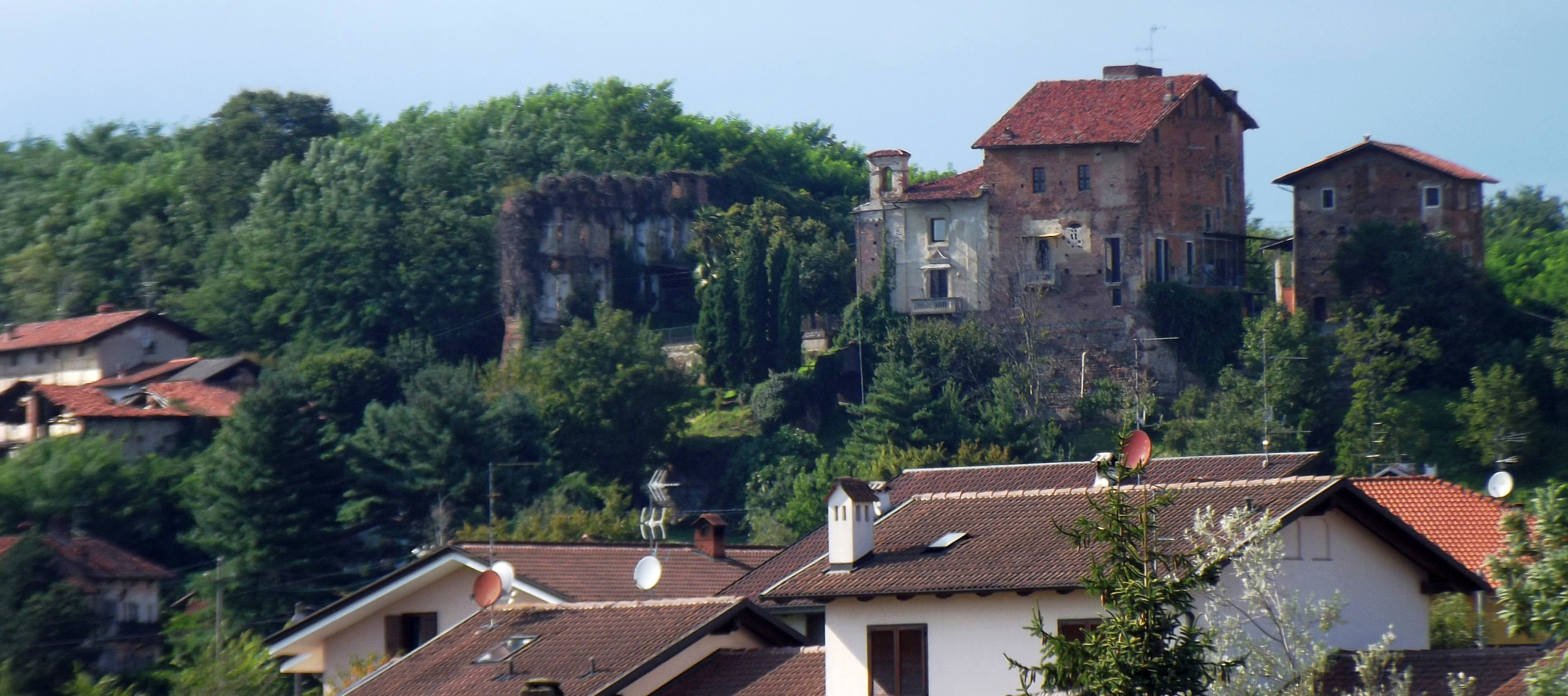
- View of Mottalciata

- Location within Italy Location within Piedmont
- Coordinates: 45°29′N 8°16′E
- Country: Italy
- Region: Piedmont
- Province: Province of Biella (BI)

Area
  - Total: 18.5 km^{2} (7.1 sq mi)

Population (Dec. 2004)
  - Total: 1,445
  - Density: 78.1/km^{2} (202/sq mi)
- Time zone: UTC+1 (CET)
  - Summer (DST): UTC+2 (CEST)
- Postal code: 13030
- Dialing code: 0161

Mottalciata is a comune (municipality) in the Province of Biella in the Italian region Piedmont, located about 60 kilometres (37 mi) northeast of Turin and about 20 kilometres (12 mi) southeast of Biella. As of 31 December 2004, it had a population of 1,445 and an area of 18.5 square kilometres (7.1 mi^{2}).

Mottalciata borders the following municipalities: Benna, Buronzo, Castelletto Cervo, Cossato, Gifflenga, Lessona, Massazza, Villanova Biellese.

== Demographic evolution ==
Historical population

Year	Pop.	±%
1861	1,368	—
1871	1,511	+10.5%
1881	1,612	+6.7%
1901	1,849	+14.7%
1911	1,722	−6.9%

Year	Pop.	±%
1921	1,617	−6.1%
1931	1,471	−9.0%
1936	1,444	−1.8%
1951	1,433	−0.8%
1961	1,416	−1.2%

Year	Pop.	±%
1971	1,437	+1.5%
1981	1,455	+1.3%
1991	1,343	−7.7%
2001	1,416	+5.4%

Source: Data from ISTAT
