= Masserano =

- Comune
- Comune di Masserano
- Location within Italy Location within Piedmont
- Coordinates: 45°58′N 8°21′E
- Country: Italy
- Region: Piedmont
- Province: Province of Biella (BI)

Government
  - Mayor: Sergio Fantone from 06/08/2009

Area
  - Total: 27.1 km^{2} (10.5 sq mi)
- Elevation: 340 m (1,120 ft)

Population (Dec. 2004)
  - Total: 2,315
  - Density: 85.4/km^{2} (221/sq mi)
- Demonym: Masseranesi
- Time zone: UTC+1 (CET)
  - Summer (DST): UTC+2 (CEST)
- Postal code: 13063
- Dialing code: 015

Masserano is a comune (municipality) in the Province of Biella in the Italian region Piedmont, located about 70 kilometres (43 mi) northeast of Turin and about 12 kilometres (7 mi) northeast of Biella. As of 31 December 2004, it had a population of 2,315 and an area of 27.1 square kilometres (10.5 mi^{2}).

Masserano borders the following municipalities: Brusnengo, Buronzo, Casapinta, Castelletto Cervo, Curino, Lessona, Rovasenda.

== Demographic evolution ==
Historical population

Year	Pop.	±%
1861	3,608	—
1871	3,821	+5.9%
1881	3,790	−0.8%
1901	4,301	+13.5%
1911	4,201	−2.3%

Year	Pop.	±%
1921	3,887	−7.5%
1931	3,073	−20.9%
1936	3,012	−2.0%
1951	3,219	+6.9%
1961	3,041	−5.5%

Year	Pop.	±%
1971	2,585	−15.0%
1981	2,434	−5.8%
1991	2,283	−6.2%
2001	2,314	+1.4%

Source: Data from ISTAT
