= Verrone =

- Comune
- Comune di Verrone
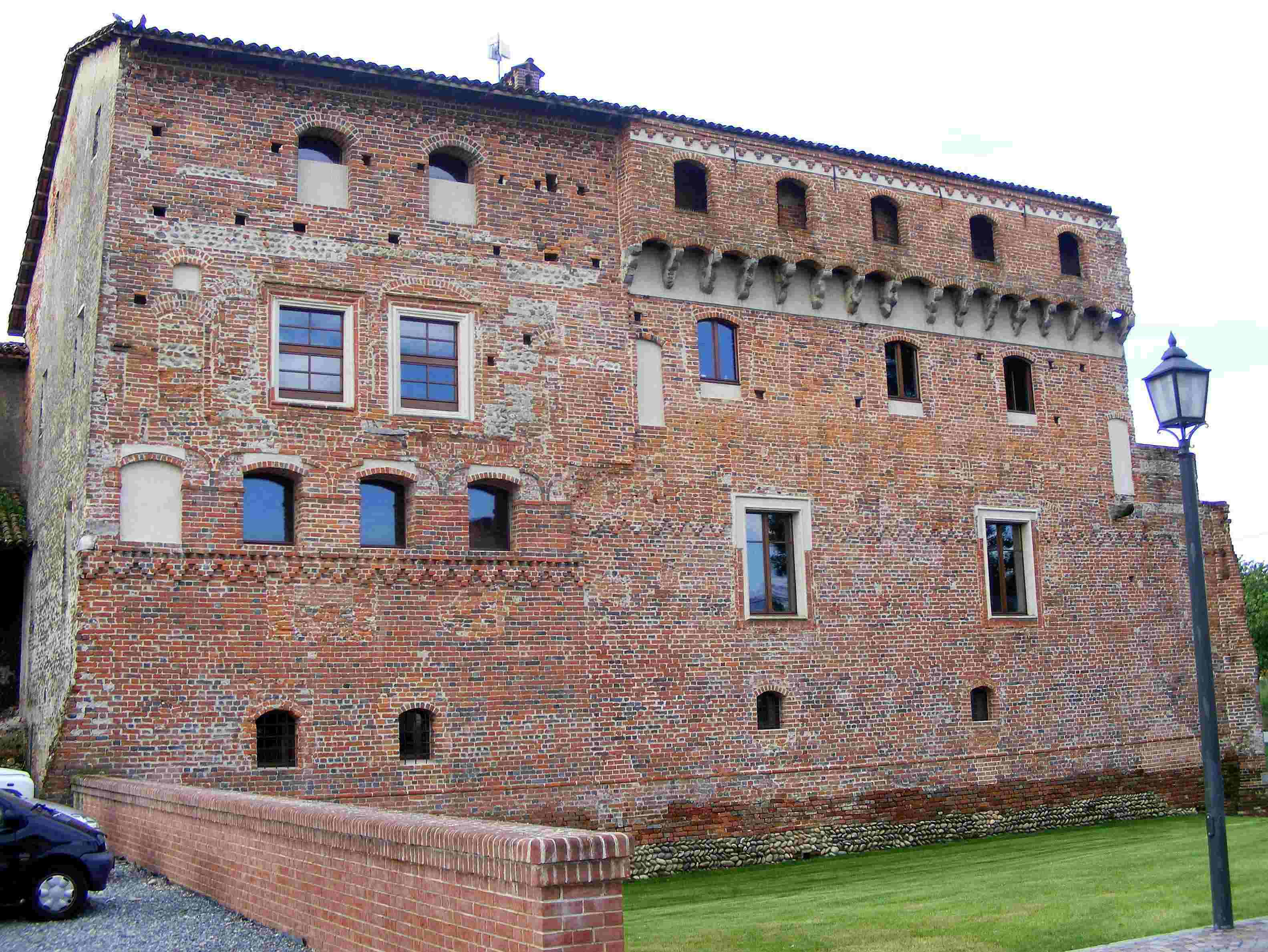
- View of Verrone

- Coat of arms

- Location within Italy Location within Piedmont
- Coordinates: 45°30′N 8°7′E
- Country: Italy
- Region: Piedmont
- Province: Biella (BI)

Government
  - Mayor: Cinzia Bossi

Area
  - Total: 8.5 km^{2} (3.3 sq mi)
- Elevation: 277 m (909 ft)

Population (30 September 2009)
  - Total: 1,219
  - Density: 140/km^{2} (370/sq mi)
- Demonym: Verronesi
- Time zone: UTC+1 (CET)
  - Summer (DST): UTC+2 (CEST)
- Postal code: 13871
- Dialing code: 015
- Website: Official website

Verrone is a comune (municipality) in the Province of Biella in the Italian region of Piedmont, located about 60 kilometres (37 mi) northeast of Turin and about 8 kilometres (5 mi) southeast of Biella.

Verrone borders the following municipalities: Benna, Candelo, Cerrione, Gaglianico, Massazza, Salussola, Sandigliano. Sights include the medieval castle (a complex of structures once owned by the Vialardi Ghibelline family), and the parish church of St. Lawrence, built from the 6th to the 10th century.
