= Benna, Piedmont =

Benna
- Comune
- Comune di Benna
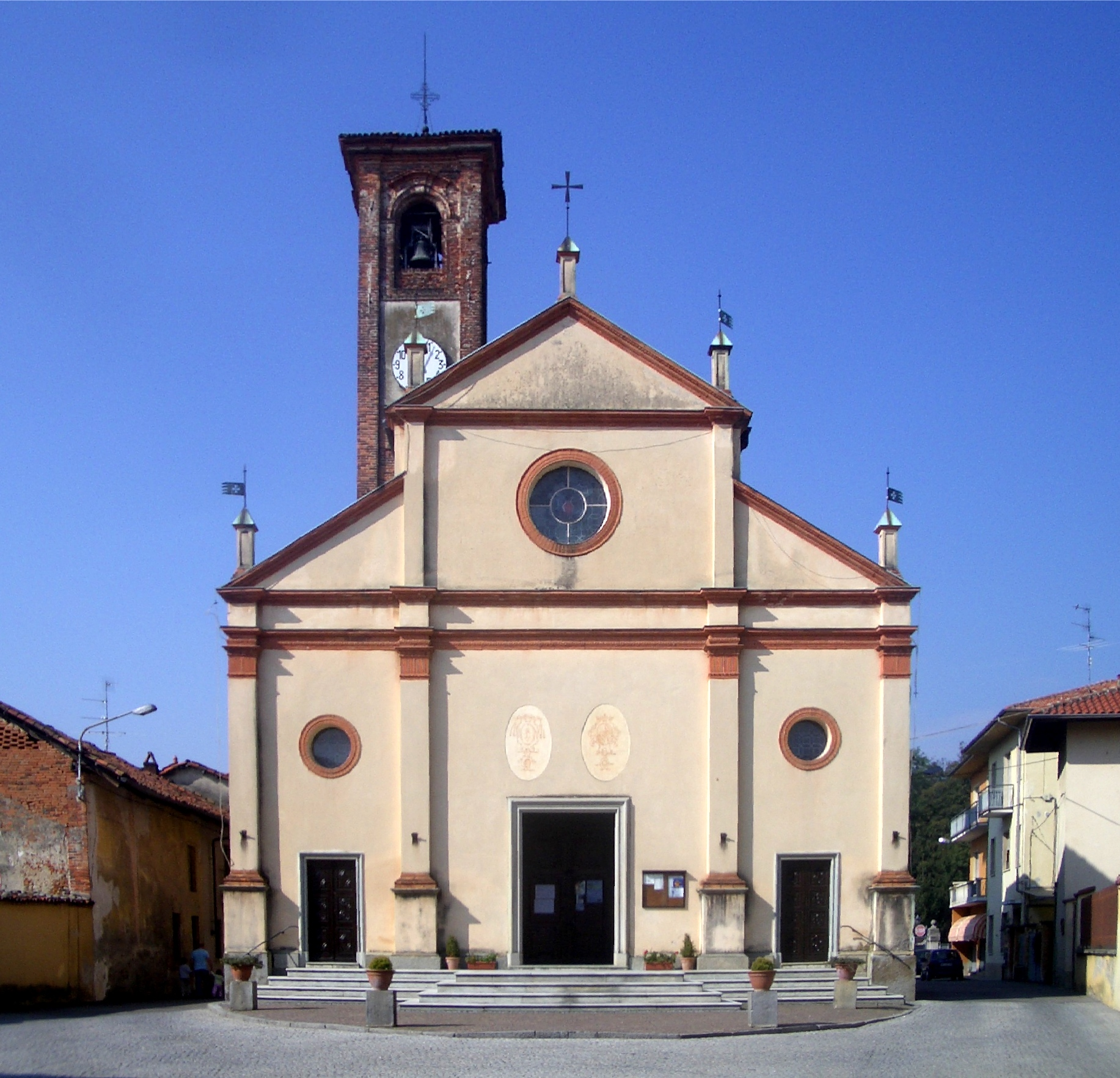
- Parish church of St. Peter

- Coat of arms

- Location within Italy Location within Piedmont
- Coordinates: 45°33′N 8°7′E
- Country: Italy
- Region: Piedmont
- Province: Biella (BI)

Government
  - Mayor: Cristina Sitzia

Area
  - Total: 9.4 km^{2} (3.6 sq mi)
- Elevation: 277 m (909 ft)

Population (30 September 2010)
  - Total: 1,170
  - Density: 120/km^{2} (320/sq mi)
- Demonym: Bennesi
- Time zone: UTC+1 (CET)
  - Summer (DST): UTC+2 (CEST)
- Postal code: 13871
- Dialing code: 015
- Patron saint: St. Peter
- Saint day: 29 June
- Website: Official website

Benna is a comune (municipality) in the Province of Biella in the Italian region Piedmont, located about 60 kilometres (37 mi) northeast of Turin and about 4 kilometres (2 mi) southeast of Biella.

Benna borders the following municipalities: Candelo, Cossato, Massazza, Mottalciata, Verrone.
