= Ronco Biellese =

- Comune
- Comune di Ronco Biellese
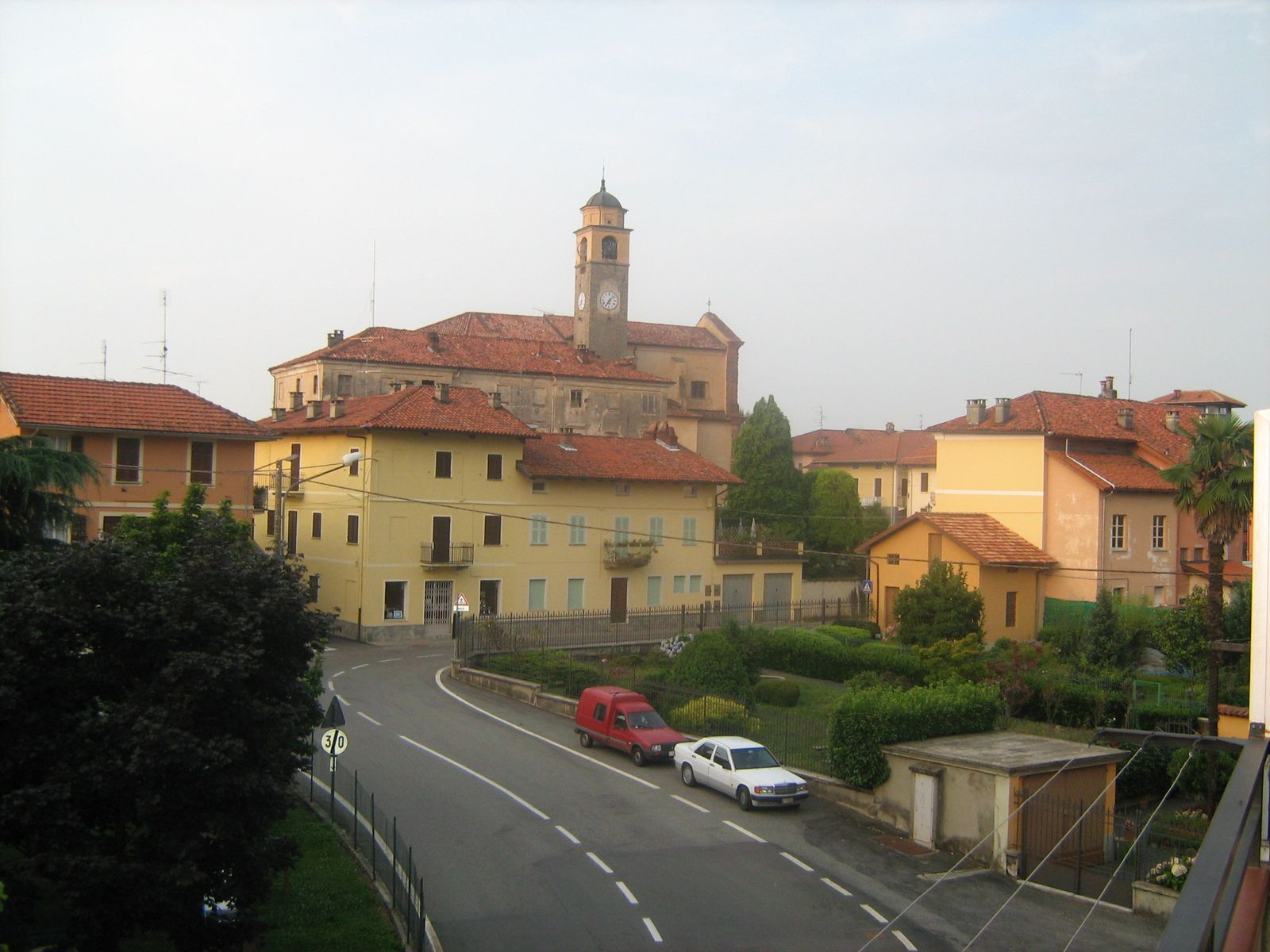
- View of Ronco Biellese

- Location within Italy Location within Piedmont
- Coordinates: 45°34′54″N 8°5′55″E
- Country: Italy
- Region: Piedmont
- Province: Province of Biella (BI)
- Frazioni: Centro, Veggio

Government
  - Mayor: Carla Moglia in Segala

Area
  - Total: 3.80 km^{2} (1.47 sq mi)

Population (Mar. 2021)
  - Total: 1,441
  - Density: 379/km^{2} (982/sq mi)
- Demonym: Ronchesi
- Time zone: UTC+1 (CET)
  - Summer (DST): UTC+2 (CEST)
- Postal code: 13845
- Dialing code: 015
- Patron saint: St. Michael
- Saint day: September 29
- Website: Official website

Ronco Biellese is a comune (municipality) in the Province of Biella in the Italian region Piedmont, located about 80 kilometres (50 mi) northeast of Turin and about 100 kilometres (62 mi) northwest of Milan.

Ronco Biellese borders the following municipalities: Biella, Pettinengo, Ternengo, Valdengo, Vigliano Biellese, Zumaglia. It was in the past an important centre of terracotta manufacture.

== Demographic evolution ==
Historical population

Year	Pop.	±%
1861	1,463	—
1871	1,590	+8.7%
1881	1,838	+15.6%
1901	1,715	−6.7%
1911	1,648	−3.9%

Year	Pop.	±%
1921	1,575	−4.4%
1931	1,504	−4.5%
1936	1,514	+0.7%
1951	1,701	+12.4%
1961	1,727	+1.5%

Year	Pop.	±%
1971	1,687	−2.3%
1981	1,614	−4.3%
1991	1,514	−6.2%
2001	1,540	+1.7%
2011	1,514	−1.7%

Source: Data from ISTAT

== See also ==
- Zumaglia Castle
