= Massazza =

- Comune
- Comune di Massazza
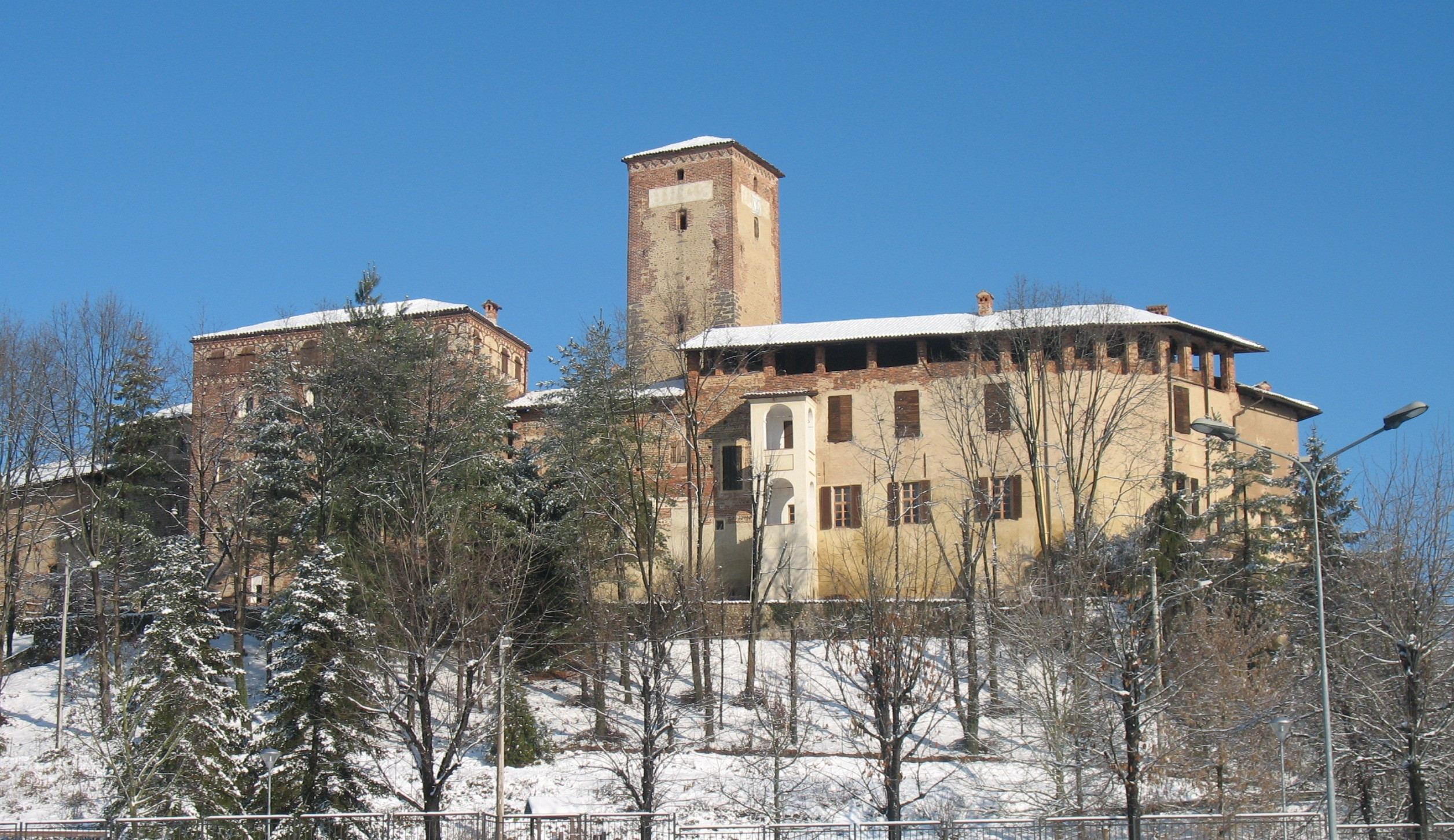
- Castle of Massazza.

- Coat of arms

- Location within Italy Location within Piedmont
- Coordinates: 45°33′N 8°7′E
- Country: Italy
- Region: Piedmont
- Province: Biella (BI)

Government
  - Mayor: Paolo Turati

Area
  - Total: 11.7 km^{2} (4.5 sq mi)

Population (30 September 2010)
  - Total: 558
  - Density: 47.7/km^{2} (124/sq mi)
- Demonym: Massazzesi
- Time zone: UTC+1 (CET)
  - Summer (DST): UTC+2 (CEST)
- Postal code: 13030
- Dialing code: 0161
- Website: Official website

Massazza is a small comune (municipality) in the Province of Biella in the Italian region Piedmont, located about 60 kilometres (37 mi) northeast of Turin, Italy and about 4 kilometres (2 mi) southeast of Biella, Italy.

Massazza borders the following municipalities: Benna, Cossato, Mottalciata, Salussola, Verrone, Villanova Biellese. It is home to a castle, built on a spur above the Biellese Baraggia natural area. The edifice was mentioned for the first time in 1239.
