= Lessona =

- Comune
- Comune di Lessona
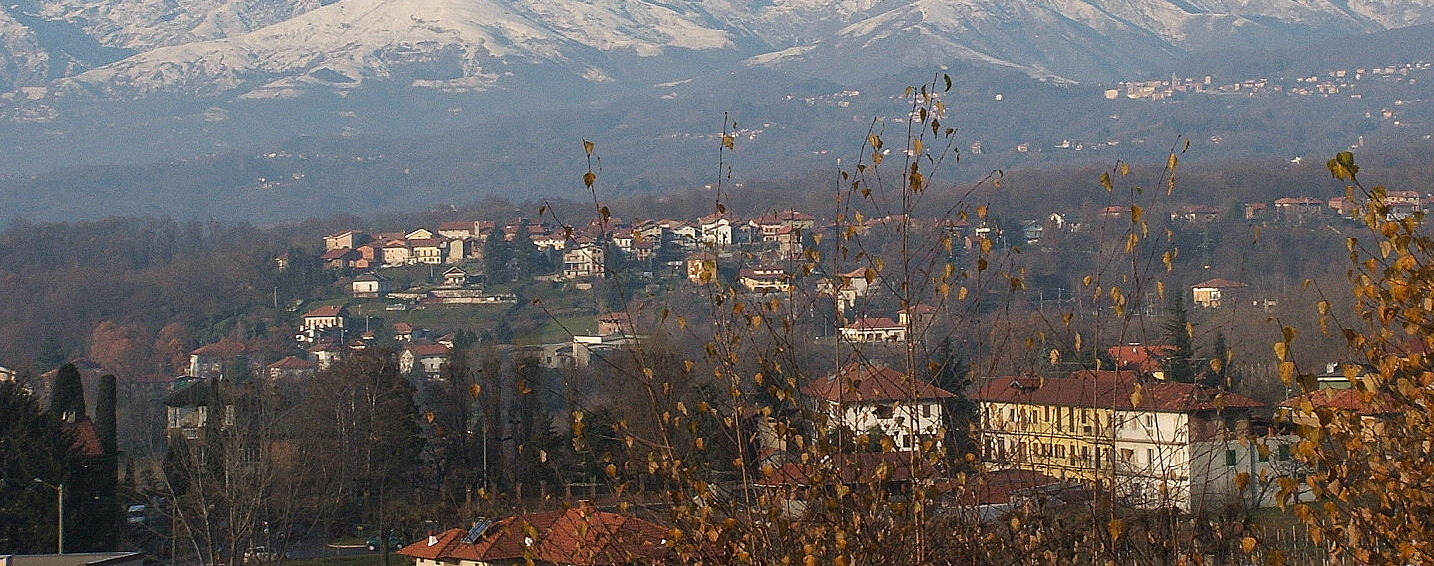
- View of Lessona

- Location within Italy Location within Piedmont
- Coordinates: 45°35′N 8°13′E
- Country: Italy
- Region: Piedmont
- Province: Province of Biella (BI)

Area
  - Total: 11.7 km^{2} (4.5 sq mi)

Population (Nov. 2025)
  - Total: 2,597
  - Density: 222/km^{2} (575/sq mi)
- Time zone: UTC+1 (CET)
  - Summer (DST): UTC+2 (CEST)
- Postal code: 13853
- Dialing code: 015
- ISTAT code: 096085

Lessona is a comune (municipality) in the Province of Biella in the Italian region Piedmont, located about 70 kilometres (43 mi) northeast of Turin and about 12 kilometres (7 mi) east of Biella. As of 30 November 2025, it had a population of 2,597 and an area of 11.7 square kilometres (4.5 mi^{2}).

Lessona borders the following municipalities: Casapinta, Castelletto Cervo, Cossato, Crosa, Masserano, Mottalciata.

Lessona it's produced the Lessona wine also a wine of great quality, vinified since the 12th century.

== Demographic evolution ==
Historical population

| Year | Pop. | ±% |
|---|---|---|
| 1861 | 1,283 | — |
| 1871 | 1,383 | +7.8% |
| 1881 | 1,533 | +10.8% |
| 1901 | 2,018 | +31.6% |
| 1911 | 2,046 | +1.4% |

| Year | Pop. | ±% |
|---|---|---|
| 1921 | 2,185 | +6.8% |
| 1931 | 2,305 | +5.5% |
| 1936 | 2,389 | +3.6% |
| 1951 | 2,532 | +6.0% |
| 1961 | 2,585 | +2.1% |

| Year | Pop. | ±% |
|---|---|---|
| 1971 | 2,425 | −6.2% |
| 1981 | 2,325 | −4.1% |
| 1991 | 2,301 | −1.0% |
| 2001 | 2,450 | +6.5% |

Source: Data from ISTAT
