= Candelo =

- Comune
- Comune di Candelo
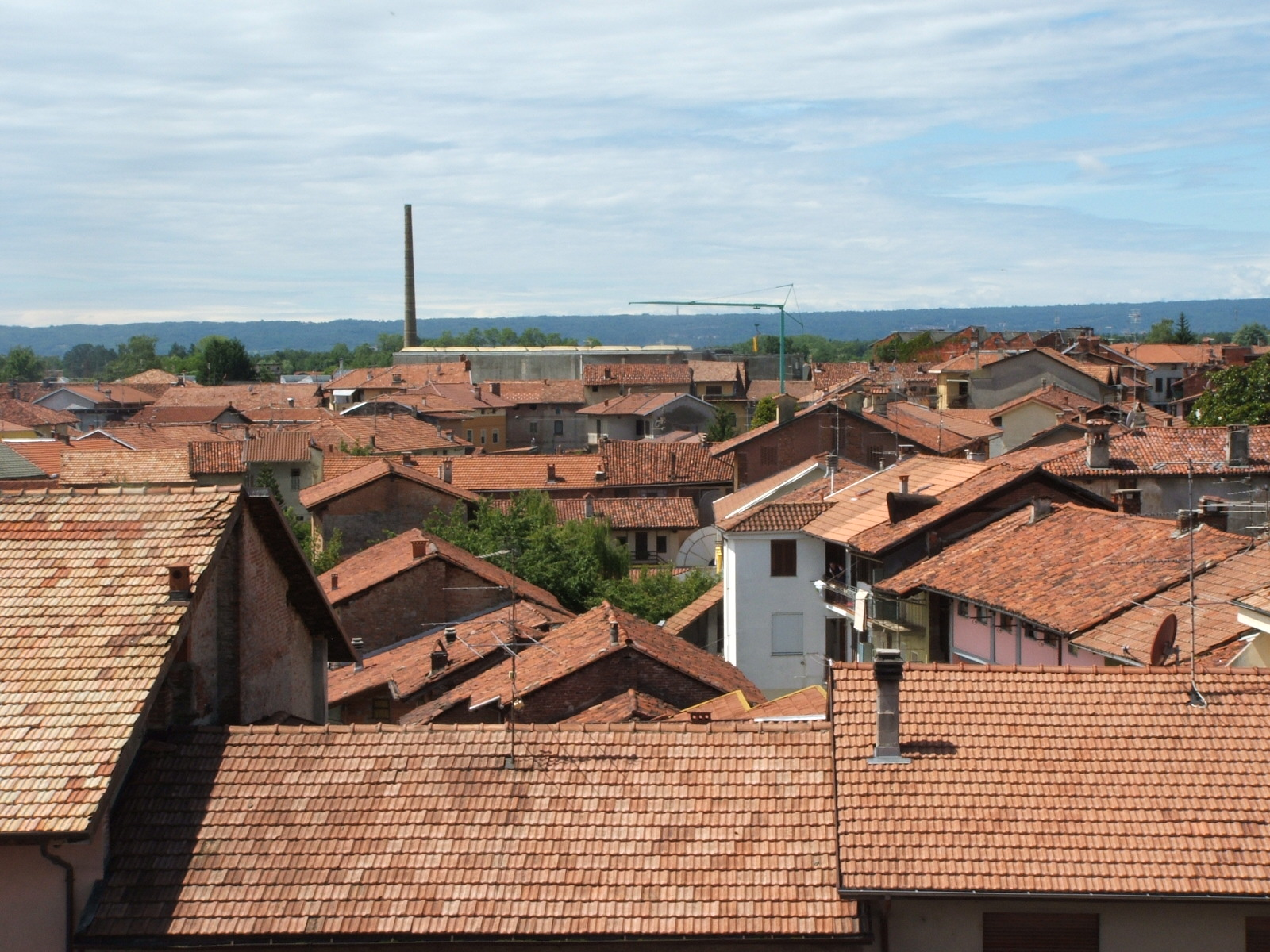
- View of Candelo

- Coat of arms

- Location within Italy Location within Piedmont
- Coordinates: 45°33′N 8°7′E
- Country: Italy
- Region: Piedmont
- Province: Biella (BI)

Government
  - Mayor: Giovanni Chilà

Area
  - Total: 15.1 km^{2} (5.8 sq mi)
- Elevation: 340 m (1,120 ft)

Population (30 September 2010)
  - Total: 8,060
  - Density: 534/km^{2} (1,380/sq mi)
- Demonym: Candelesi
- Time zone: UTC+1 (CET)
  - Summer (DST): UTC+2 (CEST)
- Postal code: 13878
- Dialing code: 015
- Website: Official website

Candelo is a comune (municipality) in the Province of Biella in the Italian region Piedmont, located about 60 kilometres (37 mi) northeast of Turin and about 4 kilometres (2 mi) southeast of Biella.

Candelo borders the following municipalities: Benna, Biella, Cossato, Gaglianico, Valdengo, Verrone, Vigliano Biellese. It is one of I Borghi più belli d'Italia ("The most beautiful villages of Italy").

== Main sights ==
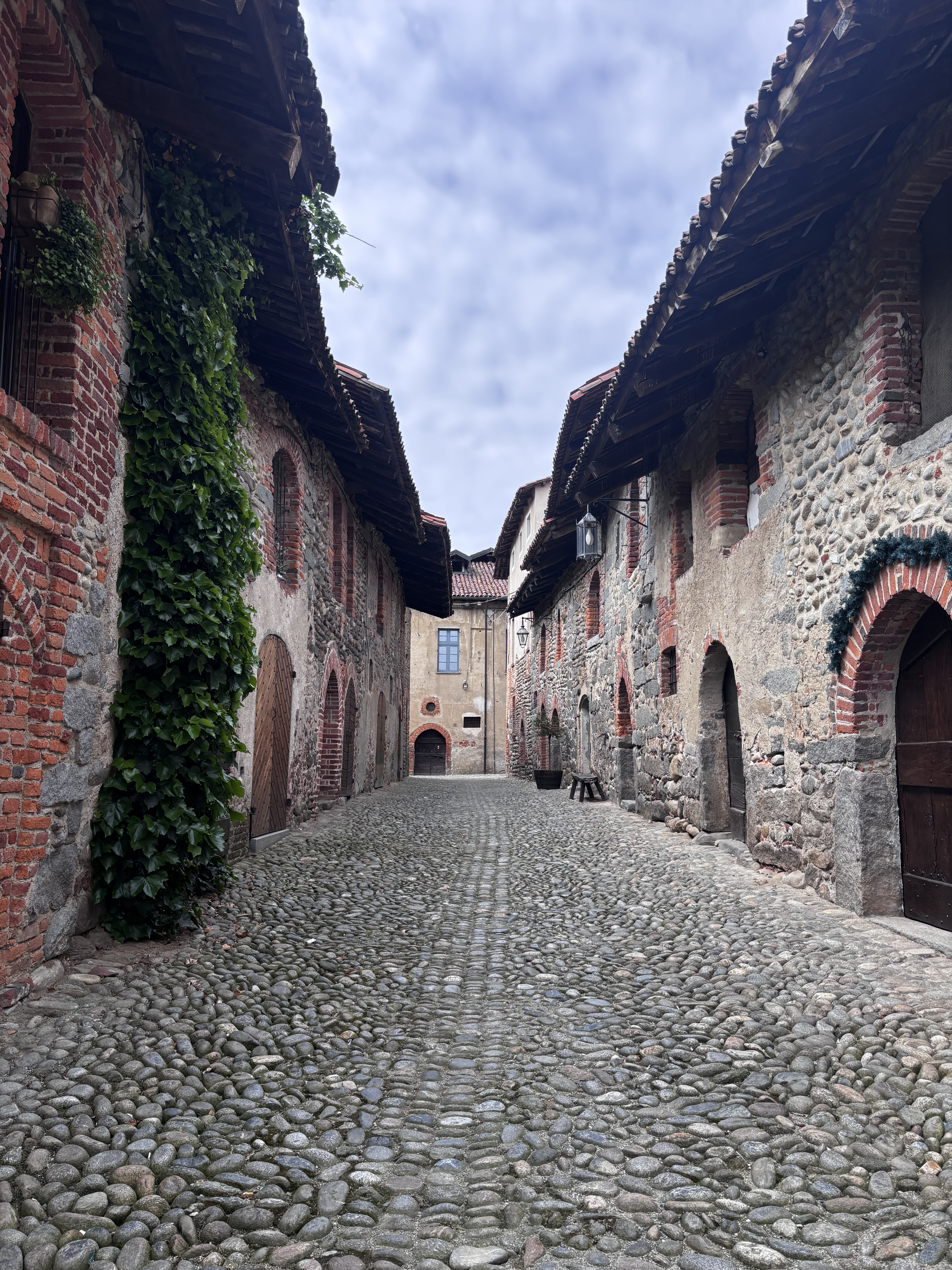
A street in Ricetto di Candelo

- The Ricetto di Candelo, a fortified storehouse
- Church of Santa Maria Maggiore (12th century)
- Church of St. Lawrence, of medieval origins but remade in Baroquestyle in the 18th century
- Ysangarda, a medieval archaeological site in the Baragge natural area.

== Notable figures ==
- Mario Pozzo
- Doctor Zot
- Mario Viana
