= Zumaglia =

- Comune
- Comune di Zumaglia
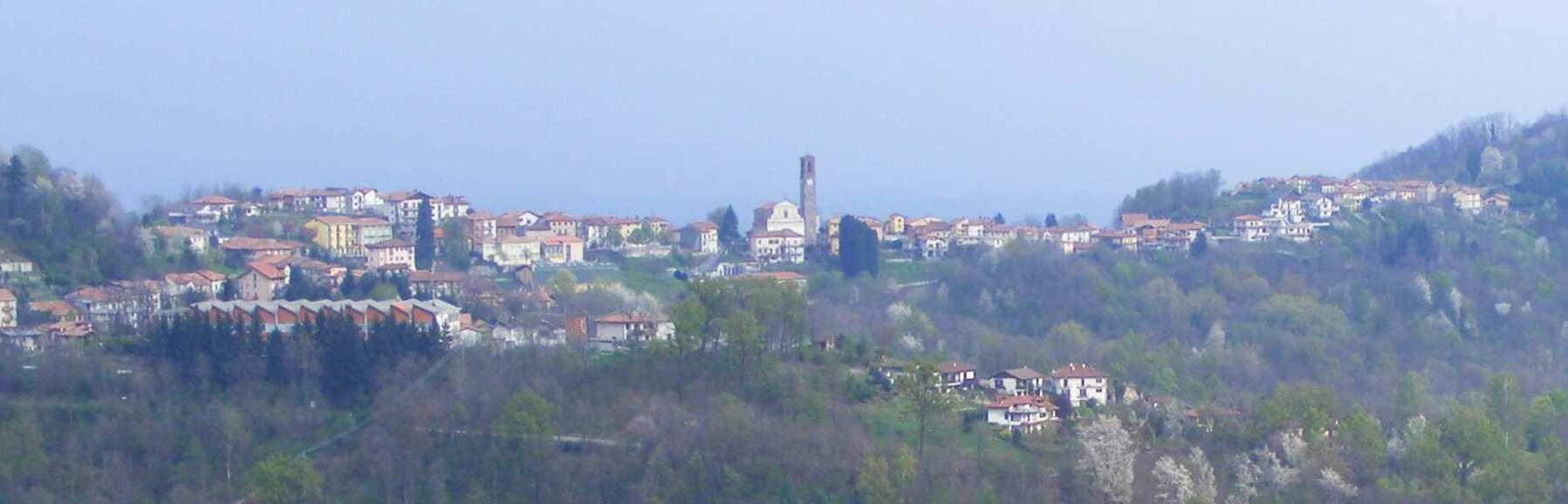
- View of Zumaglia

- Location within Italy Location within Piedmont
- Coordinates: 45°33′N 8°6′E
- Country: Italy
- Region: Piedmont
- Province: Province of Biella (BI)
- Frazioni: Bareto, Bona, Contornina, Cres, Uberti

Area
  - Total: 2.6 km^{2} (1.0 sq mi)

Population (Dec. 2004)
  - Total: 1,114
  - Density: 430/km^{2} (1,100/sq mi)
- Demonym: Zumagliesi
- Time zone: UTC+1 (CET)
  - Summer (DST): UTC+2 (CEST)
- Postal code: 13848
- Dialing code: 015

Zumaglia is a comune (municipality) in the Province of Biella in the Italian region Piedmont, located about 60 kilometres (37 mi) northeast of Turin and about 3 kilometres (2 mi) southeast of Biella. As of 31 December 2004, it had a population of 1,114 and an area of 2.6 square kilometres (1.0 mi^{2}).

Zumaglia borders the following municipalities: Biella, Pettinengo, Ronco Biellese.

== Demographic evolution ==
Historical population

| Year | Pop. | ±% |
|---|---|---|
| 1861 | 574 | — |
| 1871 | 695 | +21.1% |
| 1881 | 1,029 | +48.1% |
| 1901 | 849 | −17.5% |
| 1911 | 804 | −5.3% |
| 1921 | 884 | +10.0% |

| Year | Pop. | ±% |
|---|---|---|
| 1931 | 843 | −4.6% |
| 1936 | 787 | −6.6% |
| 1951 | 871 | +10.7% |
| 1961 | 944 | +8.4% |
| 1971 | 926 | −1.9% |
| 1981 | 942 | +1.7% |

| Year | Pop. | ±% |
|---|---|---|
| 1991 | 989 | +5.0% |
| 2001 | 1,073 | +8.5% |
| 2011 | 1,129 | +5.2% |
| 2021 | 983 | −12.9% |

Source: Data from ISTAT

== See also ==
- Zumaglia Castle
