= Province of Biella =

Coordinates: 45°34′39″N 8°3′4″E

Province of Biella Provincia di Biella (Italian) Provincia ëd Biela (Piedmontese)
- Province
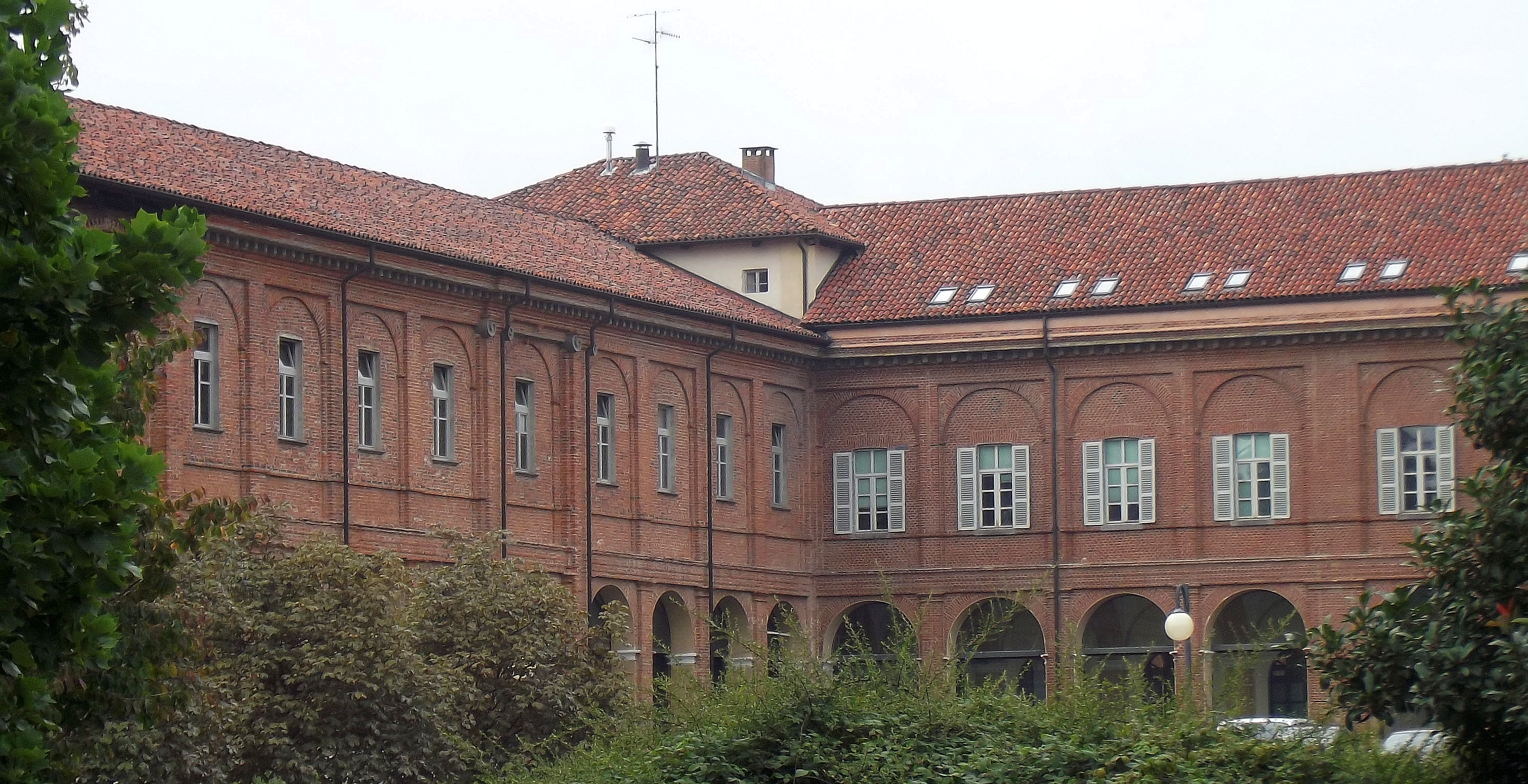
- The provincial seat

- Coat of arms

- Location of the province of Biella in Italy
- Country: Italy
- Region: Piedmont
- Capital(s): Biella
- Municipalities: 74

Government
  - President: Emanuele Ramella Pralungo

Area
  - Total: 913.28 km^{2} (352.62 sq mi)

Population (2026)
  - Total: 168,223
  - Density: 184.20/km^{2} (477.07/sq mi)

GDP
  - Total: €4.610 billion (2015)
  - Per capita: €25,556 (2015)
- Time zone: UTC+1 (CET)
  - Summer (DST): UTC+2 (CEST)
- Postal code: 13900
- Telephone prefix: 015
- Vehicle registration: BI
- ISTAT code: 096

The province of Biella (Italian: provincia di Biella; Piedmontese: provincia ëd Biela) is a province in the region of Piedmont in northern Italy. It was created in 1992 and its capital is the city of Biella. It has a population of 168,223 in an area of 913.28 square kilometres (352.62 mi^{2}) across its 74 municipalities.

== Municipalities ==
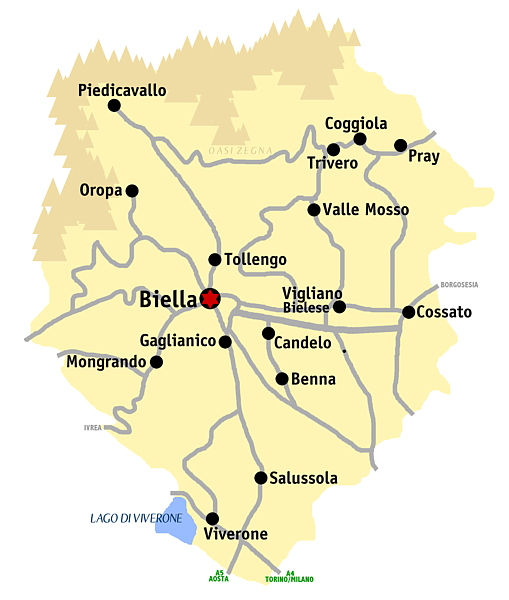
Map of the province of Biella

Map of municipalities of the province of Biella

The province has 74 municipalities:

- Ailoche
- Andorno Micca
- Benna
- Biella
- Bioglio
- Borriana
- Brusnengo
- Callabiana
- Camandona
- Camburzano
- Campiglia Cervo
- Candelo
- Caprile
- Casapinta
- Castelletto Cervo
- Cavaglià
- Cerrione
- Coggiola
- Cossato
- Crevacuore
- Curino
- Donato
- Dorzano
- Gaglianico
- Gifflenga
- Graglia
- Lessona
- Magnano
- Massazza
- Masserano
- Mezzana Mortigliengo
- Miagliano
- Mongrando
- Mottalciata
- Muzzano
- Netro
- Occhieppo Inferiore
- Occhieppo Superiore
- Pettinengo
- Piatto
- Piedicavallo
- Pollone
- Ponderano
- Portula
- Pralungo
- Pray
- Quaregna Cerreto
- Ronco Biellese
- Roppolo
- Rosazza
- Sagliano Micca
- Sala Biellese
- Salussola
- Sandigliano
- Sordevolo
- Sostegno
- Strona
- Tavigliano
- Ternengo
- Tollegno
- Torrazzo
- Valdengo
- Valdilana
- Vallanzengo
- Valle San Nicolao
- Veglio
- Verrone
- Vigliano Biellese
- Villa del Bosco
- Villanova Biellese
- Viverone
- Zimone
- Zubiena
- Zumaglia

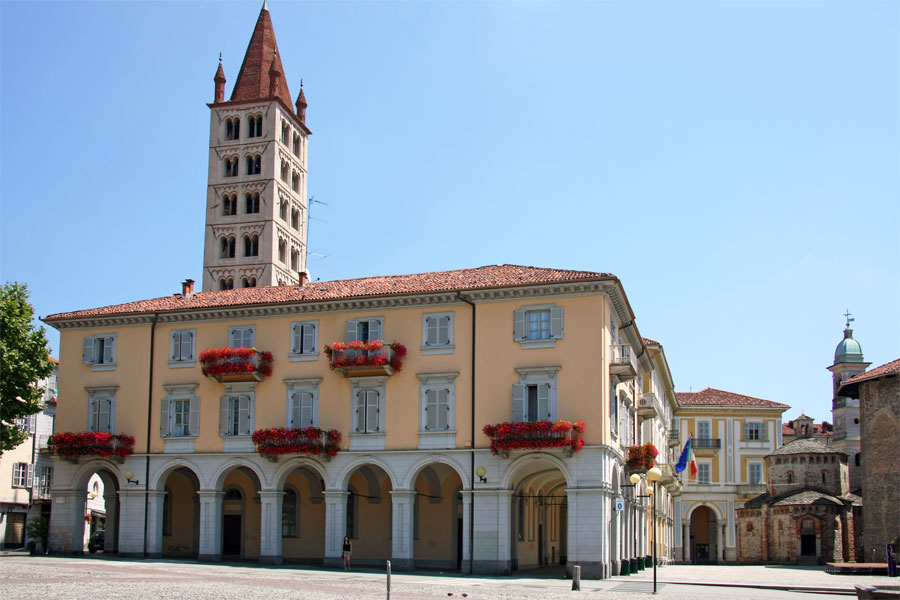
Biella

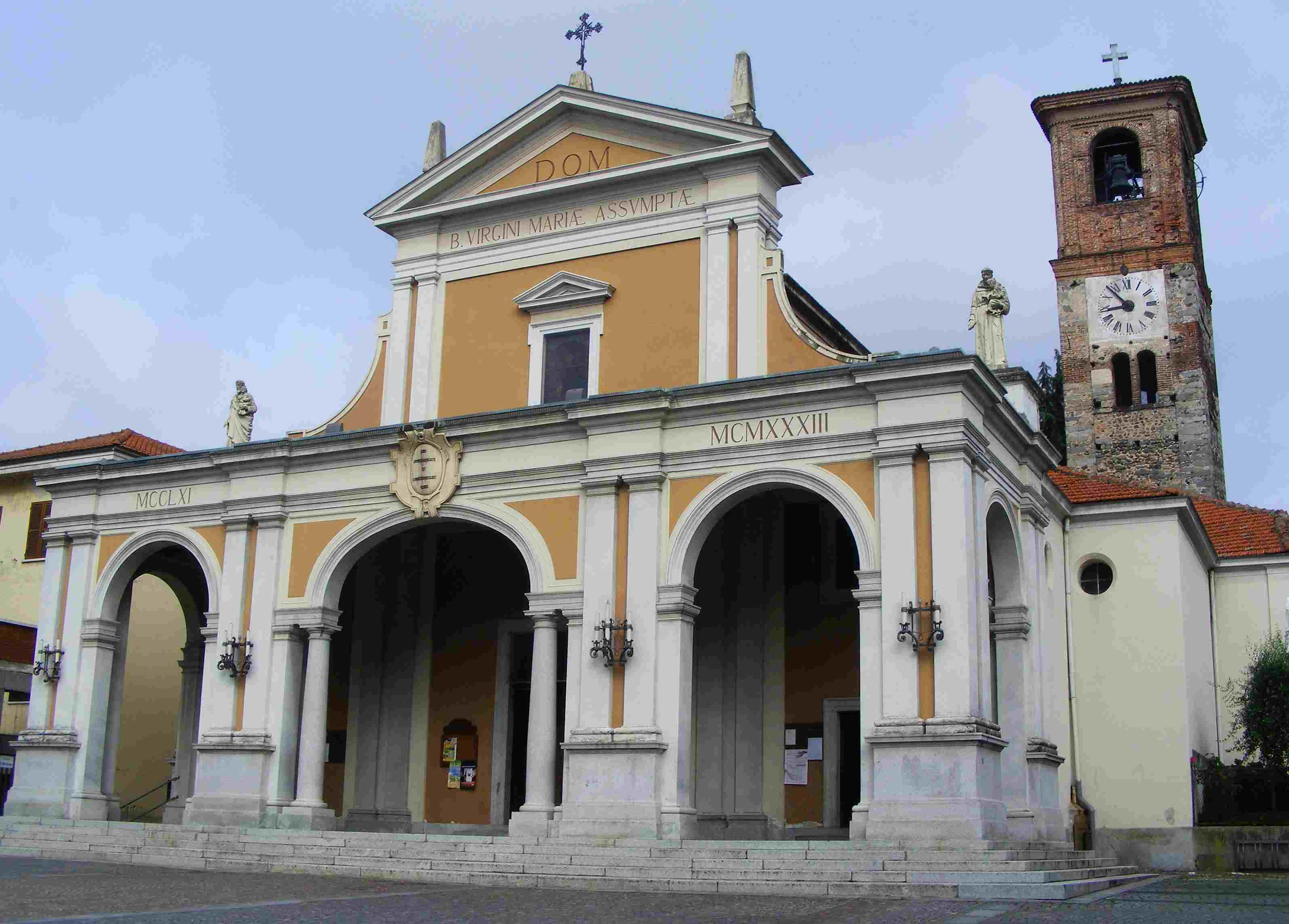
Cossato

== Demographics ==
As of 2026, the population is 168,223, of which 48.6% are male, and 51.4% are female. Minors make up 12% of the population, and seniors make up 30.6%.

Historical population

| Year | Pop. | ±% |
|---|---|---|
| 1861 | 130,806 | — |
| 1871 | 142,565 | +9.0% |
| 1881 | 157,095 | +10.2% |
| 1901 | 168,318 | +7.1% |
| 1911 | 166,226 | −1.2% |
| 1921 | 163,862 | −1.4% |
| 1931 | 168,756 | +3.0% |
| 1936 | 169,315 | +0.3% |

| Year | Pop. | ±% |
|---|---|---|
| 1951 | 184,724 | +9.1% |
| 1961 | 201,611 | +9.1% |
| 1971 | 205,422 | +1.9% |
| 1981 | 202,135 | −1.6% |
| 1991 | 191,291 | −5.4% |
| 2001 | 187,249 | −2.1% |
| 2011 | 182,192 | −2.7% |
| 2021 | 170,027 | −6.7% |

Source: ISTAT

=== Immigration ===
As of 2025, immigrants make up 10.8% of the population. The 5 largest foreign countries of birth are Morocco, Romania, Brazil, Ukraine, and Albania.

== Culture ==
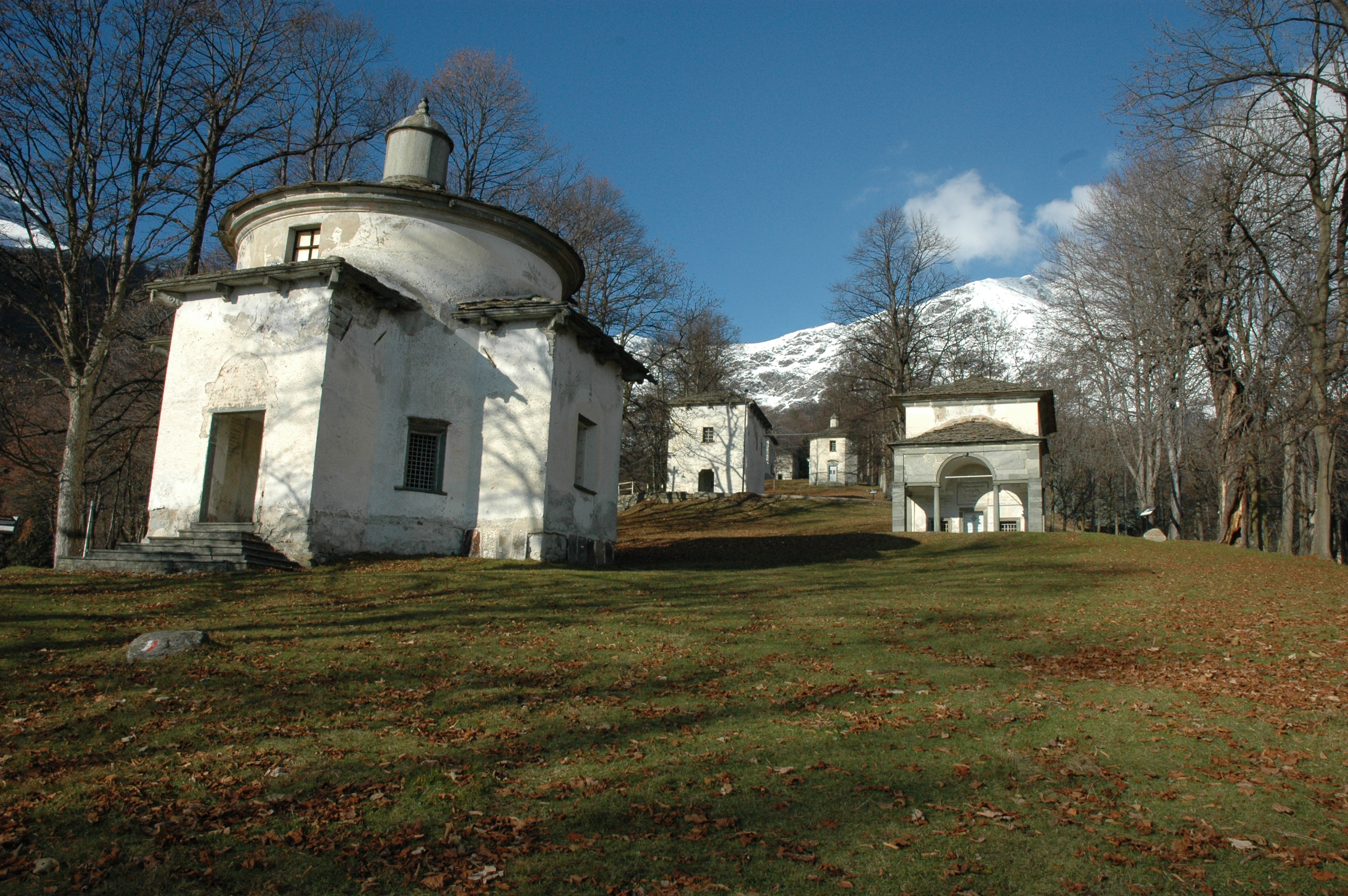
View of the Sacro Monte di Oropa

Biella is home to the Sacred Mountain of Oropa, which became a UNESCO World Heritage Site in 2003.

== Transport ==
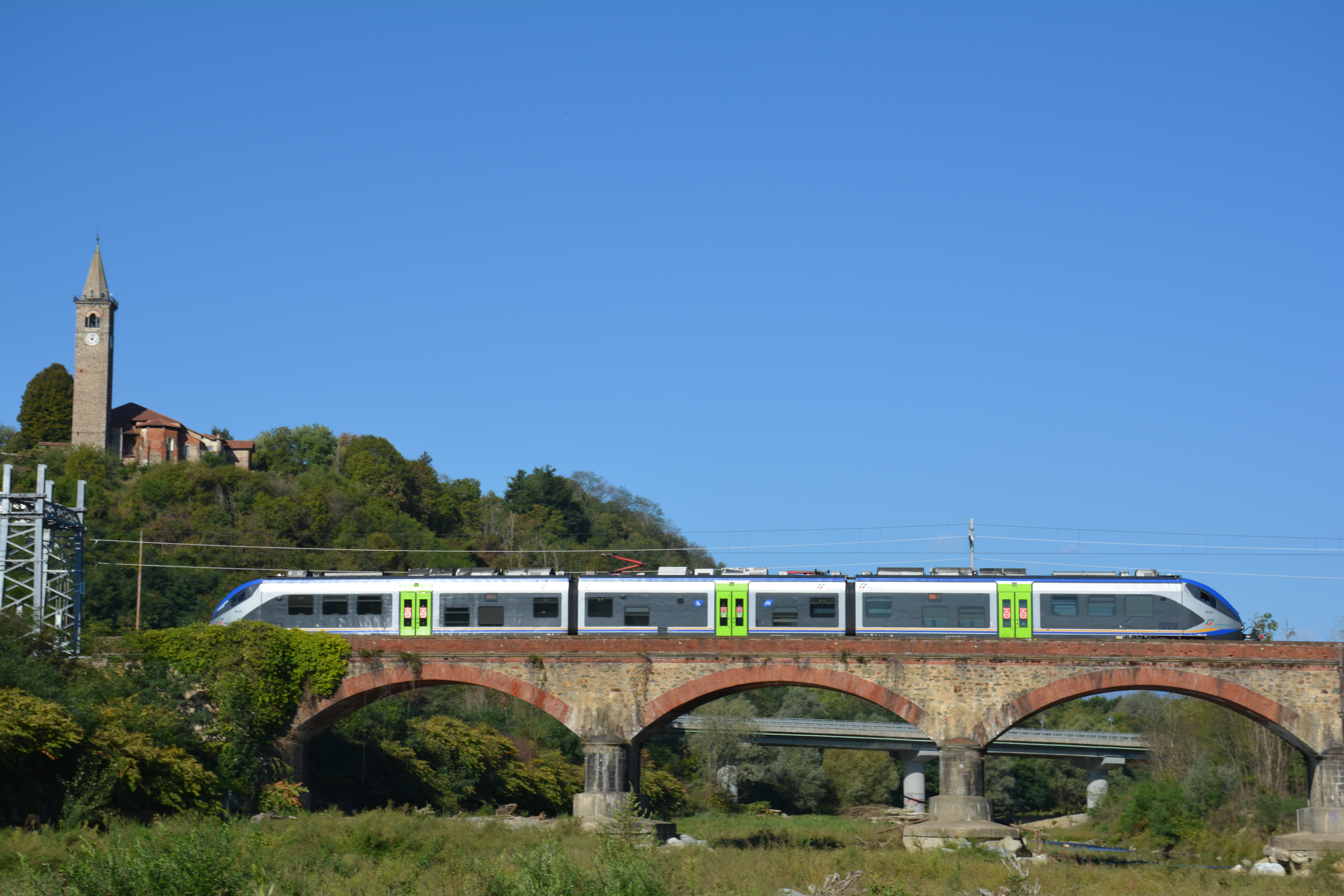
The Santhià–Biella railway bridge over the torrent Elvo. In transit an electric Minuet train

=== Airports ===
- Biella-Cerrione Airfield

=== Railways ===
- Biella–Novara railway
- Santhià–Biella railway

== See also ==
- Hydrography of the Biella region
