= Dorzano =

- Comune
- Comune di Dorzano
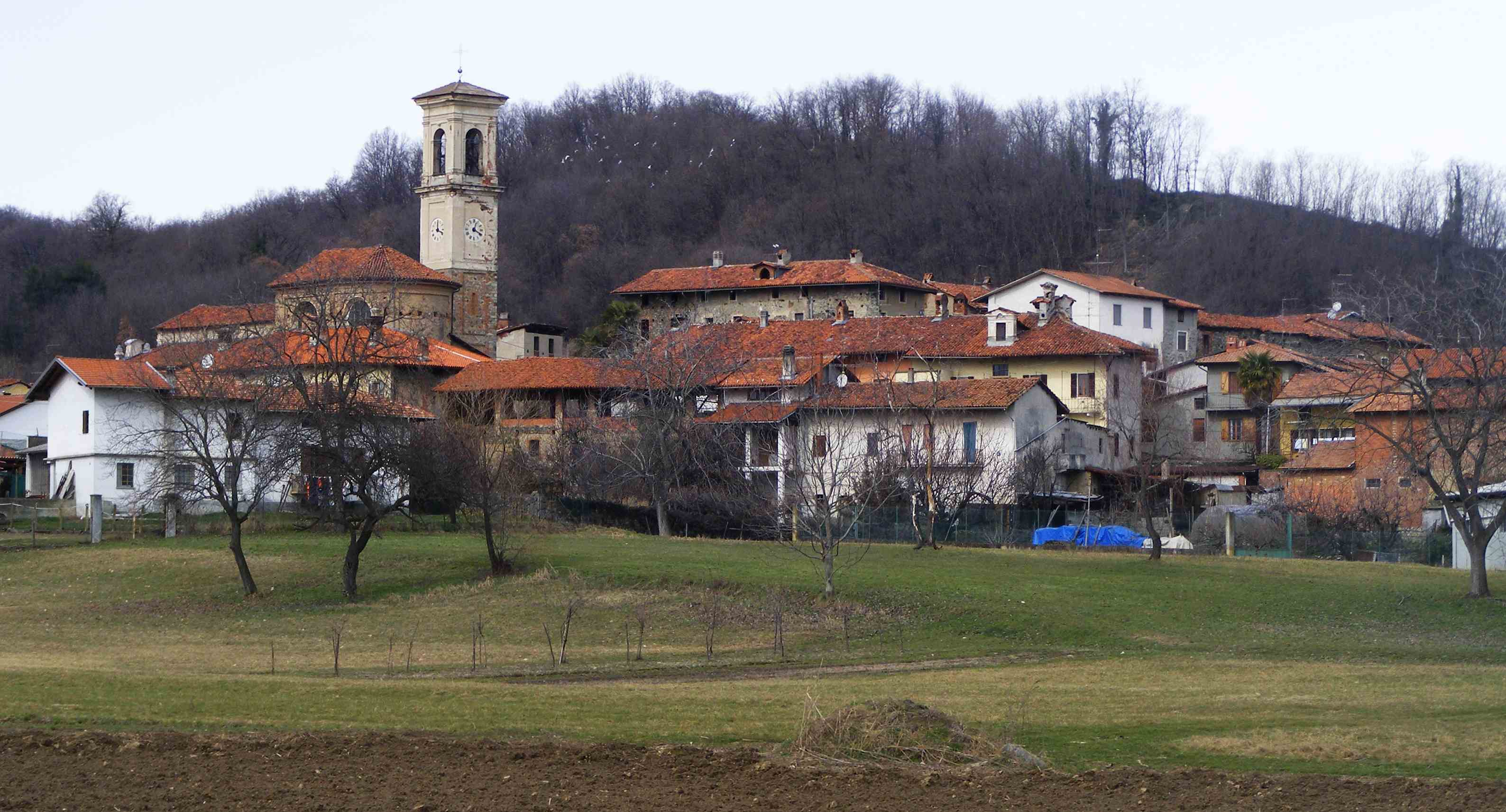
- View of Dorzano

- Location within Italy Location within Piedmont
- Coordinates: 45°24′N 8°5′E
- Country: Italy
- Region: Piedmont
- Province: Biella (BI)

Government
  - Mayor: Sergio Gusulfino

Area
  - Total: 4.8 km^{2} (1.9 sq mi)
- Elevation: 296 m (971 ft)

Population (31 July 2017)
  - Total: 523
  - Density: 110/km^{2} (280/sq mi)
- Demonym: Dorzanesi
- Time zone: UTC+1 (CET)
  - Summer (DST): UTC+2 (CEST)
- Postal code: 13881
- Dialing code: 0161
- Patron saint: St. Lawrence
- Saint day: 10 August
- Website: Official website

Dorzano is a comune (municipality) in the Province of Biella in the Italian region Piedmont, located about 50 kilometres (31 mi) northeast of Turin and about 20 kilometres (12 mi) south of Biella.
