= Buronzo =

- Comune
- Comune di Buronzo
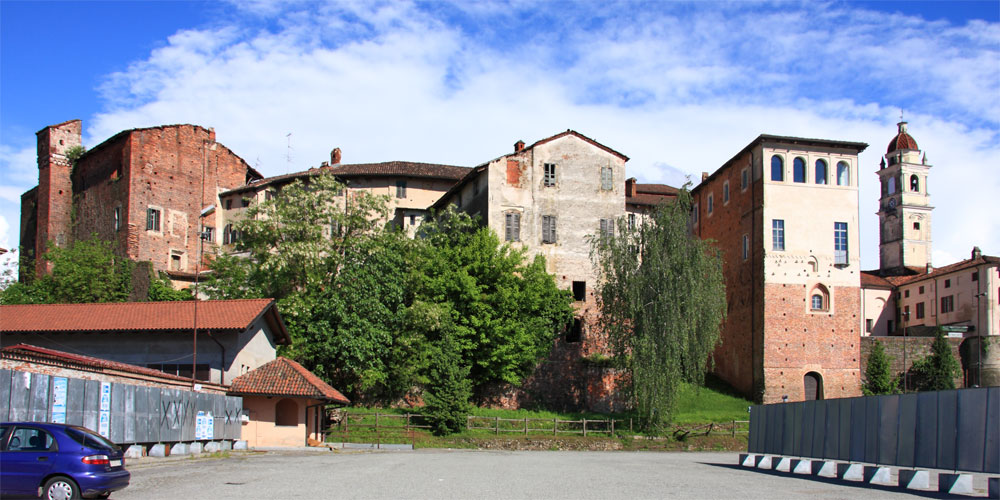

- Coat of arms

- Location within Italy Location within Piedmont
- Coordinates: 45°29′N 8°16′E
- Country: Italy
- Region: Piedmont
- Province: Vercelli (VC)

Government
  - Mayor: Silvana Tovo

Area
  - Total: 25.0 km^{2} (9.7 sq mi)
- Elevation: 189 m (620 ft)

Population (Dec. 2004)
  - Total: 967
  - Density: 38.7/km^{2} (100/sq mi)
- Time zone: UTC+1 (CET)
  - Summer (DST): UTC+2 (CEST)
- Postal code: 13040
- Dialing code: 0161

Buronzo is a comune (municipality) in the Province of Vercelli in the Italian region Piedmont, located about 60 kilometres (37 mi) northeast of Turin and about 20 kilometres (12 mi) northwest of Vercelli.
