= 1986 in Italian television =

This is a list of Italian television related events from 1986.

== Events ==
- 7 December: Auditel, a system for the automatic detection of audiences, managed equally by RAI, private channels and advertisers, comes into operation. It is today still active, despite the many controversies about its reliability.

=== Rai ===
- 18 January: Pippo Baudo, the most popular Italian TV personality, marries soprano Katia Ricciarelli; the wedding gets massive attention by the Italian mass-media.
- 15 February: Eros Ramazzotti wins the Sanremo Music festival, hosted by Loretta Goggi, with Adesso tu.
- 1 April: in the program Il fatto, Enzo Biagi opens live the Roberto Calvi's bag, disappeared in the banker's fatal trip to London and recovered, through mysterious intermediaries, by the MSI senator Giorgio Pisanò. Inside the bag, probably already lightened of the most compromising material, there are keys, identity documents and letters.
- 14 April: Enzo Biagi interviews Muammar Gaddafi eight hours before the United States bombing of Libya. Incredibly, RAI renounces to broadcast the extraordinary scoop, for "reasons of political expediency".
- 5 May: for the first time, RAI broadcasts a program (Hitchcock's film Rear Window) with subtitles for the deaf through Televideo.
- 17 June: the Italian football team is eliminated from the 1986 FIFA World Cup in Mexico in the round of 16. Despite the disappointing "Azzurri"'s performance and the several technical problems caused by Mexican television, the World Cup gets the highest ratings of the year, with peaks of twenty-five million viewers.
- 24 July: RAI 1 broadcasts the final show of the Rome Fashion Week in Eurvosion, with the title Donna sotto le stelle (Woman under the stars); the event was repeated every year, first on RAI, then on Canale 5, until 2003, when it was cancelled due to its excessive costs.
- 15 September: the Naples Court of Appeal, reversing the first sentence, acquits Enzo Tortora of charges of Camorra association and drug trafficking.
- 2 October: RAI board of directors is renewed after a two-year stalemate due to the contrasts between DC and PSI; the socialist Enrico Manca becomes president.
- 16 November : Beppe Grillo, guest on Fantastico, closes an ironic monologue about an expensive official travel to China by PM Bettino Craxi by saying: "If in China everybody is socialist, who are they stealing from?". The host Pippo Baudo, answering a live phone call from Adriano Celentano, immediately dissociates himself from the joke. Following the violent protests of the PSI, Grillo was removed from RAI for a few years.
- 23 November: always on Fantastico, a parody of Irangate is staged, with Tullio Solenghi and Massimo Lopez playing Khomeini and Reagan. The sketch, quite harmless, causes a diplomatic incident. Iran's government closes Istituto Italiano di cultura in Tehran and withdraws its ambassador from Rome.
- 12 December: RAI extends the broadcasting to the morning hours.

=== Fininvest ===
- 20 febbraio: in France the Fininvest channel La cinq begins broadcasting.
- 22 January: the Turin Magistrate blacks out Fininvest and Rete A in Piedmont. On the 31st, the Court of Freedom invalids the measure and establishes that private TV stations could broadcast on a national scale, till the enactment of a law regulating the sector.

=== Other private channels ===
- 10 February: debut of TMC news, the Telemontecarlo news program, directed by the Brazilian Riccardo Pereira (former London correspondent of Rede Globo). It tries to import into Italy the formula of American all-news channels, with predominance of images and of foreign policy, but gets imitated success.
- 14 July: on Rete A, the telemarketers Wanna Marchi and Guido Angeli remember the furniture maker Giorgio Aiazzone, one of the largest advertisers of the network, who died the week before in a plane crash. The two commemorations (especially the Angeli's one, eighty minutes long) become infamous as an example of bad taste.
- 31 August: end of the TV Port syndicate.

== Awards ==
3. Telegatto Award, for the season 1985–1986.

- Man of the year: Pippo Baudo
- Best miniseries: La piovra 2 (for Italy), and V (for abroad).
- Best serial: Dallas (for abroad).
- Best quiz: Pentatlon..
- Best variety: Drive in.
- Best talk show: Pronto, chi gioca?
- Best educational: Quark.
- Best music show: Sanremo music festival.
- Best sport magazine: La domenica sportiva.
- Best features: Spot
- Best show for children: Bim bum bam.
- Best spot: Pasta Barilla
- Awards for foreign televisions: Joan Collins (USA), Stephane Collaro (France), BBC news (UK), Fernando Rey (Spain), Horst Tappert (Germany).
- Special award: Marina Vassallo (Sorrisi e canzoni reader).

== Debuts ==
=== Rai ===
==== Variety ====
- Un altro varietà - by Antonello Falqui, with Daniele Formica and other nine young actors (Sergio Rubini among them); 2 seasons.
- Chi tiriamo in ballo? (Who are we bringing into this?) – show of amateurish performances, hosted by Gigi Sabani; 2 seasons.
- Jeans – musical show, dedicated to the Italian independent music, hosted by Fabio Fazio; 2 seasons.
- Pista! – show for children, hosted by Muarizio Nichetti, containing inside Disney films and cartoons; 2 seasons.

==== News and educational ====
- Unomattina – infotainment morning show, hosted by Piero Badaloni and Elisabetta Gardini, then by many others; again on air. It's the first program broadcast by RAI in the AM hours.
- La clessidra (The hourglass) – philosophy talk-show, hosted by Gianni Vattimo, with the most famous Italian philosophers as guests; two seasons.
- Tre minuti di... (Three minutes of...) – daily magazine, broadcast after TG1, care of Emilio Rossi; lasted till 1992.

=== Fininvest ===
==== Variety ====
- La corrida, dilettanti allo sbaraglio (The corrida, amateurs at risk) - talent-show, hosted by Corrado Mantoni, who transposes on video his radio success of the Seventies, and then by others; again on air (by now, on Nove). Unlike most of the talent-shows, here the competitors are true amateurs, often good-willing but comically inept, and politely mocked by the presenter.
- Cabaret per una notte – television version of the Loano Cabaret festival; 3 seasons. The show reveals to the general public the duo Aldo and Giovanni (not again teamed up with Giacomo), winners of the first edition.

==== News and educational ====
- Parlamento in, political magazine, hosted by Rita dalla Chiesa, then by Cesara Buonamici; lasted till 2003.
- Ciak – cinema magazine, lasted till 1997.

=== Other private channels ===
- Clip clip – parade of videoclips and concerts; lasted till 1990 (Telemontecarlo).

=== International ===
- (United States) The Cosby show (Canale 5)
- (United States) Miami Vice (Rai 2)
- (United States) Loving (RAI 2)

== Television shows ==
=== RAI ===
==== Miniseries ====
- Attentato al papa (Shooting the pope) – by Giuseppe Fina, in two episodes; reconstruction of the attempted assassination of Pope John Paul II, following the theory (not confirmed by the enquiries) of the Bulgarian connection. Christopher Bucholz gives an amazing performance as Mehmet Ali Ağca, thanks in part to his physical resemblance to the failed assassin.
- Ateleier – by Vito Molinari, with Elsa Martinelli, Paola Pitagona and Lino Capolicchio; 5 episodes. Dramedy set in a fashion magazine.
- Una donna a Venezia (A woman in Venice) by Sandro Bolchi, with Lea Massari and Fernando Rey; 4 episodes.The decadence of an aristocratic Venetian family.
- Lulù by Sandro Bolchi, from the Carlo Bertolazzi's play, trasposed in the Milan of the Sixties, with Mariangela Melato; 4 episodes.
- Se un giorno busserai alla mia porta (If a day you'll knock to my door) – by Luigi Perelli, with Virna Lisa and Mathilda May; 3 episodes. A famous actress must face the drug addiction of the daughter.
- Strada senza uscita (No exit strett) – mystery by Anton Giulio Majano, from the Martin Russell’s tale, with Giueseppe Pambieri and Lorenza Guerrieri; 4 episodes.
- Spy connection – very inticated spy story by Giorgio Bontempi, with Tony Musante, Claudio Cassinelli and Omero Antonutti; 7 episodes.

===== Historical dramas =====
- La neve nel bicchiere (The snow in the glass), by Florestano Vancini, from the Nerino Rossi's novel, with the debuting Massimo Ghini; 4 episodes. Reconstruction of trade union struggles in the lower Po Valley between the Nineteenth and Twentieth centuries.
- Un’isola – by Carlo Lizzani, from the Giorgio Amendola's memory, with Massimo Ghini as Amendola and Christiane Jean.
- La storia (History) – by Luigi Comencini, from the Elsa Morante’s novel, with Claudia Cardinale; 3 episodes.
- Mino by Gianfranco Albano, from Salvator Gotta's Little Alpino, with Guido Cella, Mario Adorf and Ottavia Piccolo; 4 episodes. Italian-German coproduction.

===== Mafia stories =====
- La piovra 2 – by Florestano Vancini, with Michele Placido, Sergio Fantoni, Martin Balsam and Francois Perier; 6 episodes. Follow-up of La piovra; the focus moves from the Mafia in the strict sense to its accomplices in deviated Freemasonry and State apparatus.
- Blood ties by Giacomo Battiato, with Brad Davis, Tony Lo Bianco and Barbara De Rossi; 3 episodes.
- Naso di cane (Dog nose) – by Pasquale Squitieri, with Nigel Bruce, Luca De Filippo and Claudia Cardinale, from the Attilio Veraldi’s novel; in 3 episodes. Firsti TV fiction about the camorra; in Naples, a killer and a police chief are adversaries and at the same time friends, till both die in a shooting.

==== Serials ====
- Quando arriva il giudice (When the judge carrives) – by Giulio Questi, with Jean-Luc Bideau as a former judge turned into a shabby private eye.

==== Variety ====
- Il bello della diretta (The beauty of the live broadcast) - with Loretta Goggi.
- Hamburger serenade – parodic variety (the presumed guest stars are actually amateurs) directed by Pupi Avati and hosted by Nik Novecento.
- Crazy boat – revue set on a cruise ship, with Carlo Dapporto and Ivana Monti.
- Un fantastico tragico venerdì (A tragic, fantastic Frydady) – with Paolo Villaggio and Carmen Russo.
- Non necessariamente - with Carlo Massarini; the show is remembered for the experimental use of computer graphics.
- Io, a modo mio (Me, on my way) – one man show of Gigi Proietti.

==== News and educational ====
- Il coraggio e la pietà (Courage and pity) – enquiry by Nicola Caracciolo about the racial laws and the Holocaust in Italy; 3 episodes.
- Storia di un altro italiano (History of another Italian) – documentary about Walter Chiari by Tatti Sanguineti; 7 episodes.
- Spot - weekly magazine, care of Enzo Biagi.
- Il cammino delle idee (The ideas’ path) – cultural magazine with interviews to intellectuals of international fame, from Karl Popper to Marguerite Yourcenar.
- Quark economia – spin-off of Quark, dedicated to economy and always hosted by Piero Angela.

=== Fininvest ===
==== Comedy ====
- Kamikaze, parodic spy-story by Bruno Crobucci, with Gianfranco Manfredi and Philippe Leroy.
- Le volpi della notte (Night foxes) – by Bruno Corbucci, sort of Chalie's angels’ Italian version, with Viola Valentino and Pamela Prati.
- Ferragosto OK – beach comedy by Sergio Martino, with Mauro De Francesco and Sabrina Salerno.

==== Serials ====
- Love me Licia, with Cristina D’Avena and Pasquale Finicelli; live adaptation of the manga Ai Shite Knight. Infamous as an example of TV kitsch, it gets however a good success among the younger viewiers.

==== News and educational ====
- Studio 5 – infotainment magazine, hosted by Marco Columbro and Roberta Termali, aired at 8 PM in concurrence with TG1.

=== Other private channels ===
- Rosso di sera – sexy variety, hosted by Paolo Mosca (on the Rovigo television Telereporter).

== Ending this year ==
- Il cappello sulle 23
- Di tasca nostra
- Grand Hotel
- Help!
- L’orecchiocchio
- Sotto le stelle
- Storia di un italiano
- W le donne
- Zig zag

== Deaths ==
- 10 February: Paolo Cavallina (70), journalist.
- 11 February: Roberta Giusti (42), announcer.
- 19 February: Adolfo Celi (63), actor.
- 23 February: Nino Taranto (78), comic actor.
