= Giorgio Aiazzone =

Giorgio Aiazzone (Tollegno, 3 April 1947 – Sartirana Lomellina, 6 July 1986) was an Italian entrepreneur and television personality, founder of the company of the same name.

A successful entrepreneur in Italy in the furniture sector, he achieved widespread popularity in the 1980s thanks to the emerging local television stations born at that time, on which he promoted his company by personally appearing on video and using simple and effective slogans, which remained in the collective imagination of Italians even following his death. He was considered one of the pioneers of teleshopping and the use of television for advertising purposes.

The entrepreneur's body is buried in the monumental cemetery of the Sanctuary of Oropa in a chapel designed by the architect Giulio Carpano. A legal dispute dragged on for years over the division of the deceased entrepreneur's inheritance, which involved his daughter Marcella.

== Biography ==
=== Origins and education ===
Giorgio Aiazzone was born in Tollegno Bivio on 3 April 1947. His father, Mario Giuseppe, was a craftsman active in the production of wooden furniture. After obtaining the geometrics diploma, Giorgio begins to deal with the promotion of the products of the family business at the sales points in the province of Biella. From his marriage to Rosella Piana (1951-2002; also of Biellan origins and daughter of a local industrialist) she had three children.

=== Business activity and involvement with Telebiella ===
In the 1970s, Aiazzone continued to work in the field of furniture production and saw his company grow rapidly and stand out from its competitors due to its massive use of television advertising. From a local dimension, focused in particular on the collaboration with Telebiella, the television promotion of the company's products extends first to other local stations in northern Italy and then to the whole country. The success of the operation was based on the efficiency of the slogans,( (Note: Aiazzone, è la scelta più Biella del mondo, Vieni, vieni, vieni da Aiazzone) on a careful choice of testimonials (often personally supervised by Aiazzone himself) and on innovative purchasing formulas such as the gift without obligation to purchase (for example, a wristwatch was given as a gift without the obligation to purchase the furniture offered), or hospitality at dinner with the company's architects ("you will be welcome guests of the architects in Biella").

Starting from 1983, the collaboration with Guido Angeli was consolidated who, in addition to recording numerous commercials and conducting daily television auctions and telesales for the furniture factory, also took care of the look of Giorgio Aiazzone. The furniture factory's business expands and Aiazzone enters into various agreements with some local television stations. In the meantime, large sales outlets (Città del Mobile) are opened in many Italian locations and the turnover grows to reach 60 billion liras.

=== Air accident and death ===
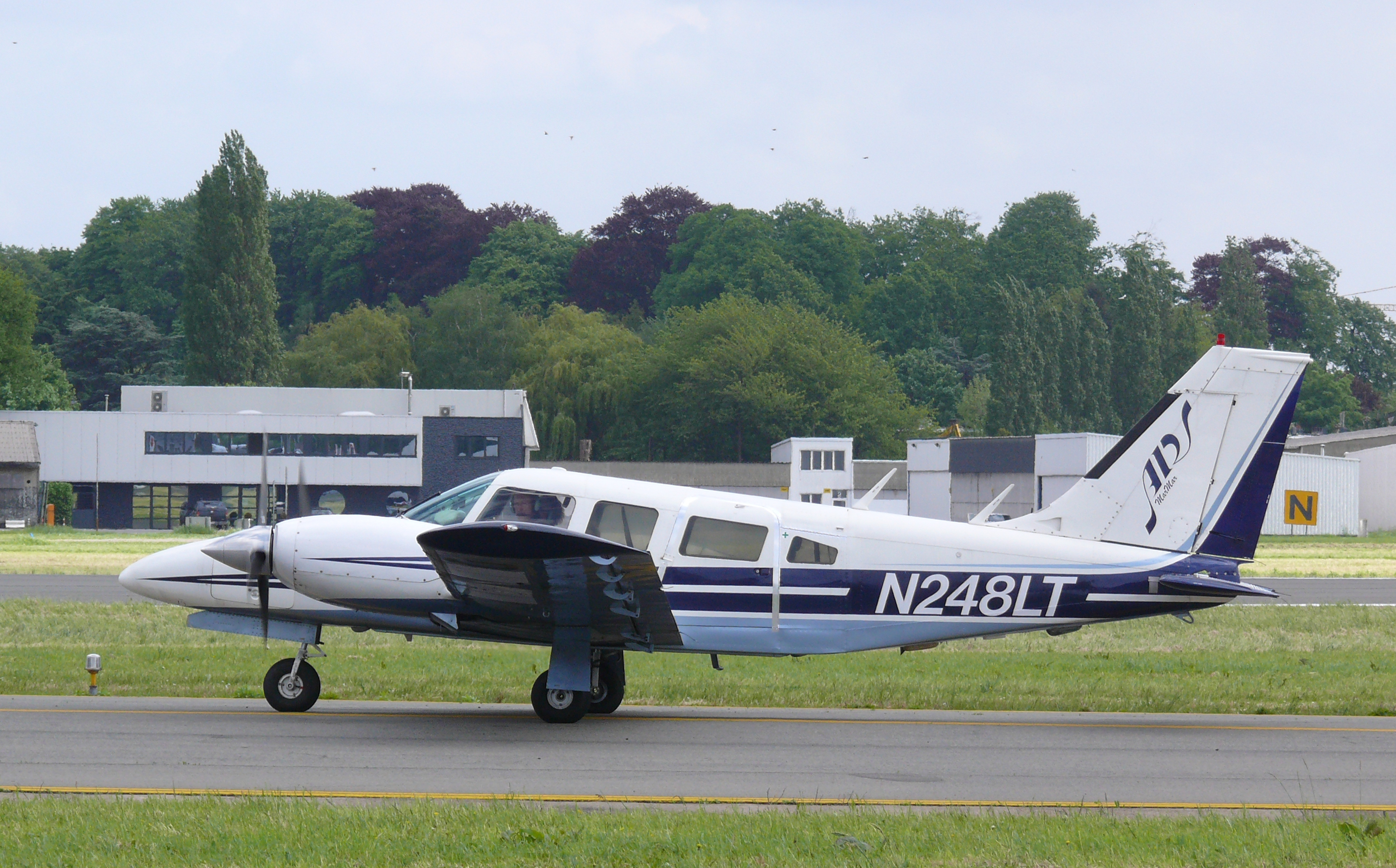
A Piper PA-34-200T Seneca II aircraft, similar to the model involved in the Aiazzone accident

Among the entrepreneur's passions was that of flying, which often translated into quick trips in the company of friends and family on light planes rented for the occasion. On 6 July 1986, upon returning to Biella from Massa airport, the Piper PA-34 Seneca II with I-APAM registration, rented by the Piedmontese entrepreneur, which took off despite forecasts of severe bad weather, attempted a detour onto Lomellina, but lost radio contact while strong storms raged in the area. The prohibitive weather conditions cause the aircraft to lose control, which falls and spins near Sartirana Lomellina, suffering severe structural damage during the fall. Aiazzone and the other passenger, Clelia Allegretti, a magistrate and family friend, were thrown out of the fuselage and their remains were found far from the wreck; the lifeless body of the pilot, Giacomo Ramella Cravaro, will be found still fastened to his seat belts, in what remains of the plane that caught fire after the impact on high voltage cables.

== Commemorations ==
- In the same year of his death, Rete A dedicated a couple of programs to the entrepreneur: one hosted by Wanna Marchi in the company of his daughter Stefania Nobile and the other by Guido Angeli, broadcast on 14 and 15 July respectively. The broadcasts were judged excessive and vaguely macabre but they had a great impact on the public and this became a case study among mass media experts. Marchi, however, lashed out at the station's editor Alberto Peruzzo for having imposed that program on her, stating that she would have preferred to "veil the television in mourning for a whole day".
- Journalists Giancarlo Dotto and Sandro Piccinini in their book Il mucchio selvaggio published 2006 talked about the Rete A broadcasts.

== See also ==
- Aiazzone
- Biella
- Guido Angeli
- Telebiella

== Bibliografia ==
- Luigi Simari (2026). La Geometria delle Coincidenze: un uomo geniale, la sua famiglia, un sogno diventato incubo, giustizia negata e verità nascoste. [Edizioni Contrasto]. ISBN 979-1224707257.
