= Aiazzone =

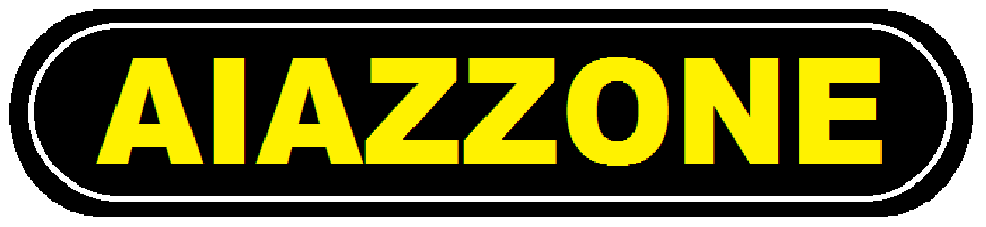
- Type: Retail
- Industry: Retail
- Founded: Biella, Italy (1981; 45 years ago)
- Defunct: 2010
- Headquarters: Biella, Italy
- Area served: Italy

Aiazzone was the commercial name of a corporate group operating first in the industrial production of furniture sector, and then in marketing, whose main nucleus was founded in Biella by the entrepreneur Mario Aiazzone and subsequently directed by his son Giorgio.

The group was characterized in the eighties by the intensive use of television advertising, and with a brief experience also in the field of local television broadcasting, growing until the death of Giorgio Aiazzone, which occurred in a plane crash on 6 July 1986. The notoriety became national in 1984, when the television presenter and telemarketer Guido Angeli became its main testimonial using the motto Provare per credere! ("Seeing is believing!"). Its teleshopping was then continued by another television huckster, Walter Carbone.

== History ==
=== Creation ===
The furniture factory originated from an artisan business founded in Tollegno in the 1950s by Mario Giuseppe Aiazzone. In the 1960s the sale of furniture was commercialized in Biella, in the early seventies, thanks to the commitment of his children Giorgio and Enrica, he opened the main office in the Piedmontese town, in Corso San Maurizio.

In 1981 Giorgio Aiazzone founds Mobilificio Piemonte S.r.l. which quickly takes on the commercial name Aiazzone, as a brand in its own right. The headquarters is moved to a newly built building, purposely erected in an expanding area, in Corso Europa 15.

=== 1980s and consolidation ===
During Giorgio's management, advertising funding increased to over three billion lire a year, with a turnover of approximately 30 billion lire and 190 employees at the single headquarters in Biella.

Thanks to heavy advertising investments, between the end of the seventies and the early eighties Aiazzone was one of the numerous Italian entrepreneurs to try to create a national television network by purchasing control or ownership of small local stations which he already influenced as the main sponsor. Collaboration and advertising agreements were also stipulated with some local television stations, leading to the creation of one of the first Italian television networks, Gruppo Aiazzone Televisivo (G.A.T.), a sort of network, based in Liscate. It consisted of Telebiella, TeleMontepenice, Tele Radio Milano 2, Telejolly, Videobrianza and Erreuno TV, covering Biella, Lombardy, part of Veneto and Emilia. Its commercials were broadcast nationwide, on Canale 5, Telecity, Antennatre, Telegenova, Quartarete TV, Telesiciliacolor, Videolina and Rete A.

To further encourage sales, the company offered, at its own expense, return trips by coach from all over Italy to customers who wanted to visit the Aiazzone sales point in Biella. In 1985, 70,000 people had been to the Corso Europa headquarters in Biella.

=== Crisis in the 1990s and acquisition of the brand ===
With Giorgio's death, caused by an air accident in 1986, in the nineties the company entered into crisis: GAT was dissolved and the headquarters of Biella fired part of the staff, opting for cooperation agreements and company mergers. The project for the construction of the "City of Furniture" in Verrone, a new commercial structure in which there would have been not only the point of sale, but also banks and restaurants, a few steps from Biella, ran aground, being abandoned together with the structure.

As late as 1994, the brand was the first in Italy in the sector, boasting an exclusive relationship with around a hundred medium or small-sized furniture companies, located mainly in the Biella area and Brianza, which supplied it with around 30 percent of its products. In 1997 Mobilificio Piemonte Srl was sold to the Franceschini group of Calenzano for 18 billion lire.

In the meantime, the headquarters in Corso Europa in Biella was taken over in 2002 by Mercatone Uno. The brand was acquired in 2008 by Renato Semeraro, who, together with Mete S.p.A. of the Borsano family, first opened some sales points with the Aiazzone brand in the provinces of Turin and Milan and then during 2009, converted the PerSempre Arredamenti network and part of the Emmelunga network into their brand with an almost national diffusion. Following economic, financial, fiscal as well as trade union problems, due to the new management of the two Borsano and Semeraro families united in the company B&S S.p.A., in July 2010, the Aiazzone brand was sold on rental to the Turin company Panmedia, which proceeded with the termination of the sales contracts between the customers of the Biella company.

=== Bankruptcy in 2010 and the legal events ===
After the bankruptcy declaration in 2010, at the beginning of the following year, Emmelunga and Aiazzone went through a serious financial situation, so much so that they were unable to respect sales contracts with customers and pay employees. Since March 2011 the furniture factory, whose branches are closed "for inventory purposes until further notice", stopped making deliveries, and was presented a petition for bankruptcy by suppliers and customers. The Turin Public Prosecutor's Office opened an investigation at the same time and the B&S lawyer was also entered in the register of suspects. Italia 1's program Le Iene also dealt with the conditions of the group. On March 28, Gian Mauro Borsano, Renato Semeraro and Giuseppe Gallo were arrested by the Financial Police, on the mandate of the investigating judge Giovanni De Donato, following the request of the Public Prosecutor of Rome, accused of fraudulent bankruptcy, destruction of accounting documents, money laundering, fraudulent evasion of the payment of taxes, false presentation of documentation to access the preventive agreement.

Borsano, Semeraro and Gallo would have used the companies of the B&S Group (indebted to the tax authorities for tens of millions of euros) to carry out fictitious sales of properties and company shareholdings, cash withdrawals and issuing false invoices for the benefit of new companies set up specifically for the purpose.

Subsequently, the same suspects would have fraudulently transferred the representation of the companies of the B&S group, now in crisis and emptied of all assets, and transferred, through a nominee, the representation of the companies to Bulgaria, resulting in their cancellation from the Italian company register to avoid the bankruptcy procedure. Furthermore, those arrested would have requested admission to the composition with the aim of avoiding the insolvency proceedings, providing non-existent financial guarantees and presenting false documents. Finally, for several years, taxes amounting to several tens of millions of euros would have been unpaid and the accounting books of the companies involved would have been hidden or destroyed.

During the course of the investigation, between 2010 and 2011 the protagonists were arrested, including Gianmauro Borsano, former president of Turin football, Renato Semeraro, Giuseppe Gallo, the accountant Marco Adami, followed by the suspension of the practice of the profession for the lawyer Maurizio Canfora.

=== Looting in 2011 ===
On 1 June 2011, an episode of looting was recorded at an abandoned warehouse of the company. The episode occurred in Pognano, where occasional thefts had already occurred since the previous month.

The episode, which had a moral justification from Paolo Ferrero of the Communist Refoundation Party, featured around two hundred people, considered creditors of the company. These gathered at the same time on the spot with cars, vans, pickup trucks and even some articulated trucks, forced the lock and robbed the structure. Subsequently, thanks to the intervention of the Carabinieri, four people were arrested for attempted theft and another forty were identified. Shortly thereafter, much of the merchandise was recovered.

== In popular culture ==
Aldo Grasso, in his 1992 essay History of Italian television, analyzed what with transparent irony he calls the "Aiazzone philosophy" of the various "seeing is believing":

...this aphoristic splinter, harsh and demanding in its thesis belongs to that constellation of thought that now goes under the name of Aiazzone philosophy...
These emergencies, unexpected in many ways, are nothing other than the triumph of underground TV; the praise of everyday life, the legitimation of the art of making do; even if there is always someone ready to argue that these black market shows express profound ideas (the spirit of the times), in reality these presences reveal worrying stretch marks, evident signs of weakness within a television system that is starting to be afraid of considering itself adult.

— Aldo Grasso, Storia della televisione italiana

As Stefano Grassi at La Repubblica reported on 11 April 1994, Giorgio Aiazzone's philosophy was to use new media to open its sales center to a virtually unlimited public and not to wait for customers to arrive spontaneously in its megastore, but to go and collect potential buyers directly, in every point of Italy and using TV, thus becoming the market leader in Italy.

In November 2006, Grasso himself, in the new edition of La televisione del sommerso, partially modified his positions on the phenomenon, recognizing that those formulas which were based on the TV of the underground, on the praise of everyday life, far from remaining confined to local television, have conquered, under the pressure of the Auditel data, a large space also on national networks. The Aiazzone advertising techniques and their medium-long term effects on sales have led some Italian marketing experts to define the "Aiazzone effect" as the phenomenon by which an excessive advertising campaign produces the opposite effect to the desired one: disaffection, rather than loyalty.

Stefano Zurlo on Il Giornale on 25 November 2007 underlines another innovation brought by Aiazzone, namely the immense potential of using consumer credit on a very large scale. The slogan was: «Payment in 36 months without bills». Paolo Prato, in his work L'Italia dei consume, 1965–2005, notes that the introduction of the zero rate allowed Aiazzone to achieve a turnover three times higher through financing compared to cash payments: Aiazzone had partnerships with Banca d'America e d'Italia and Citifin.

Even Claudio del Frate on Corriere della Sera on 19 March 2019 believed that the influence was because of

the power of commercials on private TV. Anyone who was around in the 80s cannot fail to remember "the delivery throughout Italy, including the islands", "the architects' invitation to lunch", the "seeing is believing" obsessively pronounced by Guido Angeli, teleseller who became a "guru" of the brand. Aiazzone became the owner of a network of small private channels from which he bombarded the airwaves with incessant teleshopping.

Indiscreto.info believes that this strategy constituted a strong point, in particular by placing "the Aiazzone brand also on furniture produced by others and selling it within a real Aiazzone City", "where those who entered were honored with watches and various gadgets, with discounts for restaurants and hotels, and were thus more willing to spend a day inside the furniture factory".

The company and its founder Giorgio Aiazzone were referenced in the film Fratelli d’Italia directed by Neri Parenti, when Roberto Marcolin, played by Jerry Calà, is defined as "the Messiah prophesized by Aiazzone", to the extent where he ironically cited the slogan provare per credere!.
