= Lombard Courtyard =

Housing style of the Po Valley, Italy

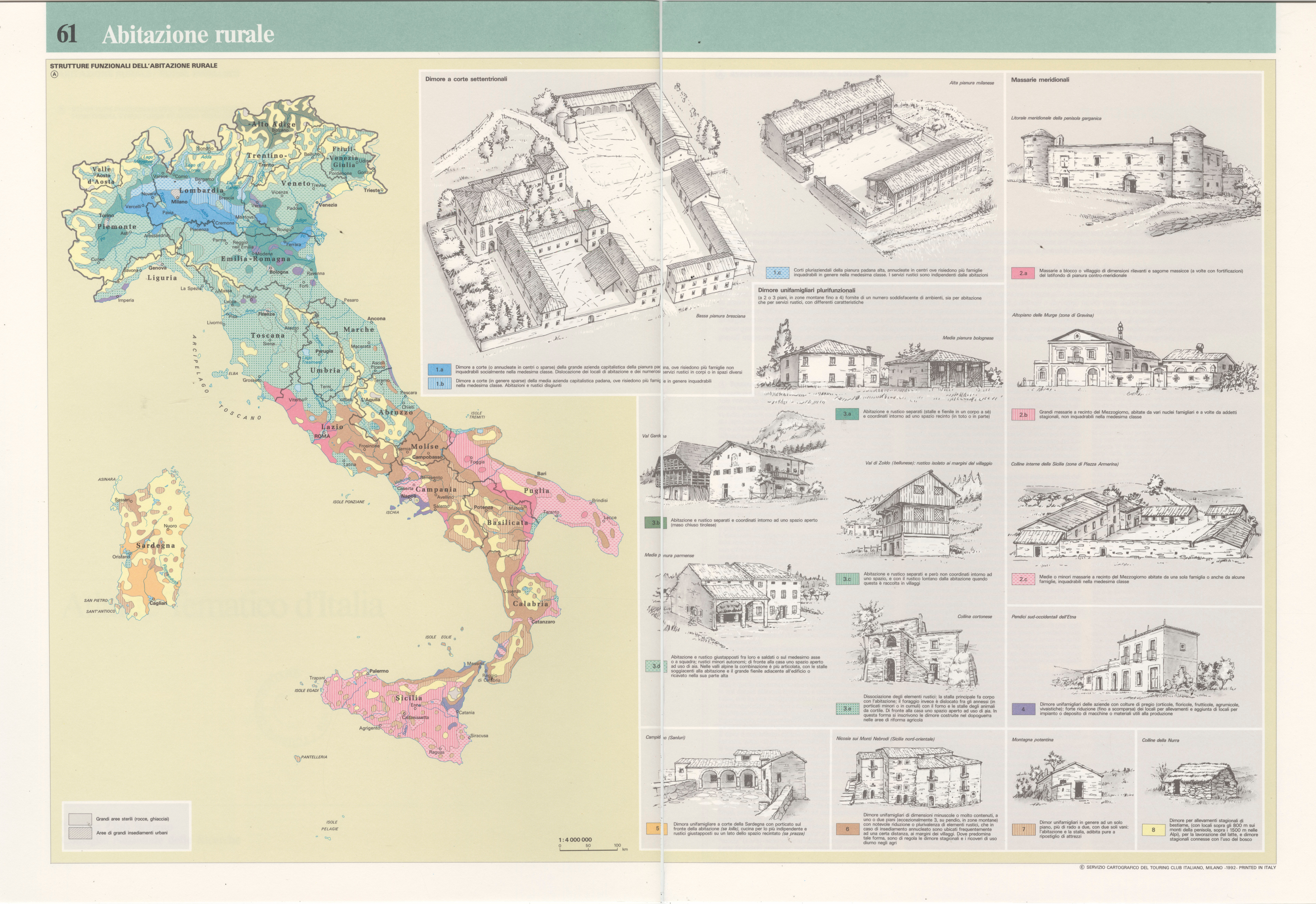
Map showing the spread of various types of rural dwellings in Italy.

The Lombard Courtyard (more simply courtyard) is a particular architectural housing typology of the Po Valley that is characterized by the presence of a courtyard around which the building complex develops. Lombard courtyards used for agricultural activities are known as farmsteads or corti coloniche.

== Generalities ==
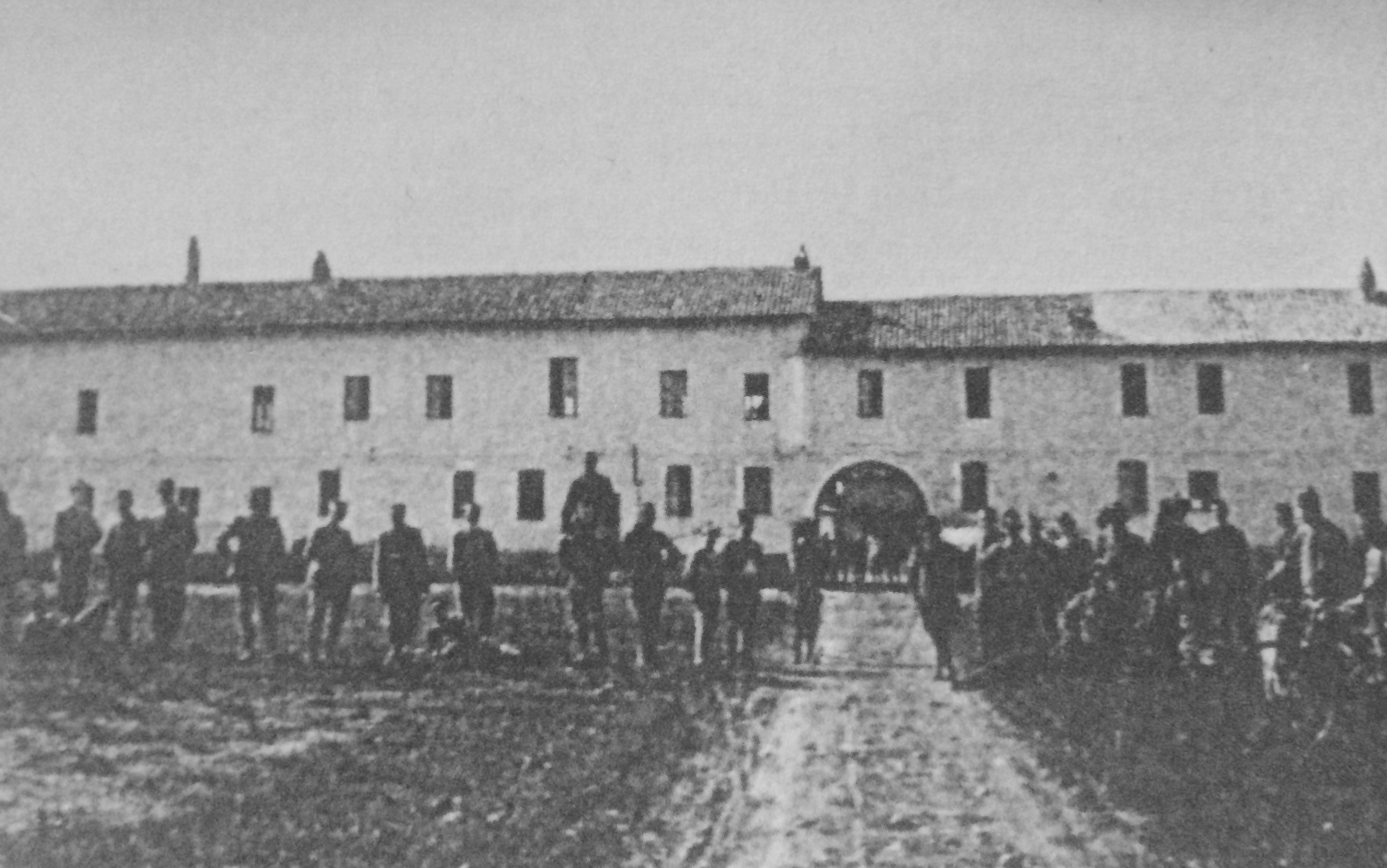
The Cascina Malpensa in a historical photo when it was used for military purposes. The Milan-Malpensa airport, located in the province of Varese, takes its name from this Lombard courtyard.

Lombard courtyards are a type of dwelling, called courtyard houses, which are built around a farmyard or courtyard and possess a single entrance from the street due to a main door. There are also more complex ones, with alleys or additional gates inside that connect multiple inner courtyards, together forming a small village.

The gradual aggregation of multiple courtyards around an original courtyard led to the formation of the historic centers of municipalities. If the primitive courtyards were large, a chapel was built to serve the inhabitants, which later could be transformed into a full-fledged church if the community-dwelling in the courtyards grew in number.

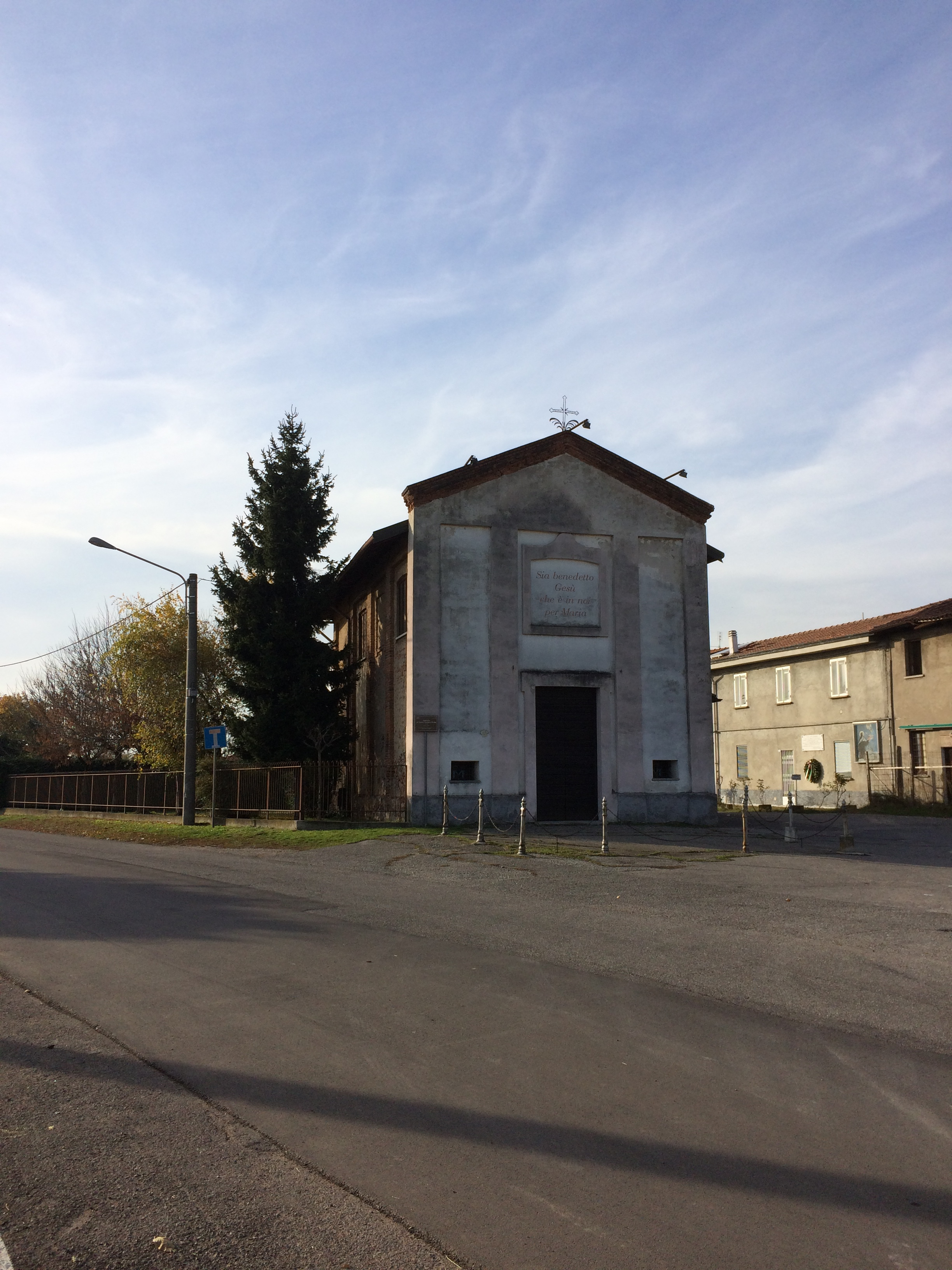
The Church of Santa Teresa d'Ávila in Legnano, a municipality in the metropolitan city of Milan, visible next to the Mazzafame farmstead, which can be seen on the right.

The tendency to build agglomerations of several Lombardy courts arose from several practical needs: the convenience of using common services (wells, ovens, roads, and others) and then the convenience, for the possessor of the land and dwellings, who was usually one, in not scattering real estate over the territory he owned, which was often vast in size. Indeed, property owners in individual municipalities were few and owned vast estates. Moreover, with the construction of scattered and isolated courts, land consumption would have been greater, especially considering the larger area of land needed to realize the services of each court.

The enclosed courtyard form of this type of building is explained by several factors. The first reason was related to the fact that the master or tenant farmer had to have the ability to easily supervise the productive activities that were once carried out within the courtyard. A second reason is the fact that anyone who entered the interior of the court had to be immediately recognized by its inhabitants, while the third reason descended from the need to have the dwellings and stables located separately, stables that had to be located in a specific place to promote their ventilation; and which were generally built in a north-south orientation. Lastly, the enclosed structure provided protection for both inhabitants and agricultural activities, particularly during times when banditry was a concern. For these reasons, the Lombard courtyard has a typical L-shaped, U-shaped, or fully enclosed plan.

== History and dissemination ==
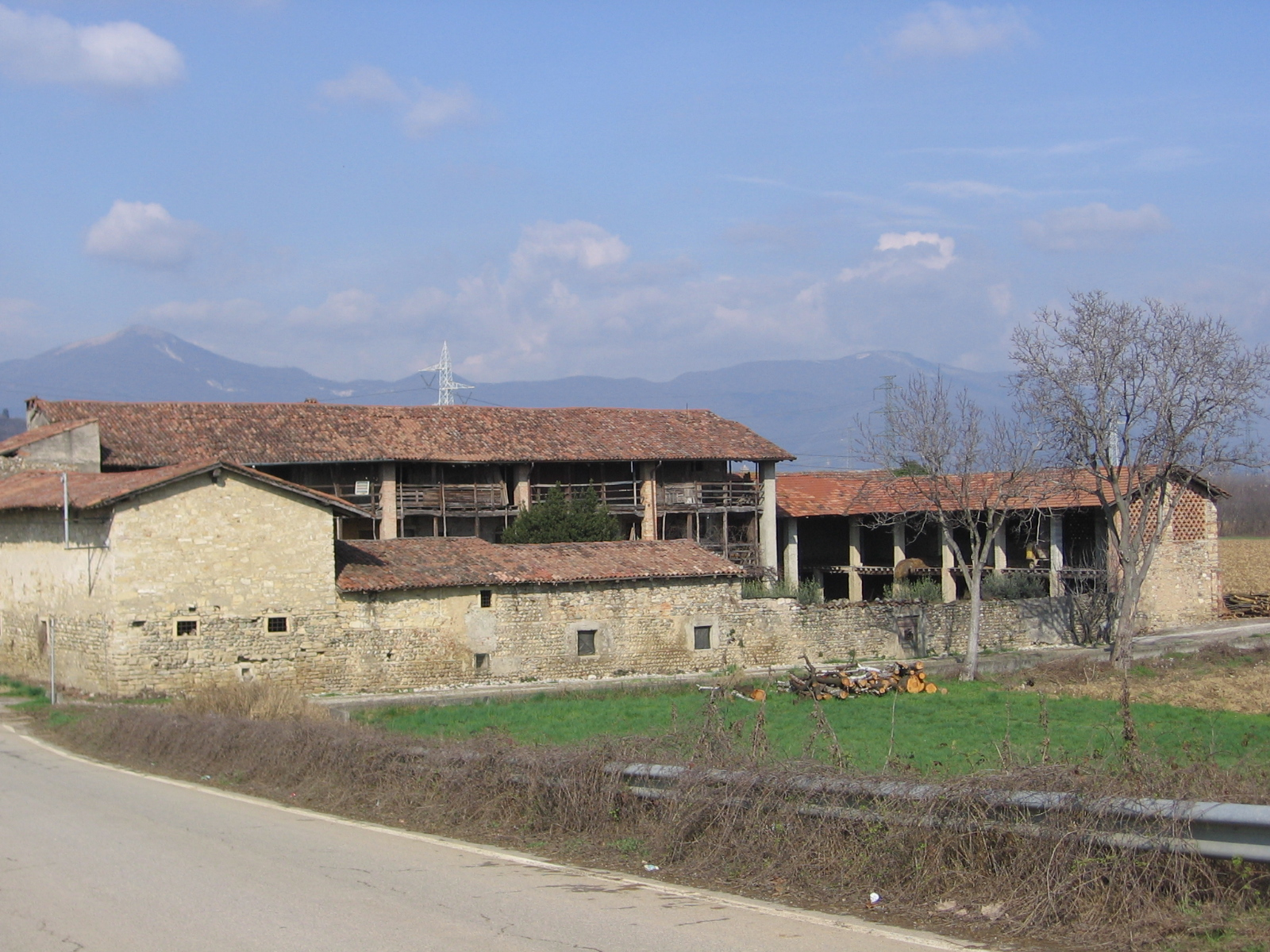
Lombard courtyard in Bagnatica, in the province of Bergamo.

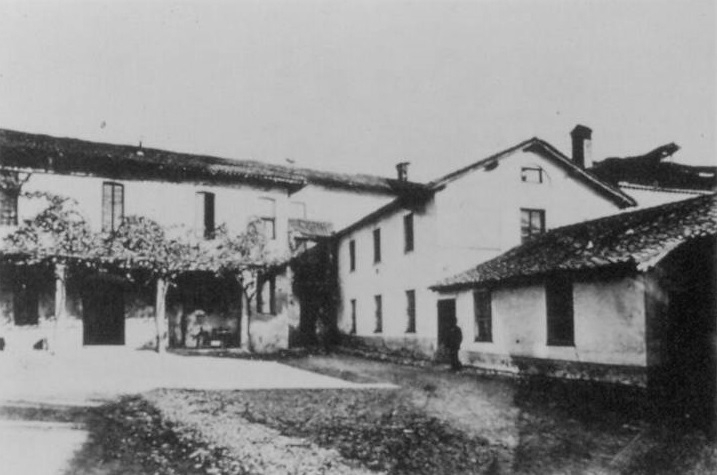
Pomponio mill in Legnano, later demolished. This watermill that arose along the Olona River was also a typical Lombard courtyard.

The origins of farmsteads date back to feudalism, at the height of medieval times. The earliest documented records of farmsteads, which date back to the 10th century, refer to constructions made of clay and straw, whose purpose was that of agricultural storage and barn. Alongside these agricultural infrastructures were farmers' dwellings. As early as the mid-13th century, in some areas of Lombardy, such as in the Pavia and Milanese countryside, centralized farms had sprung up, equipped with cassinas, stables, houses, mills, and defended by towers. Some of them were later transformed into "court" farmsteads, and several have been preserved to the present day. On the other hand, it was from the second part of the 17th century that the characteristic "courtyard" form, that is, closed on the sides, was created.

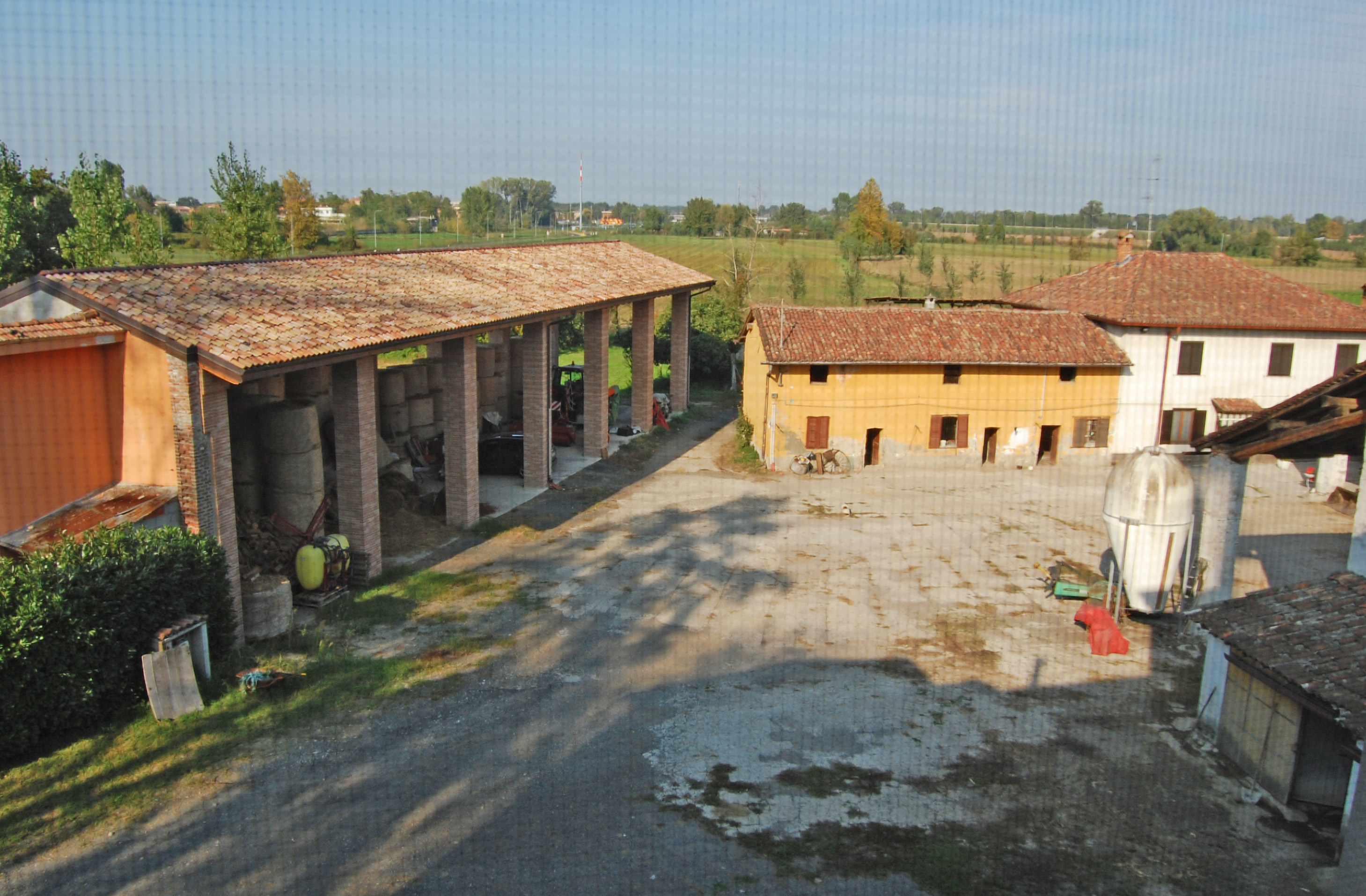
A Lombard courtyard on the outskirts of Lodi.

The term "farmstead" first appeared in documents in the 12th century. The etymology comes from the Vulgar Latin word cassia, meaning "enclosure for beasts." Later it changed from capsia to capsina, then to cassina, and finally to "farmstead." Other scholars speculate instead that "cascina" comes from the Latin word caseus, meaning "cheese," which is a synonym for "cheese." Since the earliest history of farmsteads, cheese was produced within them.

Lombard courts are concentrated in the provinces of Milan, Monza, Lodi, Cremona, and Mantua, in the lowland parts of the provinces of Bergamo, Brescia, and Varese, in the Brianza part of the provinces of Como and Lecco, and in the province of Pavia except for Oltrepò Pavese. Outside the borders of the modern region of Lombardy, Lombard courts can be found in the provinces of Vercelli, Biella, and Novara, in the flat parts of the provinces of Turin, Alessandria, and Asti, and a limited area of Emilia-Romagna. South of the Apennines, the court typology is also present with specific and peculiar forms in the plain of Lucca (Corte Lucchese).

== Architecture ==
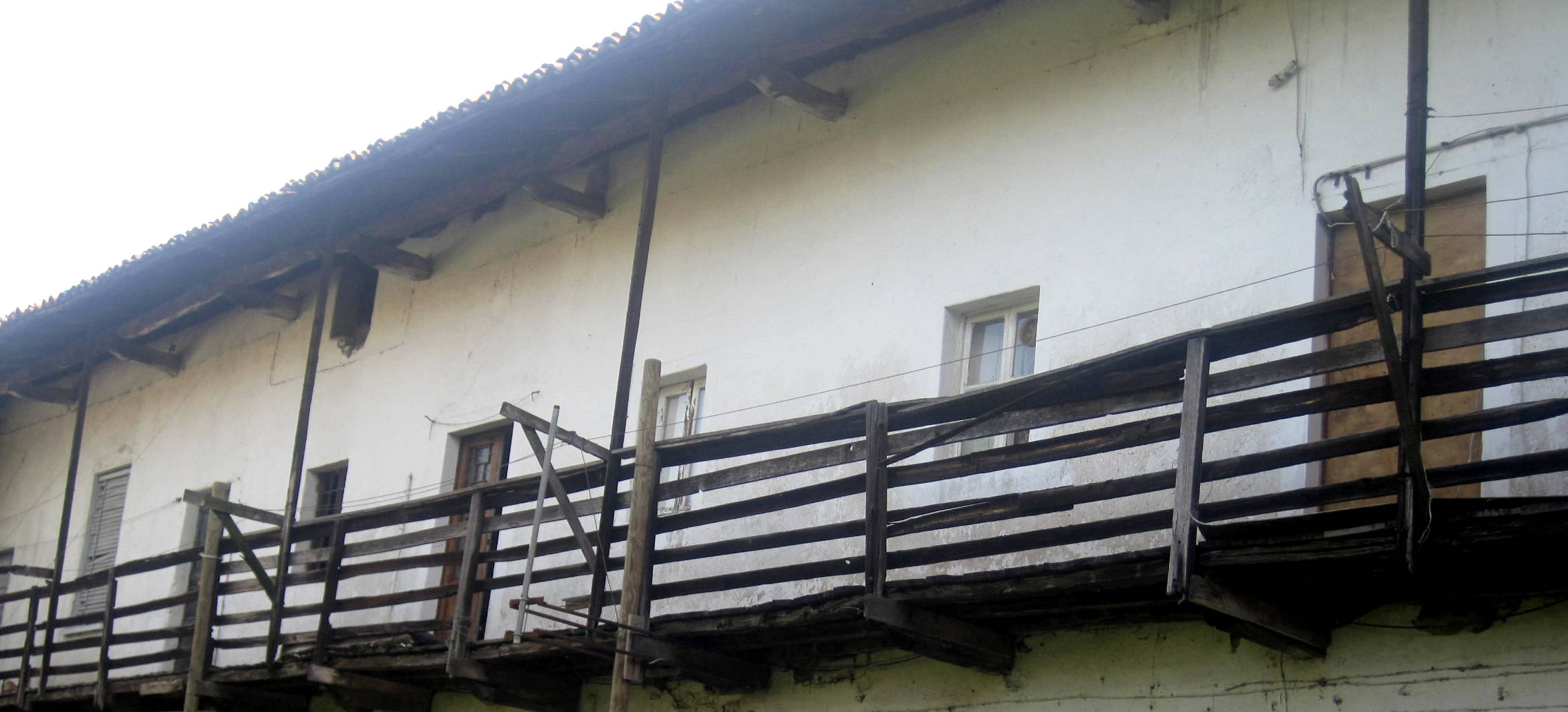
Ballatoi of the Burattana farmstead in Borsano, a hamlet of Busto Arsizio, Varese province.

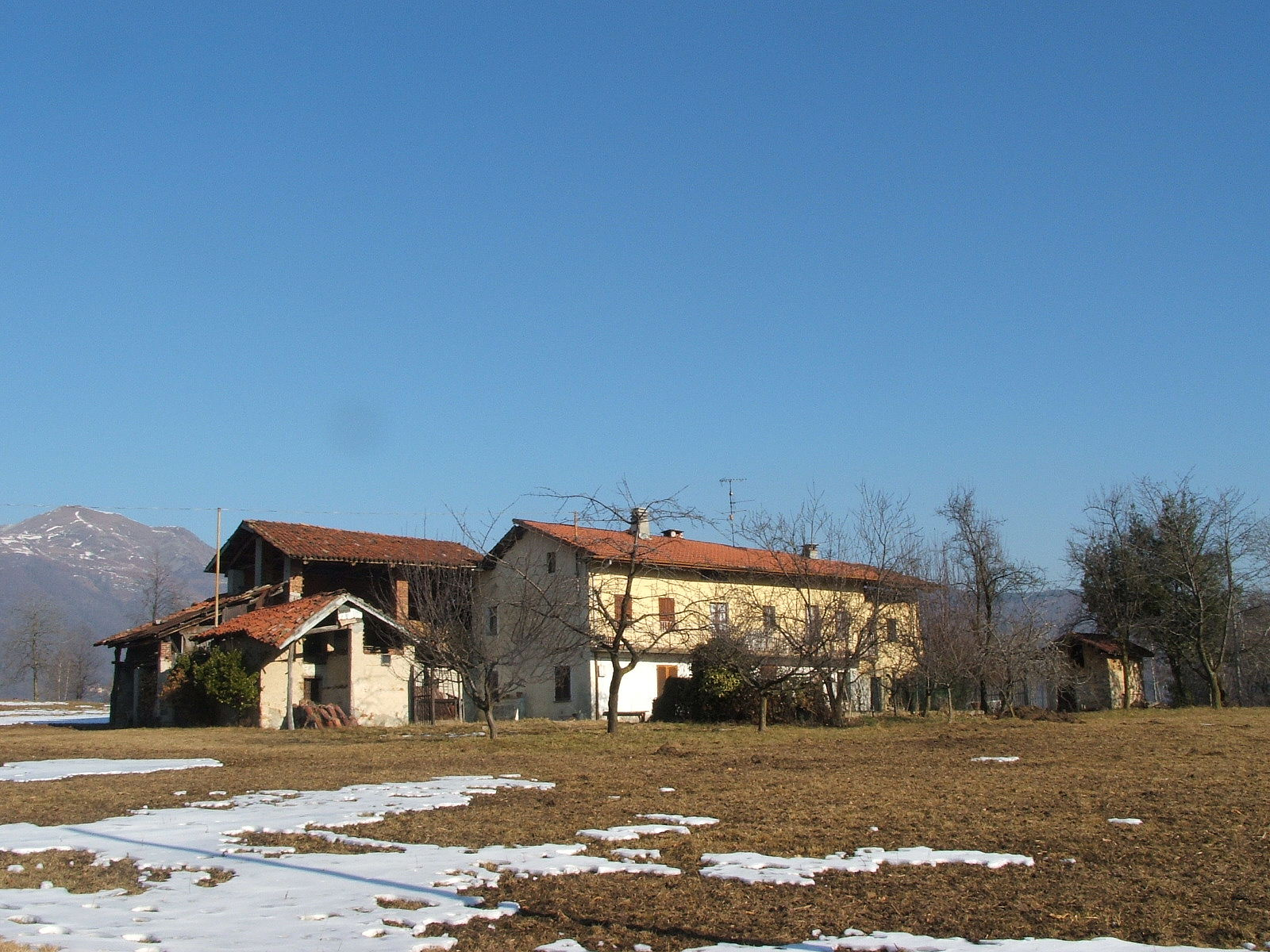
The Caramelletto farmstead in Tollegno, in the province of Biella.

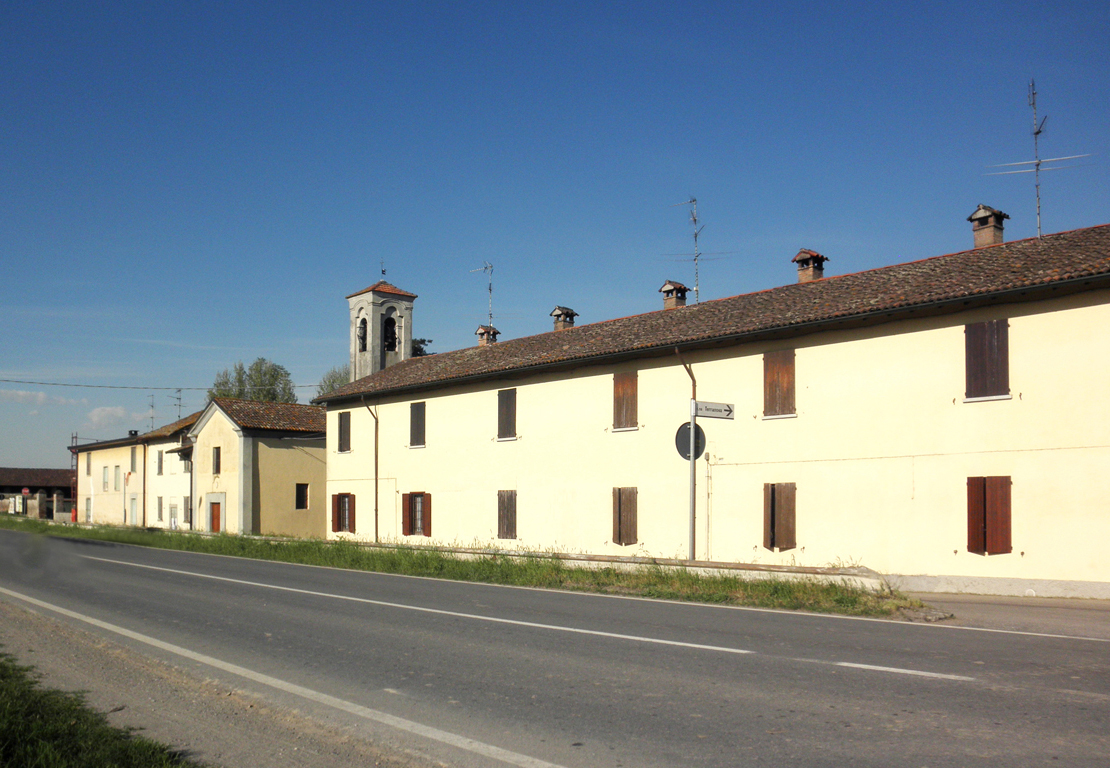
Cascina Terranova farmhouse in Terranova dei Passerini, in the province of Lodi.

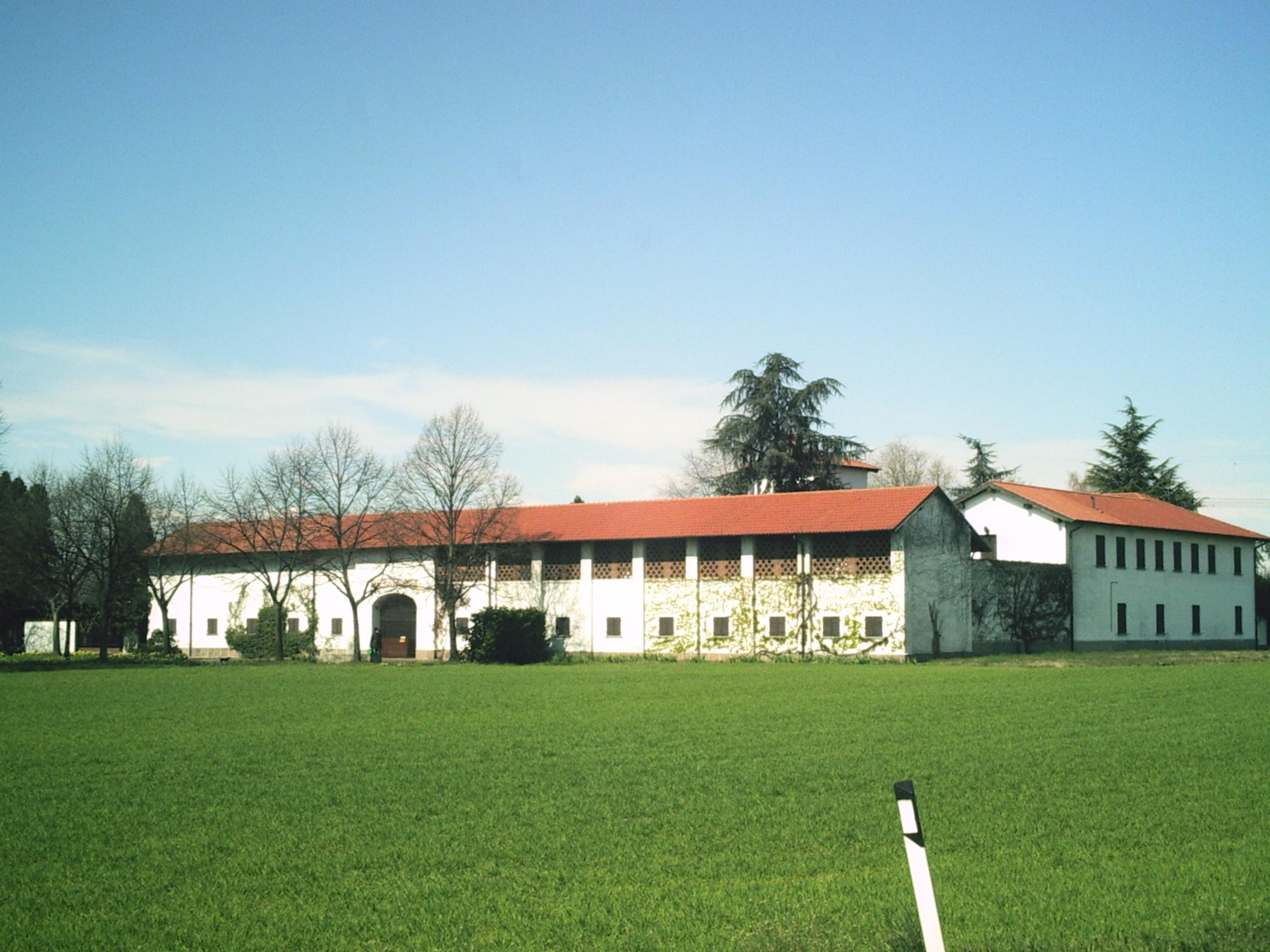
Cascina Frisasca, on the border between Arluno and Parabiago, in Roccolo Park, in the metropolitan city of Milan. It is characterized by the typical perforated brick walls.

These houses are built of mortar and stone (more rarely brick) with a tiled roof. Instead, the attic, windows, shutters, and front door are made of wood. One of the most famous features of courtyards in the Po Valley is the railing. Railings are protections made of wood or metal, delimiting the walkways inside the courtyard facing the rooms on the upper floors. Lombard courtyards, which rarely feature exposed brick, almost always have exterior plaster that is spread evenly on the walls. Originally, the colors used for painting were mostly gray, white, and yellow. Other shades of color are rare.

In the center of the courtyard is the threshing floor that was once used, among other things, for threshing and threshing grain. It was originally made of rammed earth or paved with bricks, while in modern times the roof is often made of concrete. Another characteristic element of Lombard courtyards is the entrance door, which may sometimes have decorations and pilasters. The gateway may be placed along the boundary wall, on the border between two buildings, or in the middle of a wing of the courtyard.

Many buildings present a rational arrangement of rooms. In one part of the courtyard are the houses arranged in a row where, on the upper floor, the bedrooms are located, and, on the lower floor, the room used for living. The rooms on the upper floor can be reached by ascending an outside staircase leading to walkways with railings. A fireplace also heated, through the heat of the chimney, the respective rooms on the upper floor. In another part, separated from the previous one and built as a block parallel to the dwellings, in the case of a farm there are the stable and the chicken coop on the ground floor, and the barn on the second floor, as well as all the rooms serving the agricultural activity as well as the private vegetable garden, a private vegetable garden that in the farmsteads of the Alto Milanese is generally located in the courtyard.

For larger courtyards, there may be three floors, with the stairs passing inside the body of the building and opening into wide balconies, balconies under which, on the ground floor, may correspond to a porch that is often used for agricultural activities.

The stables and barns are open to the outside and are bordered by a row of columns Outside there is a trough, later replaced by the automatic trough that runs water inside the stables. In larger stables, the central part is used for milking and manure collection. Hay, on the other hand, is lowered from above thanks to a trapdoor. The stables are divided by firewalls. Ventilation is provided by windows perforated brick walls: the latter, in particular, are one of the characteristic elements of isolated Lombardy courtyards and more rarely of typical courtyards in the historic centers of municipalities. The stable also played a social role as a place for the inhabitants to gather during winter evenings in animal warmth. Another room that may be present in Lombard courtyards is the case, or the place where cheese is made.

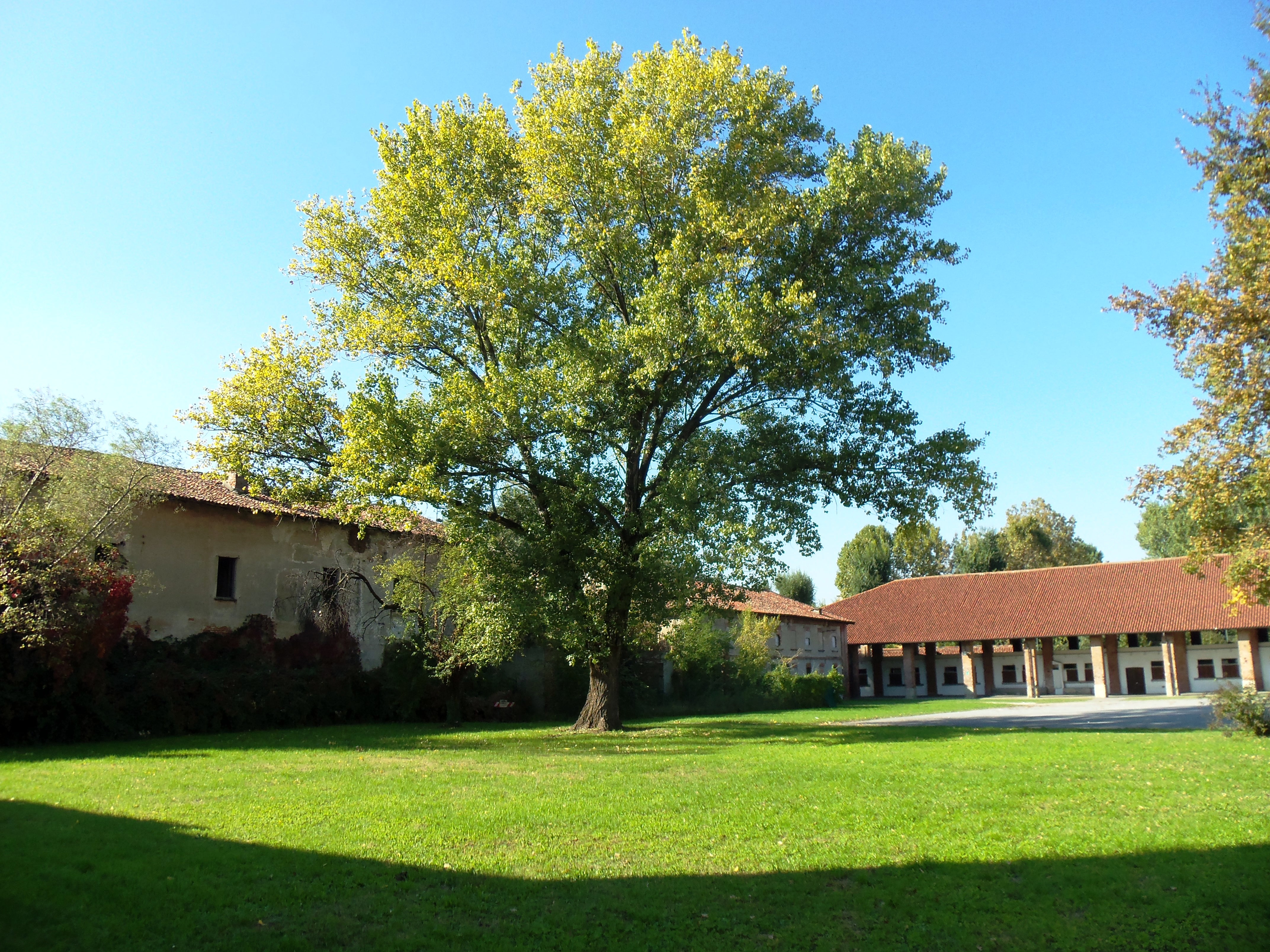
Cascina Monlué in Milan.

In the past, individual dwellings did not have bathrooms inside them, but only one shared outdoor toilet located in the center of the courtyard. In the case of activities aimed at agricultural production, the presence of a porch was typical, which was called a "Rustico" and consisted of a series of columns supporting a tiled roof that delimited an open space on the sides, subject to an enclosing wall on one or more sides.

Neither is the alignment of the various bodies of buildings random. Typically, the stables and barns are either set against and aligned with the building intended for housing, with the latter generally having larger dimensions than the other parts of the courtyard, or placed at right angles.

Also organized as courts are the many aristocratic mansions found in the upper Po Valley, mostly in Brianza, Varesotto, and Comasco, areas once characterized by vast forests. They were built by city aristocratic families to have a more salubrious vacation spot than the original one, which was as mosquito-infested as the areas of the lower Po Valley. These noble villas were often complemented by parks, fishponds, and hunting grounds. The vast agricultural areas that surrounded them were a source of income for the nobles, as they were worked by local farmers.

== The modern uses ==
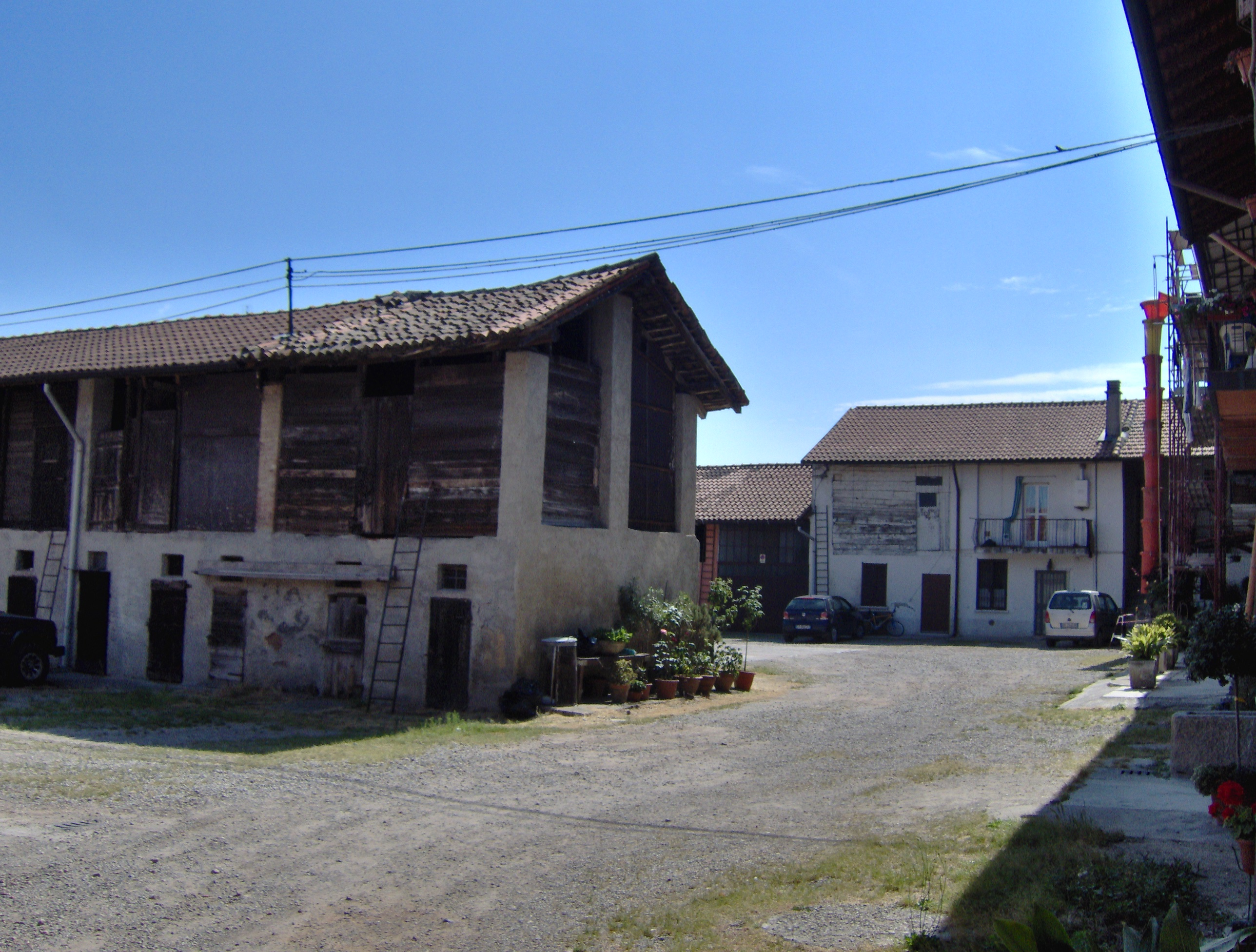
Cascina Guascona in Milan.

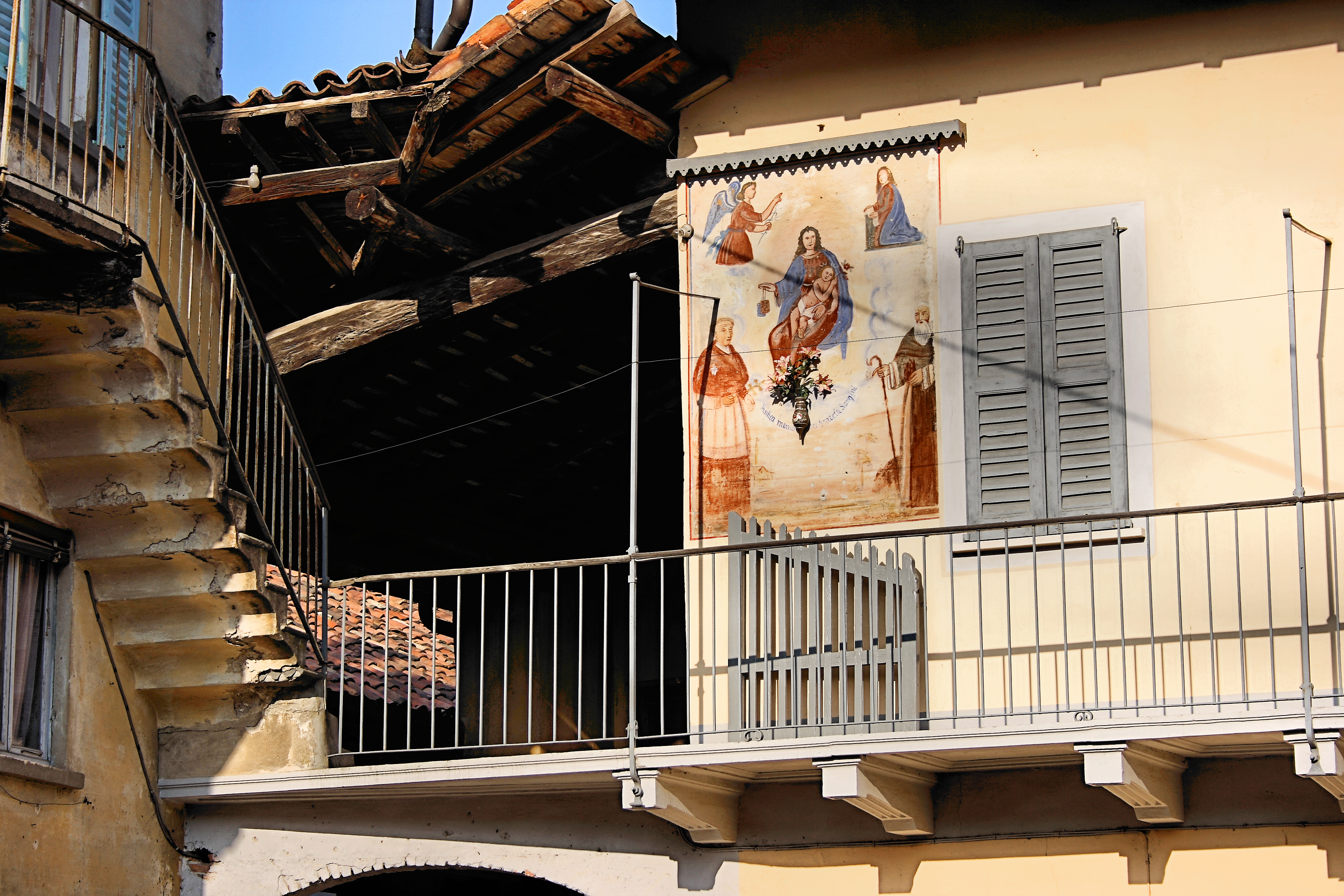
Glimpse of a Lombard courtyard in Gurone, a hamlet of Malnate, in the province of Varese, Italy.

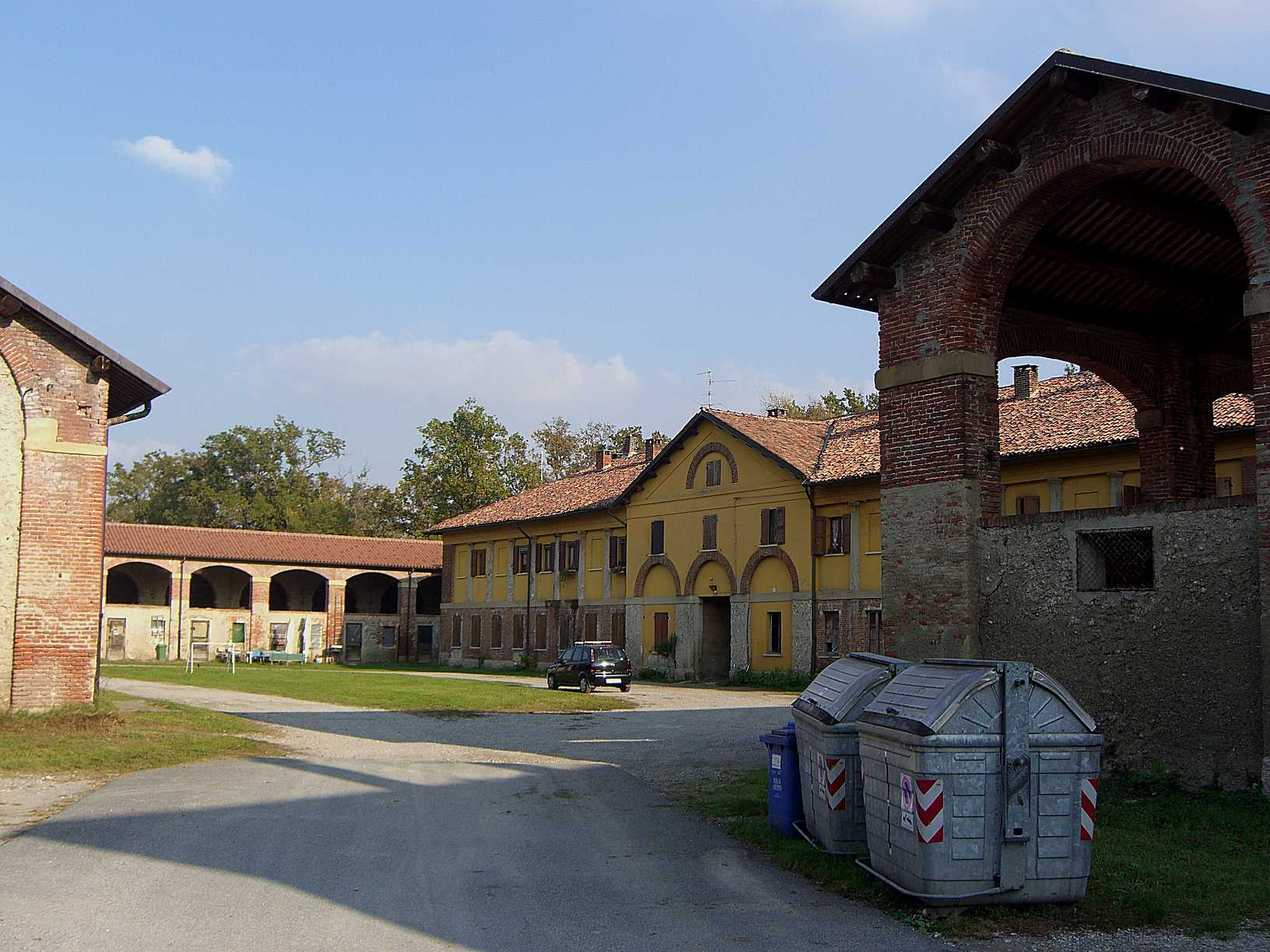
Casalta farmstead, which is located within the Monza Park.

The first change inherent in the old Lombard courts can be dated to the end of the 19th century. With the advent of industrialization, many owners decided to diversify their interests and also became entrepreneurs.

Also to flaunt their wealth, landlords renovated the old courtyards where they lived, giving them a more refined and less rustic appearance, and recalling the style of the manor houses belonging to the emerging industrial bourgeoisie of the time, which were characterized by an elegant and prestigious aesthetic. Landlords who did not become industrialists also followed this trend. In this way, some Lombard courts took on a less humble and more gentrified appearance.

A second change is related to the modernization of agricultural processes that began to take hold in the 19th century. Thanks to the new agricultural processes, the physiognomy of the old courtyards changed radically. Some rooms were eliminated, such as those used as a camera, or the part of the building intended for the lodging of tenants. In fact, from the first part of the 20th century, the type of owner also changed significantly: large property owners began to fractionate their property into small parts, which they sold to their former tenants. This process of property fractionation was particularly marked in the Varesotto and Upper Milanese areas. In addition to what has already been mentioned, Lombard courts used for agricultural activities underwent other changes, such as the modernization of stables and the installation of silos.

Of the following decades, however, is the eventual fate of many other Lombard courts. Due to the great building expansion of the 20th century, which was caused by the constant population increase, many of them were demolished to make way for modern buildings. Other courtyards were renovated and converted to commercial, public use with social purposes, institutional, or exclusively residential use. The latter destination has been very common for courtyards in the Alto Milanese, which have always been more skewed toward residential use. Other courtyards have become ruins, and many others have suffered building abuse that has completely distorted their original architectural features. Since the end of the 20th century, a sensibility began to mature that has led to gradual and steady improvement in the quality of building interventions on courtyards, which have gradually become more and more respectful of the ancient architectural style of this type of buildings.

== In the mass culture ==
Life in the courts of Lombardy has been based, since their inception, on the theatrical shows of the dialect group I Legnanesi, founded in 1949 by Felice Musazzi and Tony Barlocco.

== See also ==
- Cascina a corte
- Lombards

== Bibliography ==
- Bernareggi, Adriano (2015). Cascine milanesi [Milanese farmhouses] (in Italian). Meravigli. ISBN 978-88-79-55352-0.
- Bisi, Lucia (1980). Da privato a pubblico. Acquisizione di ville, palazzi, cascine e giardini nei comuni della provincia di Milano [From private to public. Acquisition of villas, palaces, farmsteads, and gardens in the municipalities of the province of Milan.] (in Italian). Mazzotta. ISBN 88-202-0458-4.
- Orlandi, Piero; Presicci (1993). Cascine in Lombardia [Farmsteads in Lombardy] (in Italian). Celip. ISBN 978-88-871-5204-3.
