= Lambert Lombard =

Renaissance painter from Prince-Bishopric of Liège

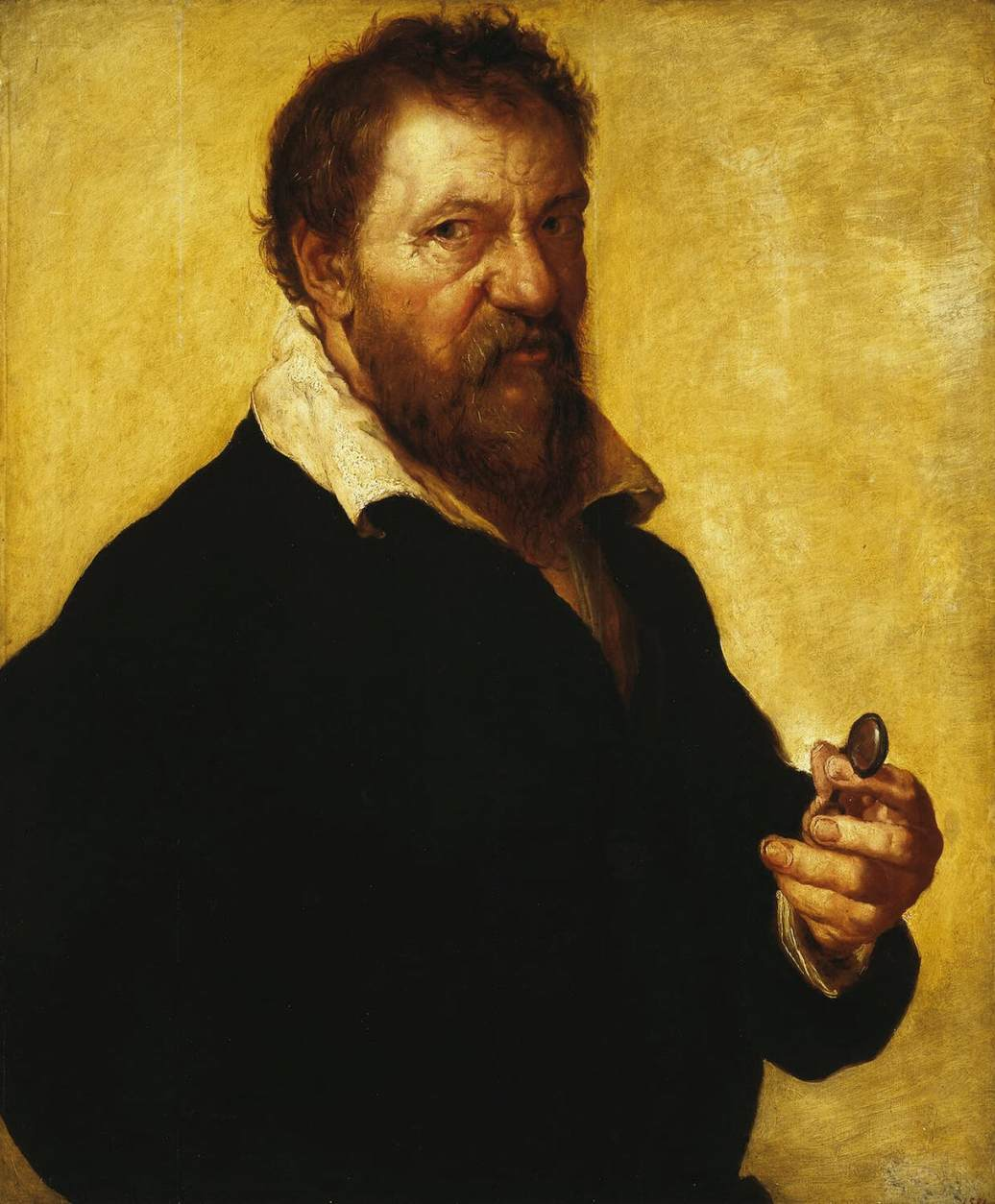
- Born: 1505
- Died: 1566 (aged 60–61)
- Known for: Painting

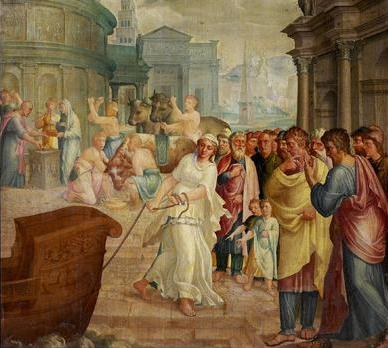
Les Femmes Vertueuses

Lambert Lombard (French pronunciation: [lɑ̃bɛʁ lɔ̃baʁ]; c. 1505 – August 1566) was a Renaissance painter, architect and theorist for the Prince-Bishopric of Liège. During his career he worked for Jan Gossaert in Middelburg and trained Frans Floris.

== Biography ==
Lombard was born in Liège, where in 1532 he became court painter and architect. A few paintings and many drawings have been preserved.

In 1537, he was sent to Rome by Érard de La Marck, prince-bishop of Liège, to buy works of art, and he discovered the wonders of the Italian Renaissance. On his return he brought not only works of art, but also the new ideas concerning art and the position of the artist, to Liège.

His pupils were Frans Floris, Hendrick Goltzius, Willem Key, Dominicus Lampsonius, Jean Ramey, and Lambert Zutman.

Dominicus Lampsonius wrote a biography of Lombard, The Life of Lambert Lombard.

== See also ==
- Lombard Courtyard
