= Pralungo =

- Comune
- Comune di Pralungo
- Coat of arms

- Location within Italy Location within Piedmont
- Coordinates: 45°30′N 8°10′E
- Country: Italy
- Region: Piedmont
- Province: Biella (BI)
- Frazioni: Valle, Sant'Eurosia

Government
  - Mayor: Maurizio Benna

Area
  - Total: 7.2 km^{2} (2.8 sq mi)
- Elevation: 554 m (1,818 ft)

Population (Dec. 2004)
  - Total: 2,734
  - Density: 380/km^{2} (980/sq mi)
- Demonym: Pralunghesi
- Time zone: UTC+1 (CET)
  - Summer (DST): UTC+2 (CEST)
- Postal code: 13899
- Dialing code: 015

Pralungo is a comune (municipality) in the Province of Biella in the Italian region Piedmont, located about 70 kilometres (43 mi) northeast of Turin and just north of Biella.

The municipality of Pralungo contains the frazioni (subdivisions, mainly villages and hamlets) Valle and Sant'Eurosia.

Pralungo borders the following municipalities: Biella, Sagliano Micca, Tollegno.
