= All Music TV =

All Music
- Country: Italy
- Broadcast area: Italy

Programming
- Language: Italian
- Picture format: 4:3 SDTV

Ownership
- Owner: Gruppo Editoriale L'Espresso

History
- Launched: 5 October 2005; 20 years ago
- Replaced: Rete A
- Closed: 19 October 2009; 16 years ago
- Replaced by: DeeJay TV

All Music was an Italian television network owned by Gruppo Editoriale L'Espresso. It was created following the takeover of the former Rete A network and was replaced by Deejay TV in 2009.

== History ==
The channel's origins date back to 2002, when Rete A's agreement with the German channel VIVA was broken, creating Rete A - All Music. In autumn 2004, Rete A - All Music was acquired by Gruppo Editoriale L'Espresso for €115 million. From 3 October 2005, All Music took over the transmitter network; at the time, analog coverage was estimated to reach 80% of Italy, while digital terrestrial coverage was limited to 50%. Elisa Ambanelli, formerly of Italia 1, La7 and Endemol Italia, was appointed its first programming director.

On 5 March 2009, the network shut down its production studios, anticipating its closure on 19 October 2009 due to a corporate restructuring by Gruppo Editoriale L'Espresso to address its economic crisis. Its terrestrial slot was replaced by Deejay TV, which from 19 October to 9 November carried a transitional countdown, while its directorate was handed over to Linus (artistic director of Radio Deejay and m2o).
