= Rete A =

- Country: Italy
- Broadcast area: Italy

Programming
- Language: Italian
- Picture format: 4:3 SDTV

Ownership
- Owner: Gruppo Editoriale Peruzzo

History
- Launched: 2 January 1983; 43 years ago
- Closed: 3 October 2005; 20 years ago
- Replaced by: All Music TV

Rete A was an Italian television network owned by Gruppo Editoriale Peruzzo of Alberto Peruzzo. Personalities such as Wanna Marchi, Maurizia Paradiso and Guido Angeli became famous because of this network. In the 1980s, it broadcast successful Latin American telenovelas (mostly from Televisa) such as Los ricos también lloran, El derecho de nacer, De pura sangre, Tú o nadie, Cuna de lobos, El extraño retorno de Diana Salazar, El pecado de Oyuki, Vivir un poco and Rosa selvaje. From the mid-90s, it started relaying MTV (previously relayed in Italy on local TV stations) and VIVA, foreign music networks of international relevance.

The brand ceased to exist in 2005 when it was replaced by All Music TV, and its frequencies were acquired by Gruppo Editoriale L'Espresso, which imposed it creating a DVB-T multiplex, later managed by a company that only exploited multiplexes, Persidera, born as a joint venture between Gruppo L'Espresso and Telecom Italia Media.

== History ==
=== 1980s ===
Rete A was born on 2 January 1983 on the initiative of Alberto Peruzzo, in the form of syndication, i.e. a national television circuit made up of various local television stations that broadcast the same programs with a common brand simultaneously throughout the national territory, distributed in the form of pre-recorded cassettes from a single central office. The syndication leader was the Lombardy regional broadcaster Canale 51, owned by Alberto Peruzzo himself and founded by him in 1977 under the name Milano TV.

In addition to Canale 51 (which had just left the Rete 4 network of Mondadori, of which it had been part for a year from 4 January 1982) also part of the nascent syndication were, among others, two local TV stations which had already been broadcasting under the name "Rete A" for years: Rete A of Florence and Rete A of Bologna, both owned by the Poligrafici Editoriale group, which he had linked them respectively to the newspapers La Nazione and Il Resto del Carlino. These two stations (which during 1982 had retransmitted Italia 1 by Rusconi) were sold to Peruzzo in conjunction with the creation of its television circuit, which adopted their name at a national level. The network's advertising sales were managed by Publitalia '80 of the Fininvest group. The network jingle was sung by Paul Simon and Art Garfunkel.

The network's headquarters, including signal broadcasting, was inside Peruzzo's palace in Sesto San Giovanni in Viale Ercole Marelli 165, while the transmission studios were located in the basement of a residential condominium in Via Stromboli, 18 in Milan.

Born with a generalist character, over time Rete A addressed a target female audience, a programming based mainly on telenovelass produced in Mexico (from the Televisa back catalog, with the stars of the series of the eighties Verónica Castro and Lucía Méndez), telesales and programs for children. Paolo Romani is designated as general director of the network.

In 1984 Ettore Andenna arrived, fresh from the successes of La bustarella on Antenna 3 Lombardia, who brought the team game Montecitorio, a program which did not have a great following. The following year, the internal production of telenovelas began, which led to the prime time broadcast of the first entirely Italian telenovela, Felicità... dove sei, set in Milan and starring Verónica Castro, her sister Beatriz, with an otherwise Italian cast. The program does not find the consensus of the public as hoped. In 1986, the pedagogical series for children The treasure of knowledge and some Mexican telenovelas such as Cuna de lobos were purchased.

The morning and early afternoon slots were occupied by Accendi un'amica, presented by Guido Angeli, provider of editorials, oroscopi, service columns and, above all, teleshopping conducted by Angeli himself, who with his gestures, his catchphrases, his slogans and his way of presenting the products, was among the first to introduce the figure of the telemarketer into Italy; in the early nineties the program was replaced by the similar Teleclub, also hosted by Angeli. Another teleshopping presenter of the period was Wanna Marchi, who presented her own program in the late evening, Wanna Marchi Show, which also offered goods produced and distributed by itself. On 15 July 1986, both hosts presented a program in two episodes, Remembering a friend, in memory of Giorgio Aiazzone, owner of the famous furniture factory of the same Biellan advertised by the network.. The night time slot was instead occupied by programs with an automotive background with the program La Vetrina dell'Auto by Publi Rose (which entered the schedule in February 1987) and by programs with an erotic background, collected in the container Magico mondo di notte, starring the transsexual Maurizia Paradiso. Also on Rete A, Paradiso also hosted the variety show Colpo di scena in 1992.

In 1987 Emilio Fede, already presenting TG1, contributed to the creation of TgA, becoming also its director, the first national private newscast on Italian television, on air from November 7 of the same year. Thanks to another Mexican telenovela, Rosa selvaje, in 1988 its ratings increased by 400%.

=== 1990s: from generalist channel to home shopping channel ===
Following competition from Rete 4, which has greater resources and visibility thanks to the publishing group to which it is owned, the network makes a series of corrections in scheduling strategies. Thanks to the Mammì Law, in 1992 the network officially obtained the broadcasting license as a national channel, acquiring its own frequencies. From 1990 to 1992 Tonino Polistena, Gigio D'Ambrosio and Francesco Perilli alternated as hosts of the TGA. Furthermore, the editorial team availed itself of the consultancy of Maurizio Mosca for the creation of specials dedicated to sport.

Since the 1993-94 season, the schedule, with the exception of TGA and some economic editorials, has been composed almost exclusively of teleshopping. In the autumn of 1993, "Shopping Club" was born, where it makes use of well-known TV faces including: Franca Rizzi, Paolo Frattini (presenter of Telemarket), Roberto Zorzenone, Rinaldo Denti, the comedian Franco Romeo and the popular telemarketer Sergio Baracco. The telesales manager of "Shopping Club" was Nino Martinelli. The last programming dates back to 31 August 1997.

In 1991, Rete A also obtained a teletext service: called TVTEXT, with commercial but also service content, where viewers can find information on programs and frequencies, as well as Peruzzo's editorial initiatives. From 1997 to 2000, Rete A's teletext essentially became the Italian version of MTV Text, except for the pre-existing "service" sections, then from 2000 it returned entirely to the prerogative of the national broadcaster and finally concluded the service at the beginning of 2006.

=== 1997: becoming a music channel ===
In 1997, the company inks an agreement with MTV Europe to air its programming nationwide, interspersed by TGA and morning home shopping programs. On 3 June of the same year, a provision was issued by the Ministry of Communications which extended the coverage of Rete A to various Italian provinces not yet reached by its signal, including a large part of Sardinia and Sicily, thanks to the reassignment of the frequencies of Vetrina D+, which ceased broadcasts over the air on 31 December 1997, while continuing to be present on satellite.

=== 2000s: becoming All Music and closure ===
The agreement with MTV put the government concession at risk in 2000, because the ministry of communications believed that the editorial line of the network was effectively controlled, through the advertising concessionaire, by Viacom, owner of MTV. Still in 2000, it signed an agreement with VIVA to replace MTV, which, in its turn, becomes TMC 2, to then definitively replace the latter in conjunction with the birth of La7 the following year. The agreement provided for the broadcast of 70% of programs produced in Italy and the remaining 30% of German productions. Thus, Rete A - VIVA was born, music channel with programs presented by Italian veejays such as Lucilla Agosti, Christian Bani, Sara Valbusa, Alessandro Cattelan and Elisabetta Di Carlo. The agreement was broken in spring 2002 when it renamed itself to Rete A - All Music, proposing a schedule substantially the same as the previous one, with various musical programs and columns and rotation of music videos. In autumn 2004, Rete A - All Music was acquired by Gruppo Editoriale L'Espresso for €115 million. From 3 October 2005, started broadcasting only under the name All Music, and moved to the Milanese headquarters of the company, at Via Nervesa 21.

== Affiliates ==
Rete A was a syndication from 1983 to 1992. Regions covered by the signal at the time were Trentino-Alto Adige, Veneto, Friuli-Venezia Giulia and some areas of Piemonte, Umbria, Molise, Basilicata and Sicily.

- Valle d'Aosta
  - Radio Tele Aosta
- Piemonte
  - Cuneo TV
- Lazio
  - Telefantasy
- Lombardia
  - Canale 51 (head station of the syndication)
  - Bergamo TV
- Liguria
  - Telespazio
  - TeleSanRemo
  - Savona TV
  - Tele Arcobaleno
  - Canale 7
- Emilia-Romagna
  - V.G.A. Telerimini
  - R.T.E. Radio Televisione Emiliana
- Marche
  - I.T.V.
- Toscana e Umbria
  - Rete A Telenazione
- Abruzzo e Molise
  - Telemare
  - Atv7
  - Telenove
- Campania
  - Telecolore
  - Telestudio 50
  - Rete Azzurra
- Puglia e Basilicata
  - TeleLecceBarbano
  - Telefoggia
  - Studio 100
  - Telebari
- Calabria
  - Telespazio Calabria 2
- Sicilia
  - Radio Televisione Peloritana
  - Telesicilia
  - Video 3
  - Tele Catania
  - Video Sicilia
- Sardegna
  - La Voce Sarda
  - Bibisi

== Announcer ==
Even Rete A, following the pattern of the national television networks, had its own continuity announcer, Elena Mazza, active from 1983 to 1993, when the channel abandoned its generalist vocation becoming a home shopping channel, causing her to renounce from her position.

== Bibliography ==
- Grasso, Aldo (2008). Enciclopedia della televisione (3rd ed.). Garzanti Editore. ISBN 978-88-11-50526-6.
- Giancarlo Dotto; Alberto Piccinini (2006). Il mucchio selvaggio. Mondadori. ISBN 88-04-53952-6.
