= Telebiella =

- Country: Italy
- Broadcast area: Italy

Programming
- Language: Italian
- Picture format: 16:9 SDTV

History
- Launched: 1971; 55 years ago

Telebiella is a television station, originally broadcast via cable, founded in 1971 by Giuseppe Sacchi, former RAI director, at a former boarding school located in downtown Biella. After Telediffusione Italiana Telenapoli it became the second local television station to infringe RAI's monopoly.

== History ==
=== Birth ===
Telebiella was born from an idea of the former RAI director Peppo Sacchi, who took advantage of a gap of the Royal Decree 27 February 1936, n. 645, which does not provide for the obtaining of television concessions for cable television in Italy; was registered in court on 20 April 1971 as a "video periodical newspaper".

On 6 April 1972, a message introducing Ivana Ramella, Sacchi's wife, was broadcast. The equipment used is quite amateur: with a portable video recorder the broadcaster broadcasts its daily news. Despite the focus on information, with news bulletins and talk shows, Telebiella also aired the first non-RAI "light" entertainment program, Campanile in tub. There are many enthusiasts of the sector who, after learning of the story, personally go to Biella; among these we remember Renzo Villa, founder of Telealtomilanese and then of Antennatre.

=== The 1970s and the political question ===
The issuing of the Presidential Decree of 29 March 1973, n. 156 which unifies all means of remote communication into a single category, however makes private networks illegal, including those that transmit via cable, and the Minister of Posts Giovanni Gioia ordered, with decree of 9 May 1973 («Gioia decree»), the deactivation of the Sacchi system, warning him to proceed within 10 days.

Telebiella then started a legal battle: Sacchi had himself reported for violating postal regulations (because they contravened the RAI monopoly). The story has prominence in the national newspapers: the case is further expanded when the magistrate Giuliano Girzi interrupts the proceedings against Sacchi, and as judge a quo raised doubts of unconstitutionality to the Constitutional Court. The Constitutional Court accepted most of Sacchi's reasons; in fact, with the sentence of 10 July 1974 n. 225 the constitutional illegitimacy of the articles is declared. 1, 183, and 195 of the Presidential Decree. of 1973 regarding cable broadcasting which reserved the television monopoly to the State. Subsequently, the RAI reform of 1975 authorizes single-channel cable transmissions as well as over-the-air retransmission on Italian territory of foreign networks (Antenne 2, TSI, Telemontecarlo and Koper-Capodistria)..

During the 1980s, it was part of Grupo Aiazzone Televisivo, of the Aiazzone group, which used it to advertise the store.

=== 1990s and name change ===
At the end of 1992, Corriere della Sera announced the bankruptcy of Telebiella. The latter was then auctioned and purchased in the spring of 1993 by Pirenei Srl from Previde Prato which, together with TeleRitmo e VideoNovara, manages the brand.

Some of its key personalities included:

- Enzo Tortora was a staunch supporter of the private Piedmontese television broadcaster to the point of becoming its vice-president.
- Ezio Greggio made his debut towards the end of the 70s on this station.
- Il cantautore Bruno Lauzi, who had already a long fame, took an active part in Telebiella's programming.
