= Parco del Roccolo =

Park in the northern part of the Po Valley, Italy

Coordinates: 45.539°N 8.919°E

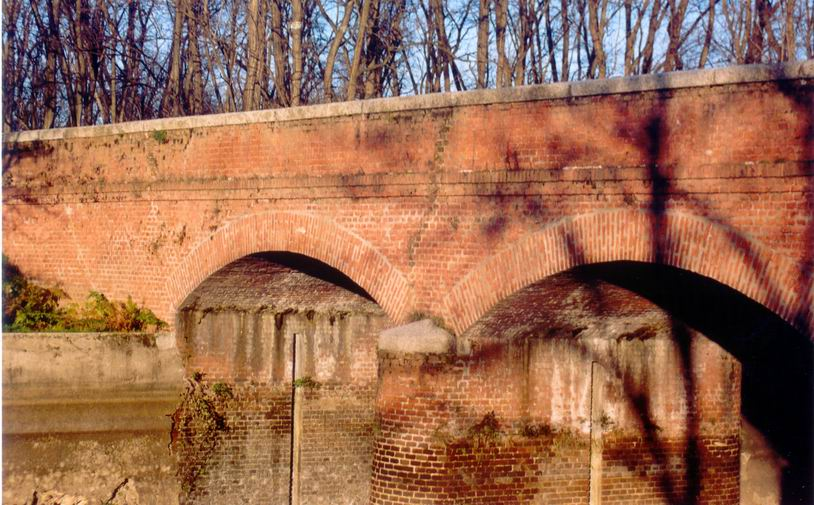
Bridge over the Villoresi Canal inside the Roccolo, Parabiago.

The Parco del Roccolo is a local park of interest to more than one municipality and it is located between the rivers Olona and Ticino in the northern part of the Po Valley, in a north-western area in the province of Milan, on the southern edge of the Altomilanese. The park includes wooded and agricultural areas in the municipalities of Arluno, Busto Garolfo, Canegrate, Casorezzo (where the park headquarters are located), Nerviano (since 1997) and Parabiago, with a surface of 1595 hectares (about 16 km^{2}).

The park takes its name from a technique once used in bird trapping, now considered illegal, the Roccolo: an oval clearing in which stood a three-storey tower camouflaged among the vegetation.

It was established in 1991 for the safeguard of the natural elements of the area and for the enhancement of agriculture, which involves about 80% of the surface of the park, with the cultivation of corn, wheat, oats, barley, soybeans and fodder.

Of the remaining land area, 9% is characterized by forests, while 1% by roads, quarries and the Villoresi canal with its network of secondary irrigation canals. Another characteristic of the park is the presence of numerous farmhouses scattered throughout its territory, witnesses to the historical agricultural past of the area.

Recognized in 1994 as an agricultural park of supra-municipal interest by the Lombardy Region, it is currently being extended to the WWF Oasis of the Vanzago woods.

== History ==
The Roccolo Park was born from the debris transported by the Olona and Ticino rivers from the alpine valleys. 15,000 years ago during the last phase of the glaciation, the temperature rose creating a colony of birch and conifer forests.

The postglacial period is distinguished by the presence of broadleaf trees interrupted by streams. Later, our ancestors began to modify the landscape thanks to agro-pastoral activity in the Po Valley.

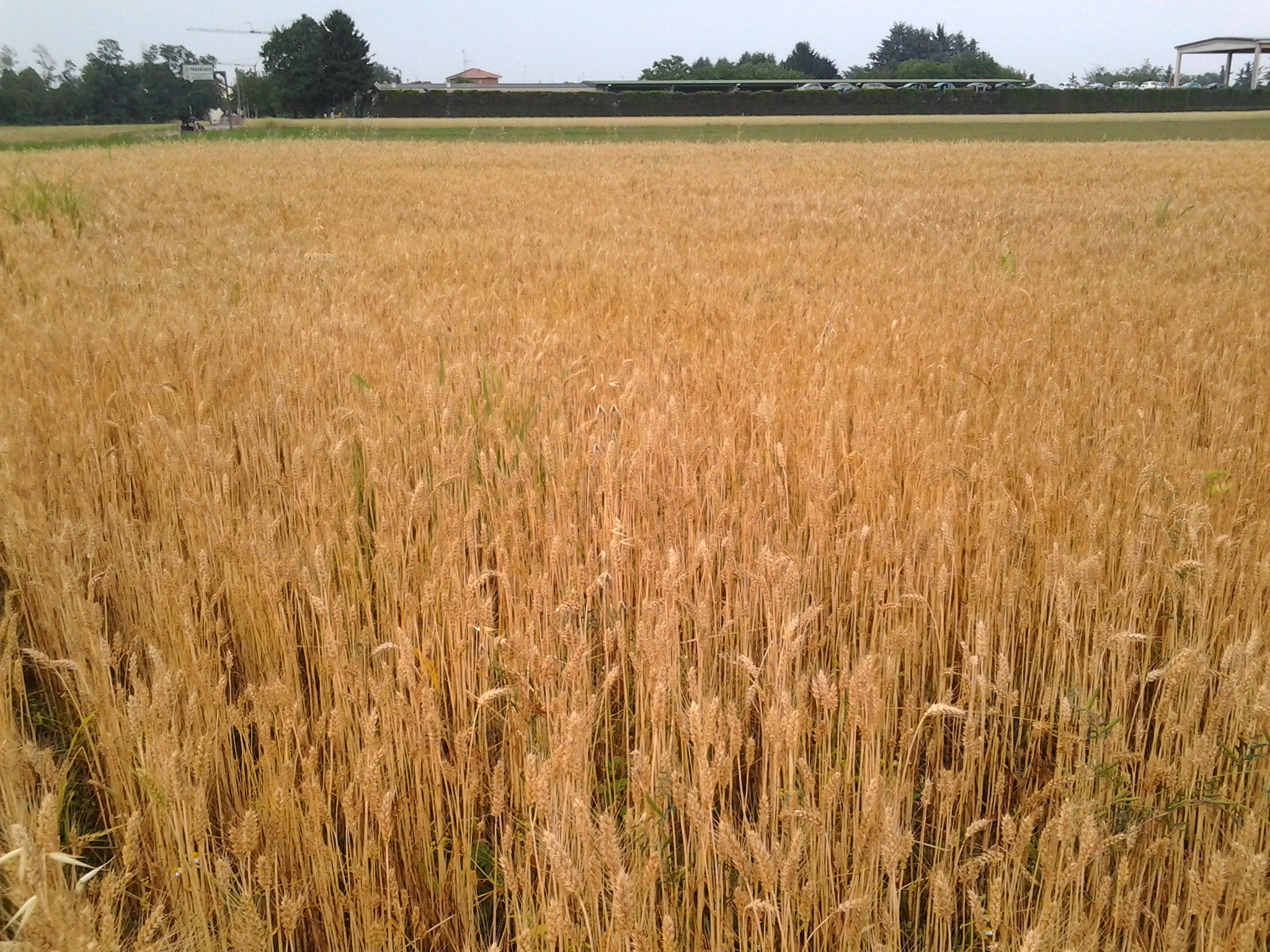
Corn in the Roccolo Park

== Habitat ==
=== Agricoltural fields ===
As already mentioned, the cultivated areas constitute the majority of the park's territory. Among the elements that make up the flora of this type of environment, in addition to the cultivated species, you can find cornflower, chamomile and poppy. As for the animal species present, there are foxes, hares, pheasants, hedgehogs, thrushes, larks and voles.

=== Wooded areas ===
The second living element of the Roccolo is the bush. The wooded flora is represented by plants existing in the area for the most part only since the 19th century: ailanthus, robinia, late cherry and red oak. Only in the Woods of Arluno and Brughierezza (between Casorezzo and Busto Garolfo), you can still admire plants native to the Po Valley such as oak, lily of the valley, Solomon's seal and periwinkle. These areas are the natural habitat of shrews, dormouse, reddish voles, owls, tawny owls, sparrowhawks and woodpeckers.

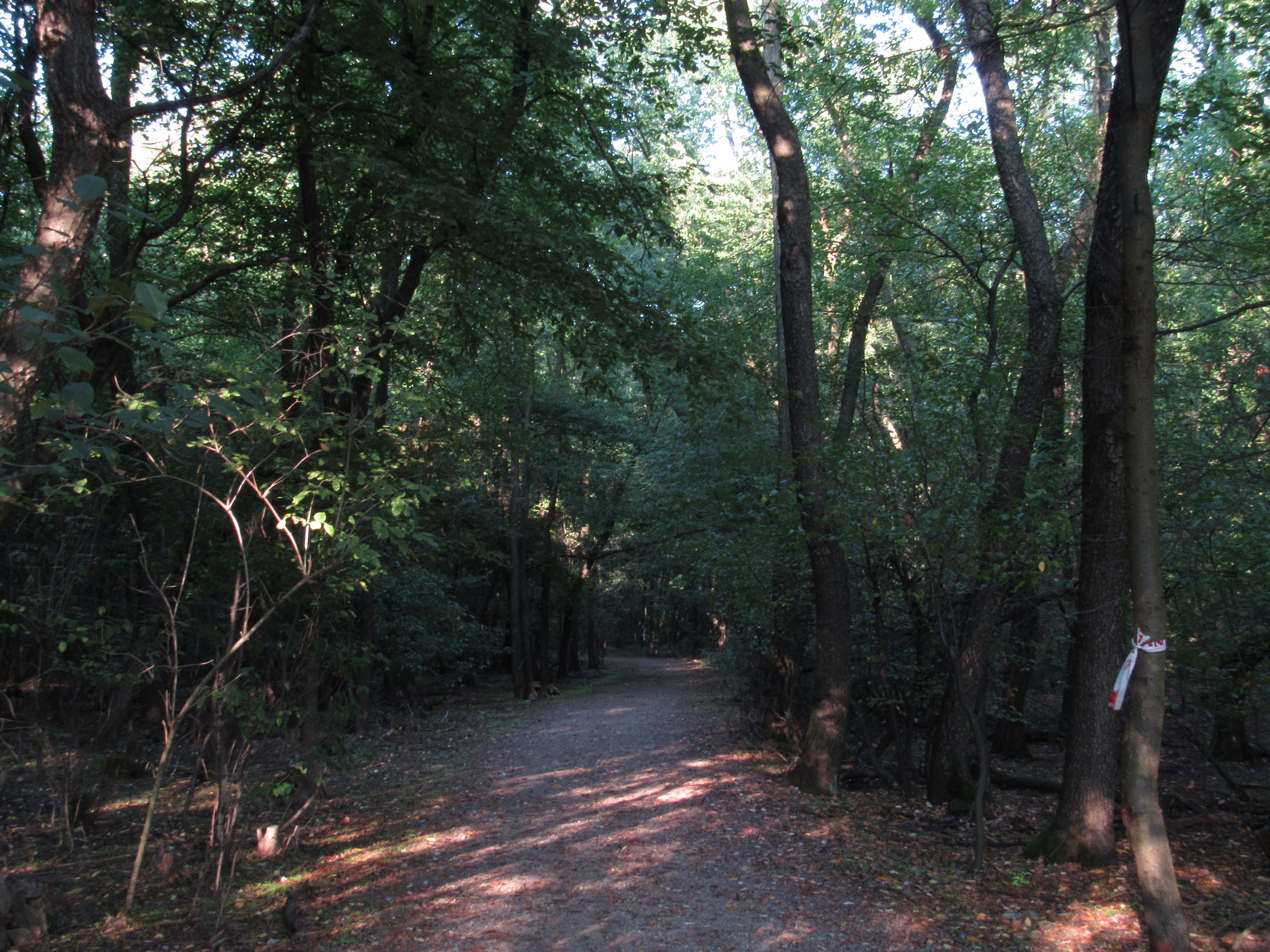
Woods within the Roccolo Park

=== Hedges ===
To "mark the border" between agricultural fields and woods, are the hedges. The living species that inhabit this intermediate area are the lizard, the slowworm, the green whip snake, the weasel, the dormouse, the kestrel, the owl, the red-backed shrike, the wryneck, and the turtledove, which find their primary source of nourishment among the shrubs: fruits and insects.

=== Irrigation canals and quarries ===
In the park there are no watercourses or natural ponds, the Villoresi canal with its irrigation network and its secondary ones, such as the Corbetta canal that for example originates from the four mouths of Busto Garolfo, represents the major water resource; while the only ponds present are the artificial lakes originated from the quarries. They are a food source and breeding ground for birds including heron, mallard, moorhen, bittern, water rail and reed bunting; there are also reptiles (grass snakes, amphibians (edible frogs and green toads), fish and insects. At the edges of the Villoresi and its secondary canals, there are small maintenance roads, which in some parts have been used as cycle paths and are renamed blue roads.

== Insects present in the Roccolo Park ==
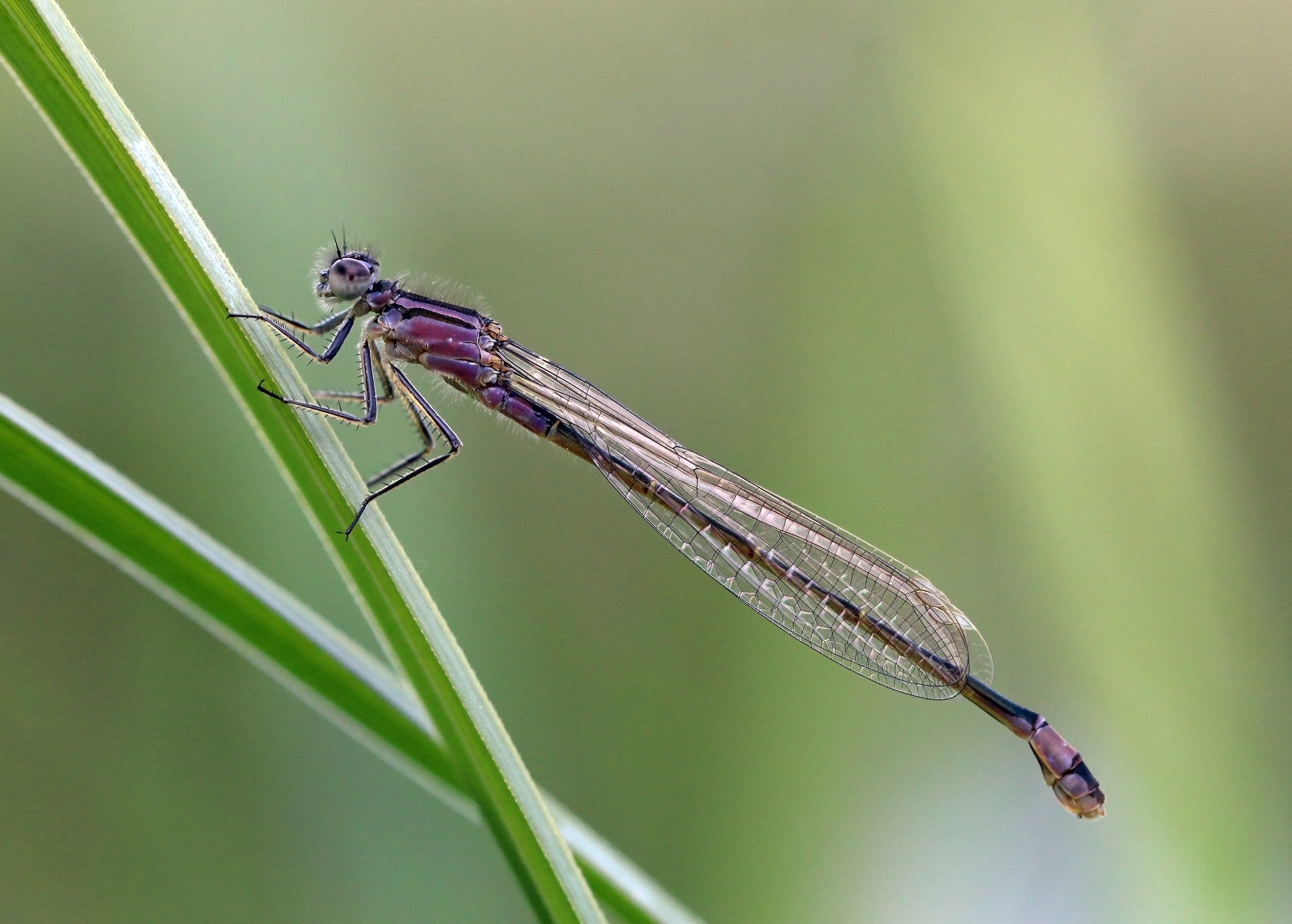
Blue-tailed damselfly (Ischnura elegans) teneral female violacea

- Dragonflies: Odonates divided in: Zygoptera and Anisoptera.
1. The Zygoptera have a slender constitution, a large head, wide-spaced eyes, narrow wings. During the flight they hunt waiting for their prey.
2. The Anisoptera are more robust, have round head, eyes close together and the hind wings are wider than the front ones.

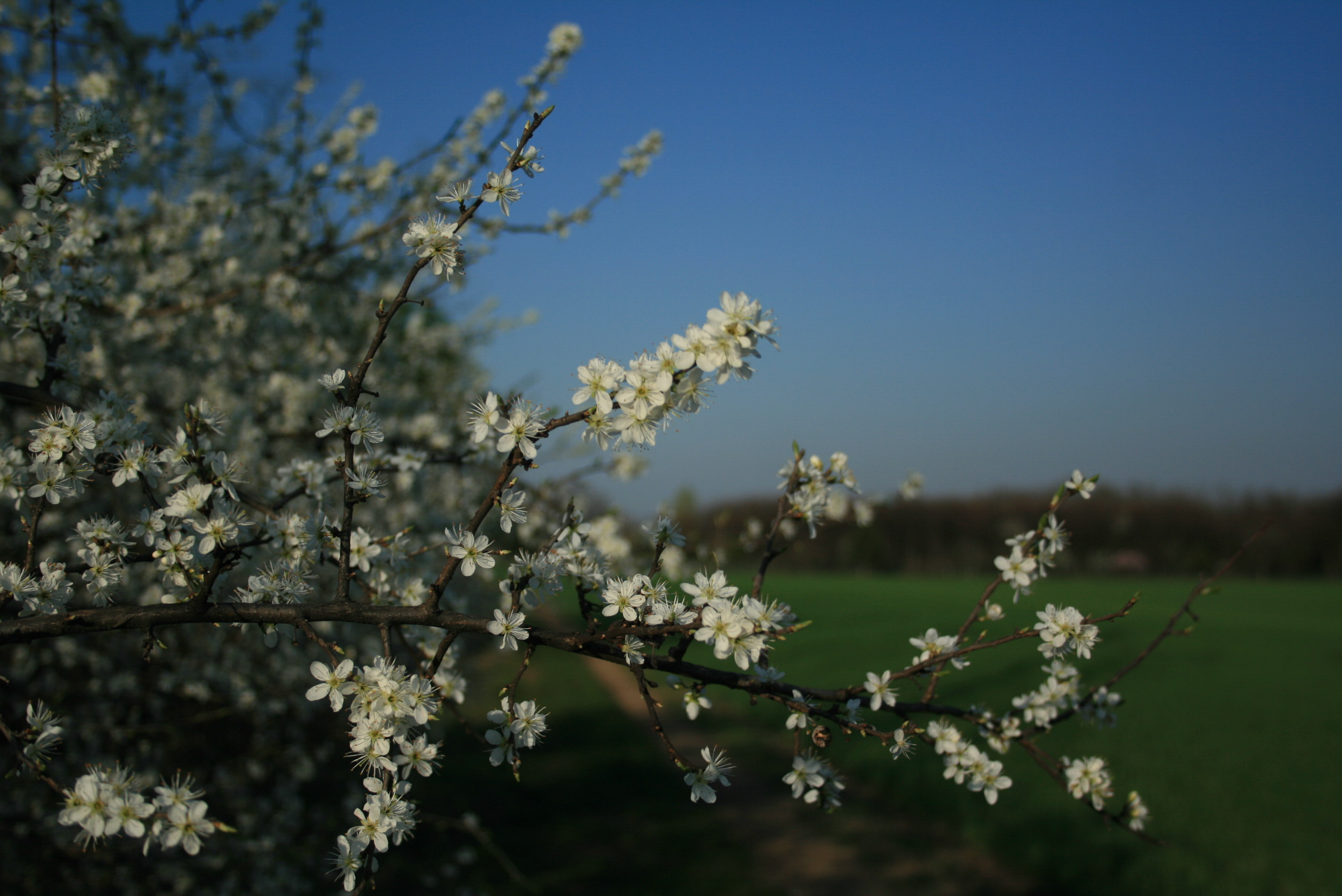
Flora of the Roccolo Park

== Flora of the Roccolo Park ==
The park area includes:

- 234 plant species belonging to 70 different families.

- Out of 180 species, 9 species are protected by the territory of Lombardy: Wood Anemone, Woodland Strawberry, Lily of the Valley, Biennial Bellflower, Wild Bellflower, Butcher's Broom, Narcissus, Yellow iris, Mazzasorda.

There are some areas with a particular faunistic value, for example the woods of Arluno, Brughierezza, Busto Garolfo and Parabiago. They have the highest richness of the park with 168, 160 and 152 species respectively.

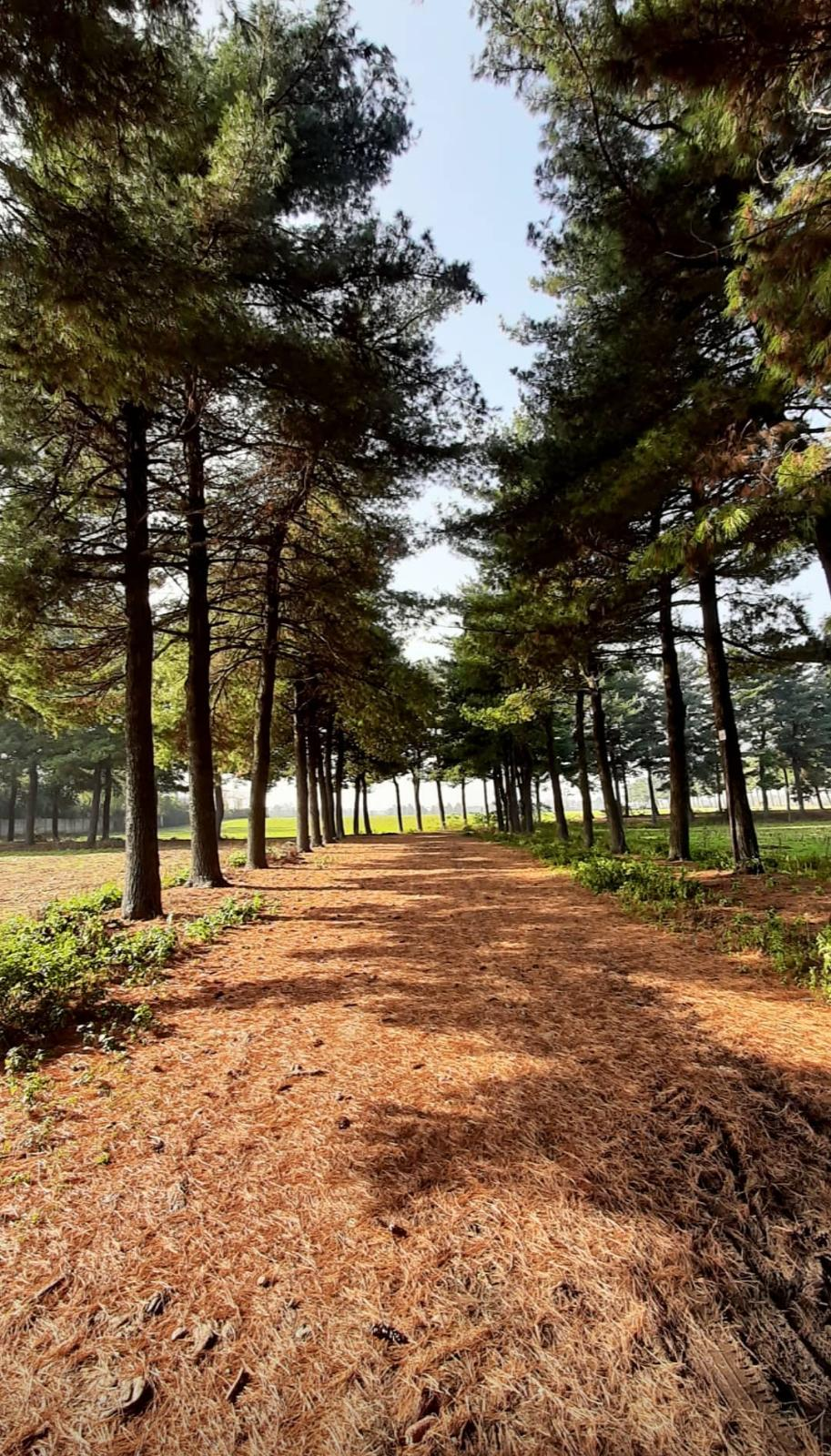
Parco del Roccolo, Busto Garolfo.
