= Wanna Marchi =

Italian television personality, scammer and criminal (born 1942)

Wanna Marchi, born Vanna (Castel Guelfo di Bologna, 2 September 1942), is an Italian television personality, scammer and criminal.

Very popular in the eighties and nineties, she earned the nickname "queen of teleshopping", and was later found responsible several times for scams connected to her business and sentenced to various prison terms of varying lengths.

== Biography ==
=== Early years ===
Born in Castel Guelfo di Bologna on 2 September 1942 into a peasant family, she is the eldest daughter of Enedina Brini (1914-1993) and Nino Marchi (1912-1957). Following the death of her father on Christmas Day 1957, she began working as a beautician in Ozzano dell'Emilia.

=== Career as a teleseller ===
She became known when she started working in radio; subsequently she made her television debut with the television program Gran Bazar, hosted by Raffaele Pisu and Marisa Del Frate. Between the end of the seventies and the early eighties, Wanna Marchi became noticed for the noisy telesales of slimming products based on micronized dandelion and algae extracts, with which, thanks also to her particular communication style, she had a certain success.

Starting in 1983, she hosted a program entirely dedicated to the products she sponsored, Wanna Marchi Show, broadcast in the late evening on Rete A and hosted together with her children Maurizio and Stefania Nobile. During teleshopping, she used a high, shrill tone of voice and direct, effective phrases, often containing insults, together with flashy and incisive gestures: a style that made her unmistakable, so much so that she was nicknamed the "queen of teleshopping" and "telesalesperson". Her key characteristic which remained in Italian collective imagination is the phrase he shouted repeatedly to seek the assent of viewers: "D'accordo?!" ("Agree?!").

One of the best-selling products was the "belly melter" cream, of which the salesperson illustrated miraculous slimming properties. The cost "on offer" was, in the eighties, 100,000 lire for three packs. Marchi, riding the wave of the success of her motto, in 1989 recorded, as Wanna Marchi & The Pommodores, a 7" and 12" single, entitled D'accordo?!: the song, an ensemble of more or less repeated phrases from the teleseller accompanied by a typically 1980s synthpop base played by the group The Pommodores (name referencing The Commodores), achieved a fair amount of notoriety thanks also to its passage in the program television Superclassifica Show. The song and the video are among the examples of trash production on television in the 1980s.

Thanks to her popularity, in 1990 Wanna Marchi was hired as a minor actress in the parody I promessi sposi, a dramatized by the comedy trio Lopez, Marchesini, Solenghi, where she played a barker who sells products to cure the plague. In 1998 he starred in Alfredo Arciero's film Dio c'è, alongside Riccardo Rossi and Chiara Noschese.

In the spring of 2004, during the legal proceedings, Wanna Marchi and her daughter returned to the air with a daily strip, not of teleshopping but of current affairs talk shows, entitled Tremate tremate, the witches are back on the local station TV7 Lombardia.

=== Return to media ===
On 25 March 2014 Wanna Marchi and her daughter were guests on the radio show La Zanzara hosted by Giuseppe Cruciani and co-hosted by David Parenzo on Radio 24.

Nel novembre e dicembre del 2015 torna in video assieme alla figlia Stefania Nobile conducendo il programma Ora parlo io sul canale iTV Italia. Il 6 ottobre 2016 è la protagonista della prima puntata de L'intervista, programma condotto da Maurizio Costanzo su Canale 5. In January 2017, her participation inL'isola dei famosi, alongside her daughter, caused a stir. Due to the controversy that arose in this regard, Mediaset decided not to confirm their presence in the cast of the reality show. From December of the same year, together with his daughter Stefania, he should have held a training course for aspiring salespeople at the Paritari Volta institute in Bari, but given the controversy the school took a step back.

In the spring of 2018, together with her daughter, she was the protagonist of the RTB Network program Le grandi Sorelle, where she followed and commented live on the episodes of the fifteenth edition of Grande Fratello. On 29 September 2021, she returned to television, taking part together with his daughter in a 100-hour marathon of live television, broadcast by the digital channel GO-TV. For the same network, from 15 November 2021 she will support her daughter in the program she hosted and created #noicreiamodipendenza, broadcast on Mondays from 10pm for eight consecutive hours of live broadcast.

In September 2022, a four-episode documentary dedicated to the life of Wanna Marchi entitled Wanna was broadcast on Netflix, which was also nominated for the Nastri d'argento as best documentary in 2023.

== Lawsuits ==
=== Bankruptcy of "Wanna Marchi" (1990-) ===
In 1990, Wanna Marchi was arrested and then sentenced to 1 year and 11 months in prison for complicity in fraudulent bankruptcy due to the bankruptcy of the "Wanna Marchi" company registered in her name, through which she sold cosmetic products. In 1994, she returned to selling on television together with her daughter Stefania, on various local private stations, thanks also to the political and financial support of the self-proclaimed Marquis rag. Attilio Capra de Carrè.

== Sources ==
- Grasso, Aldo, ed. (2008). Enciclopedia della televisione (in Italian) (3rd ed.). Garzanti Editore. ISBN 978-88-11-50526-6.
