= Tollegno =

- Comune
- Comune di Tollegno
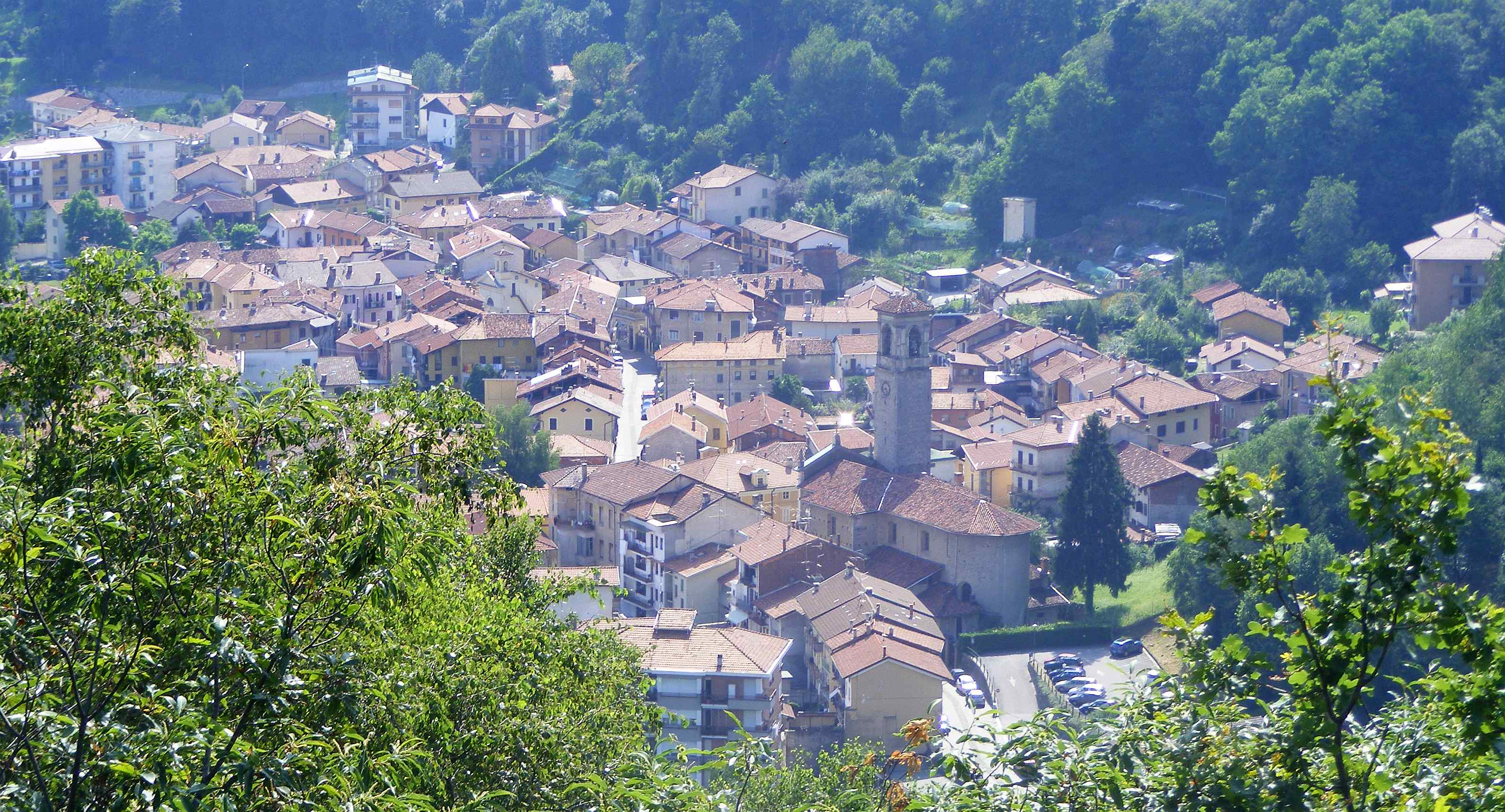
- View of Tollegno

- Location within Italy Location within Piedmont
- Coordinates: 45°35′N 8°3′E
- Country: Italy
- Region: Piedmont
- Province: Province of Biella (BI)

Area
  - Total: 3.4 km^{2} (1.3 sq mi)
- Elevation: 495 m (1,624 ft)

Population (Dec. 2004)
  - Total: 2,678
  - Density: 790/km^{2} (2,000/sq mi)
- Time zone: UTC+1 (CET)
  - Summer (DST): UTC+2 (CEST)
- Postal code: 13818
- Dialing code: 015
- Website: Official website

Tollegno is a comune (municipality) in the Province of Biella in the Italian region Piedmont, located about 60 kilometres (37 mi) northeast of Turin and about 2 kilometres (1 mi) northwest of Biella. As of 31 December 2004, it had a population of 2,678 and an area of 3.4 square kilometres (1.3 mi^{2}).

Tollegno borders the following municipalities: Andorno Micca, Biella, Pralungo, Sagliano Micca.

== Demographic evolution ==
Historical population

Year	Pop.	±%
1861	949	—
1871	1,032	+8.7%
1881	1,224	+18.6%
1901	1,493	+22.0%
1911	1,623	+8.7%
1921	1,697	+4.6%

Year	Pop.	±%
1931	2,675	+57.6%
1936	2,792	+4.4%
1951	3,061	+9.6%
1961	3,175	+3.7%
1971	3,260	+2.7%
1981	3,120	−4.3%

Year	Pop.	±%
1991	2,928	−6.2%
2001	2,679	−8.5%
2011	2,645	−1.3%
2021	2,383	−9.9%

Source: Data from ISTAT
