= Colma di Mombarone =

Mountain in Italy

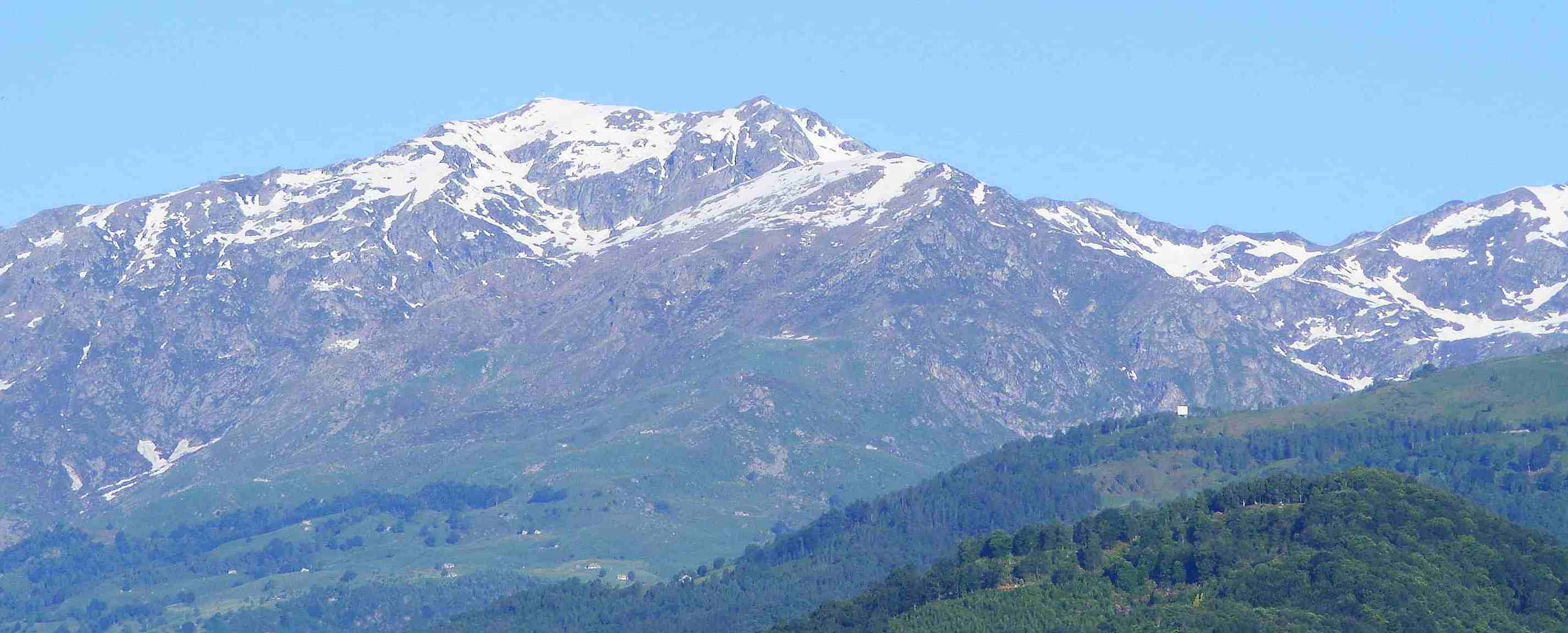
- View from Pavignano.

Highest point
- Elevation: 2,371 m (7,779 ft)
- Prominence: 250 m (820 ft)
- Coordinates: 45°35′10″N 7°53′35″E

Geography
- Location within Alps
- Location: Province of Turin / Province of Biella, Italy
- Parent range: Alpi Biellesi

Climbing
- Easiest route: From San Giacomo di Andrate or San Carlo di Graglia

Colma di Mombarone (or simply Mombarone) is a mountain of the Biellese Alps, a sub-range of Pennine Alps, in northern Italy. It visually marks, along with Mount Cavallaria on the opposite side, the entrance of the Aosta Valley from the Po plain. In 1900, a huge statue of Jesus Christ, still located there, was built on the top.

== Etymology ==
The name comes from the Piedmontese language: Colma is a term used in the northern Piedmont to refer to a pass or a high place, while Mombarone is the italianisation of the piedmontese Monbaron, where mon means mount and baron means heap or pile.

== Geography ==
The mountain is located between the Dora Baltea and Cervo valleys, on the border between the Province of Turin and the province of Biella, both in Piemonte region. Administratively it is divided between the comunes of Settimo Vittone (in the province of Turin), Donato and Graglia (both in the province of Biella).

=== SOIUSA classification ===
According to the SOIUSA (International Standardized Mountain Subdivision of the Alps) the mountain can be classified in the following way:

- main part = Western Alps
- major sector = North Western Alps
- section = Pennine Alps
- subsection = Southern Valsesia Alps
- supergroup = Alpi Biellesi
- group = Catena Tre Vescovi - Mars
- subgroup =
- code = I/B-9.IV-A.1

== Access to the summit ==
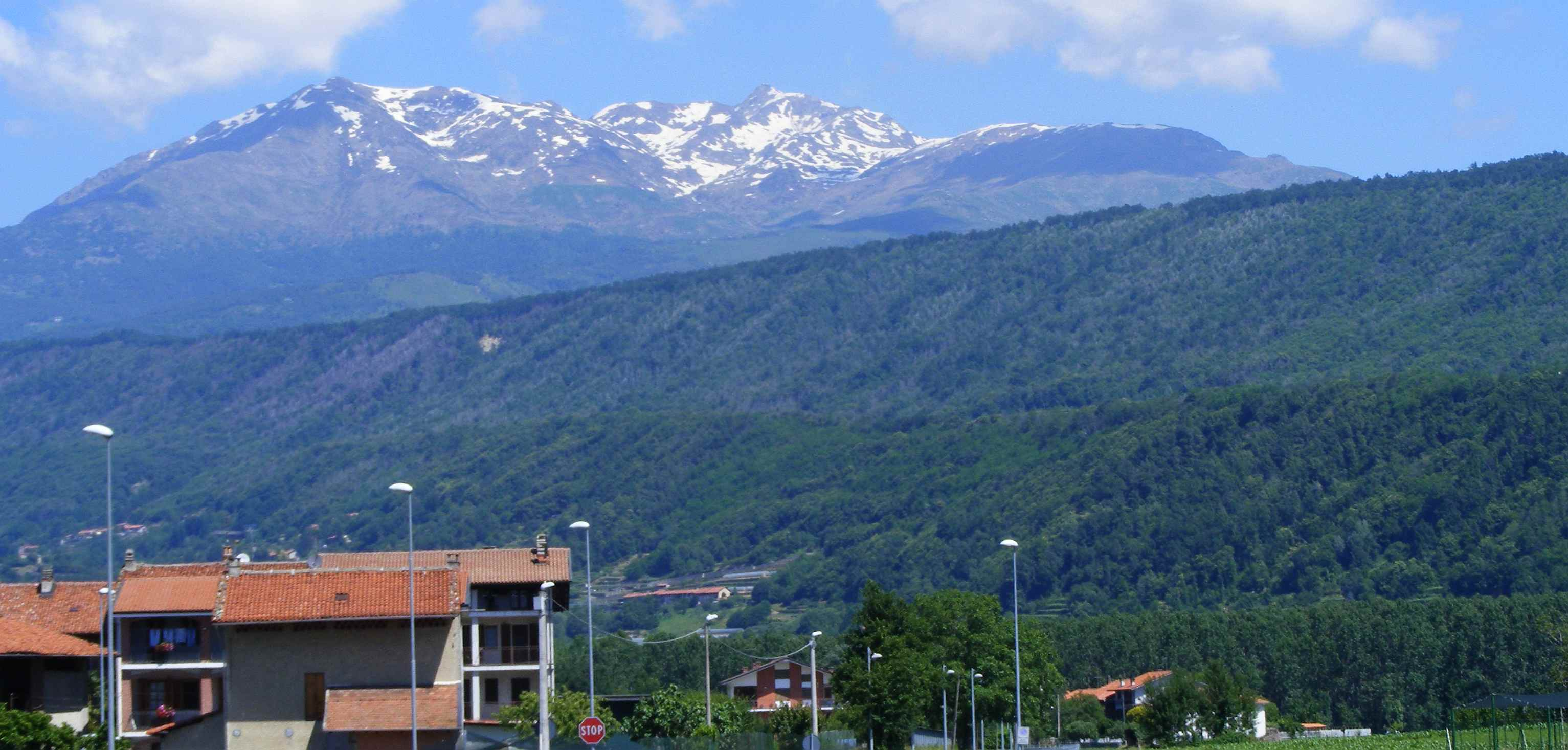
View from Bollengo.

The easiest routes to the summit are two long but well marked footpaths, one starting from San Giacomo di Andrate (TO) and another from San Carlo di Graglia (BI); both of them converge on the southern ridge of the mountain. Near the mountain's summit, at 2,312 m, there is a permanent mountain hut, the Rifugio Mombarone.

== Maps ==
- Italian official cartography (Istituto Geografico Militare - IGM); on-line version: www.pcn.minambiente.it
- Provincia di Biella cartography: Carta dei sentieri della Provincia di Biella, 1:25.00 scale, 2004; on line version: webgis.provincia.biella.it
