= Occhieppo =

Occhieppo may refer to the following places in the Province of Biella, Piedmont, Italy:

- Occhieppo Inferiore
- Occhieppo Superiore
