= Mongrando =

- Comune
- Comune di Mongrando
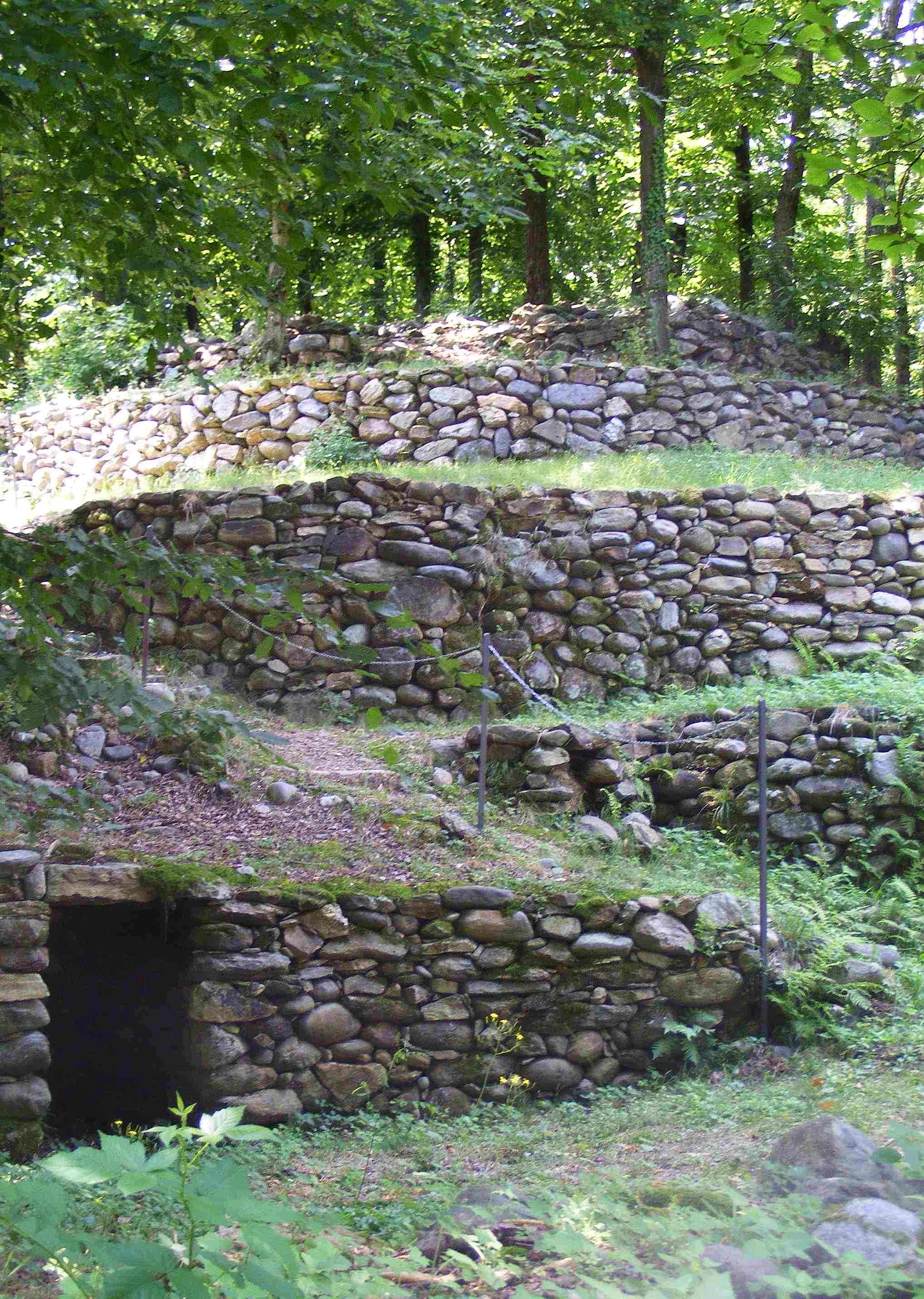
- The Castelliere of Mongrando.

- Coat of arms

- Location within Italy Location within Piedmont
- Coordinates: 45°31′N 8°0′E
- Country: Italy
- Region: Piedmont
- Province: Biella (BI)
- Frazioni: Aral Grande, Borgo-San Lorenzo, Ceresane, Ceresane-Curanuova, Curanuova, Granero, Graziano-Ruta, La Tana, Le Vignazze, Maghetto, Minazia, San Michele, Toso

Government
  - Mayor: Antonio Filoni

Area
  - Total: 16.7 km^{2} (6.4 sq mi)
- Elevation: 355 m (1,165 ft)

Population (31 October 2017)
  - Total: 3,805
  - Density: 228/km^{2} (590/sq mi)
- Demonym: Mongrandesi
- Time zone: UTC+1 (CET)
  - Summer (DST): UTC+2 (CEST)
- Postal code: 13888
- Dialing code: 015
- Patron saint: Madonna del Carmine
- Website: Official website

Mongrando is a comune (municipality) in the Province of Biella in the Italian region Piedmont, located about 60 kilometres (37 mi) northeast of Turin and about 8 kilometres (5 mi) southwest of Biella.

Mongrando borders the following municipalities: Borriana, Camburzano, Donato, Graglia, Netro, Occhieppo Inferiore, Ponderano, Sala Biellese, Zubiena. The communal territory is crossed by the Elvo torrent.

Italian-Brazilian filmmaker Vittorio Capellaro was born in Mongrando in 1877.
