= Borriana =

Borriana could refer to:

- Borriana, Castellón, city on the Valencian Community, Spain
- Borriana, Piedmont, commune on the Piedmont, Italy.
