= Sordevolo =

- Comune
- Comune di Sordevolo
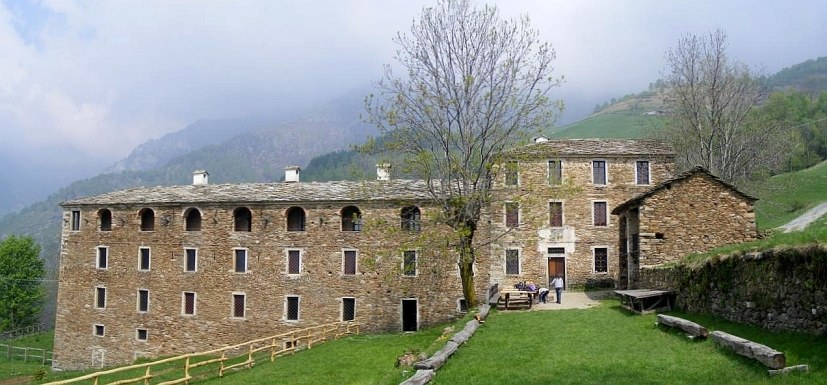
- Trappist monastery of Sordevolo.

- Coat of arms

- Location within Italy Location within Piedmont
- Coordinates: 45°34′N 7°59′E
- Country: Italy
- Region: Piedmont
- Province: Biella (BI)

Government
  - Mayor: Alberto Monticone

Area
  - Total: 13.8 km^{2} (5.3 sq mi)
- Elevation: 627 m (2,057 ft)

Population (31 December 2010)
  - Total: 1,334
  - Density: 96.7/km^{2} (250/sq mi)
- Demonym: Sordevolesi
- Time zone: UTC+1 (CET)
  - Summer (DST): UTC+2 (CEST)
- Postal code: 13817
- Dialing code: 015

Sordevolo is a comune (municipality) in the Province of Biella in the Italian region Piedmont, located about 60 kilometres (37 mi) northeast of Turin and about 7 kilometres (4 mi) west of Biella.

Sordevolo borders the following municipalities: Biella, Graglia, Muzzano, Occhieppo Superiore, Pollone, Lillianes. The village is located in the Elvo Valley, a natural land at the foot of the Alps, in the middle of a religious and cultural area. Sordevolo can be considered a place of faith and popular devotion, whose widest expressions are the seven churches (and up to the last century three brotherhoods, too), and the Passion Play, while in the past were the Last Judgement Play in the 19th century and St. Augustine drama, were performed in 1777. Sordevolo is also historically bound to the textile industry that influenced the life of the village for centuries.

== La Passione ==
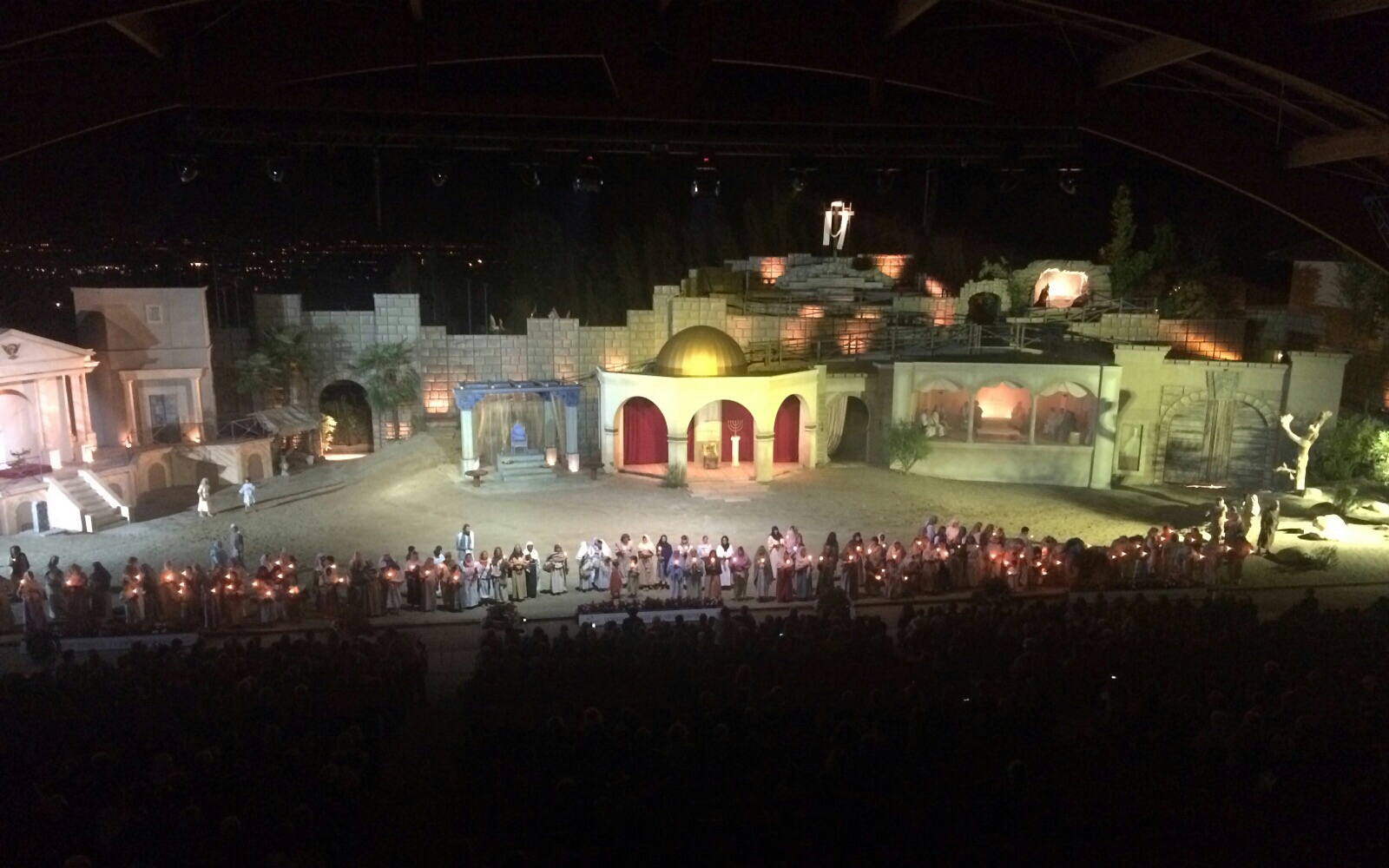
The set of the Passion Play 2015

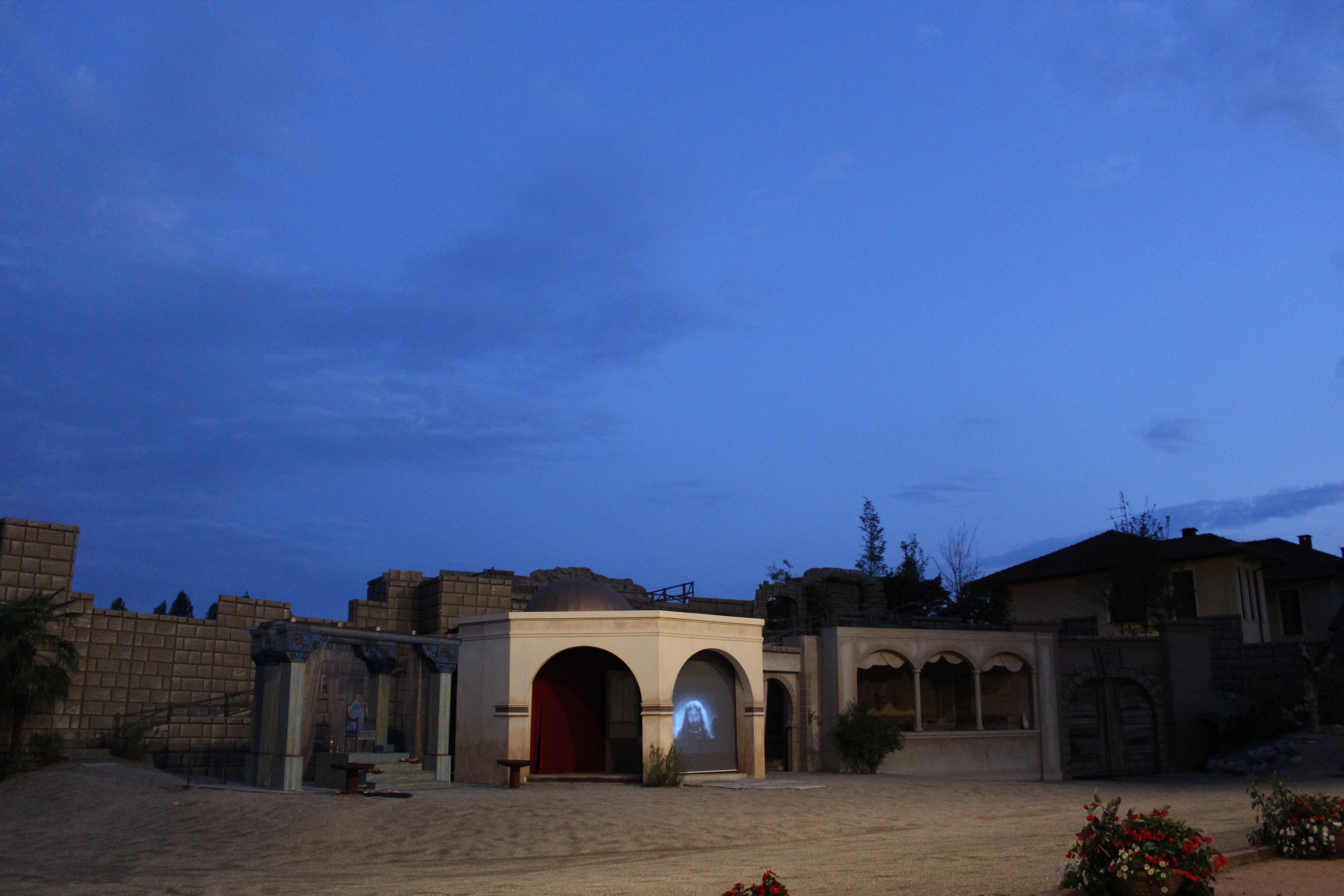
Sanhedrin and Last Supper room

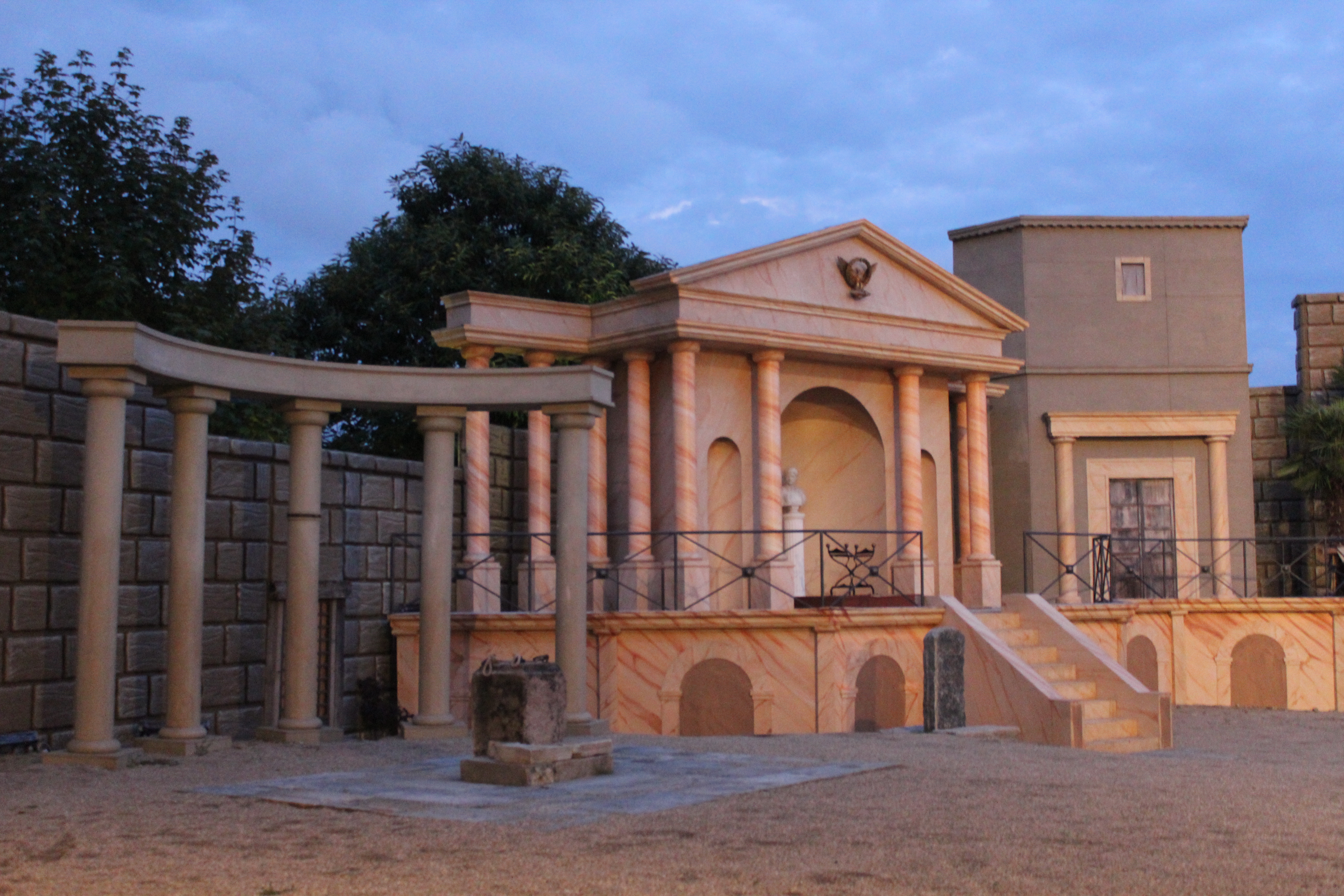
Pilate's Praetorium

La Passione (the Passion Play), organized by the Associazione Teatro Popolare di Sordevolo, is held every five years in the community of Sordevolo. The play has been performed since 1816 and features approximately 400 actors and 300 crew members. Over 100 days, forty shows are performed.

The script is a text in verses written by Giuliano Dati, chaplain of the church of the Forty Saints Martyrs in Trastevere, Rome, at the end of the 15th century. In 1539, during the Reformation, Pope Paul III banned the play. A copy of the original Roman manuscript printed in Turin in 1728 is now exhibited and preserved in the Museum of the Passion inside the Church of Santa Marta in Sordevolo.
