= Netro, Piedmont =

Netro
- Comune
- Comune di Netro
- Location within Italy Location within Piedmont
- Coordinates: 45°32′N 7°56′E
- Country: Italy
- Region: Piedmont
- Province: Province of Biella (BI)
- Frazioni: Castellazzo, Colla di Netro

Area
  - Total: 12.6 km^{2} (4.9 sq mi)
- Elevation: 606 m (1,988 ft)

Population (Dec. 2004)
  - Total: 1,010
  - Density: 80.2/km^{2} (208/sq mi)
- Demonym: Netresi
- Time zone: UTC+1 (CET)
  - Summer (DST): UTC+2 (CEST)
- Postal code: 13896
- Dialing code: 015

Netro is a comune (municipality) in the Province of Biella in the Italian region Piedmont, located about 110 kilometres (68 mi) northeast of Turin and about 10 kilometres (6.2 mi) southwest of Biella. As of 31 December 2004, it had a population of 1,010 and an area of 12.6 square kilometres (4.9 mi^{2}).

The municipality of Netro contains the frazioni (subdivisions, mainly villages and hamlets) Castellazzo and Colla di Netro.

Netro borders the following municipalities: Donato, Graglia, Mongrando.

== Demographic evolution ==
Historical population

Year	Pop.	±%
1861	2,203	—
1871	2,257	+2.5%
1881	2,260	+0.1%
1901	2,334	+3.3%
1911	2,444	+4.7%

Year	Pop.	±%
1921	2,276	−6.9%
1931	1,781	−21.7%
1936	1,703	−4.4%
1951	1,658	−2.6%
1961	1,517	−8.5%

Year	Pop.	±%
1971	1,275	−16.0%
1981	1,140	−10.6%
1991	989	−13.2%
2001	1,018	+2.9%

Source: Data from ISTAT
