= Muzzano =

Muzzano may refer to:

== Places ==
Italy

- Muzzano, Piedmont, a comune in the Province of Biella

Switzerland

- Muzzano, Switzerland, a comune in the Canton of Ticino
