= San Bartolomeo, Nomaglio =

San Bartolomeo
- Chiesa di San Bartolomeo (Italian)
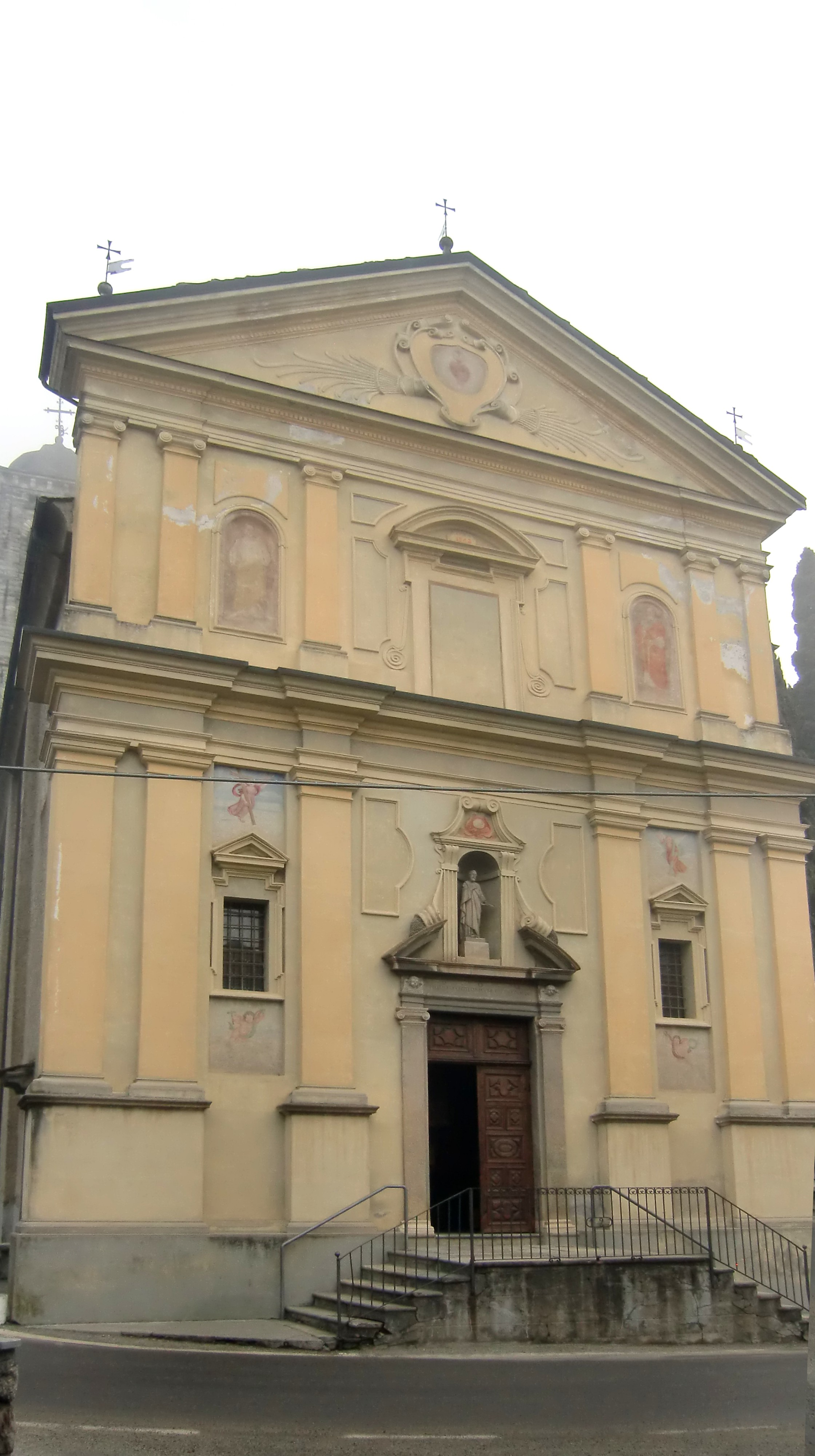
- San Bartolomeo, Nomaglio in 2011
- Click on the map for a fullscreen view
- 45°32′08.81″N 7°51′34.46″E
- Location: Nomaglio
- Country: Italy
- Denomination: Roman Catholic

Architecture
- Functional status: Active

Administration
- Diocese: Diocese of Ivrea

San Bartolomeo is a Roman Catholic church located in Nomaglio, Italy.

== History ==
The church was built in the Baroque style around 1690 on the foundations of an earlier place of worship.

== Description ==
The church has a single-nave layout and is flanked by a slender stone bell tower. Inside, it preserves four marble altars and one faux-marble stucco altar, along with marble flooring and stained-glass windows. The symmetrical façade features two frescoes depicting Saints Peter and Paul, painted by Achille Paracchini in 1946, as well as a central niche housing a statue of Saint Bartholomew dating to around 1845.
