= Camburzano =

- Comune
- Comune di Camburzano
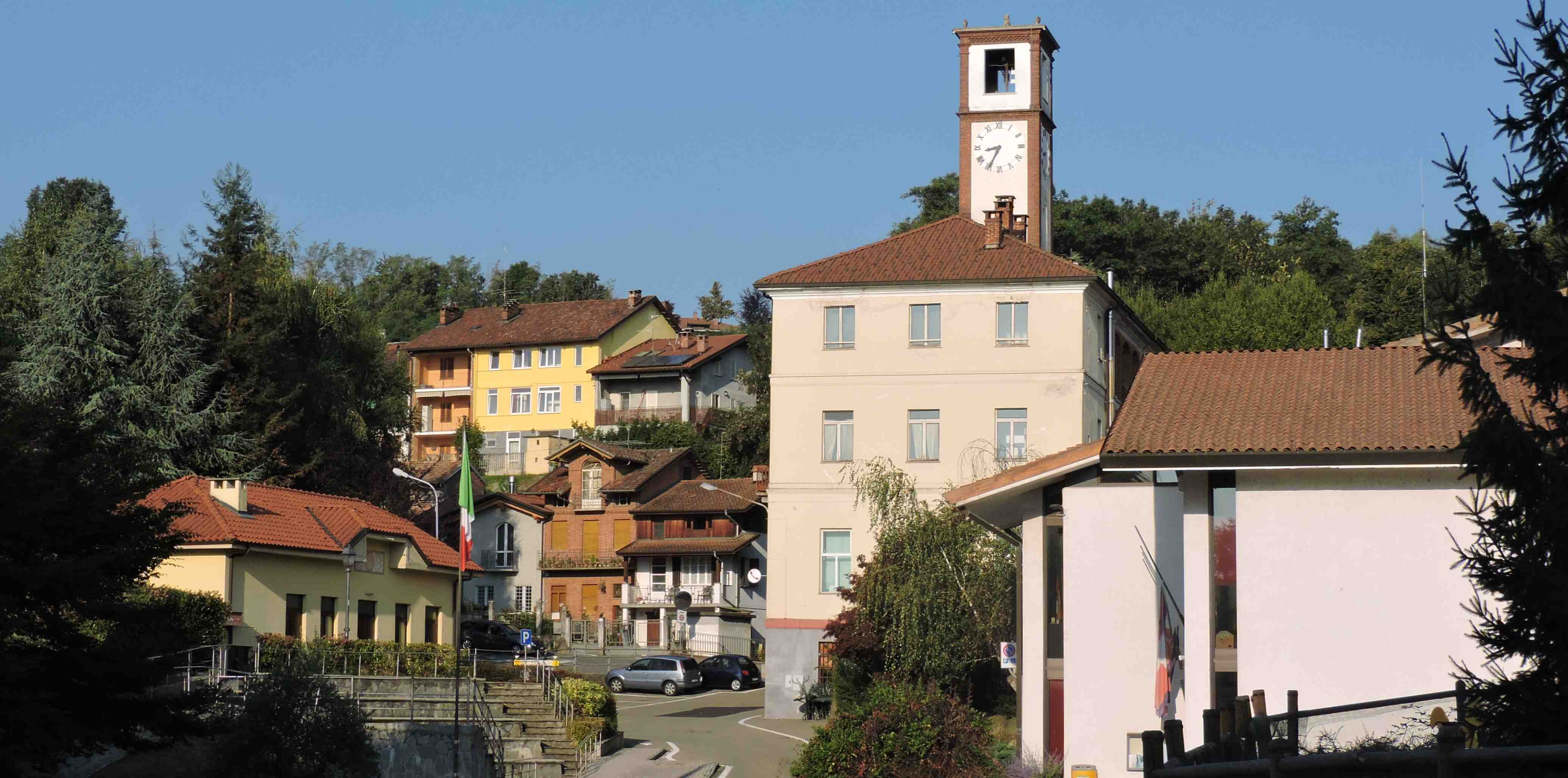
- View of Camburzano

- Location within Italy Location within Piedmont
- Coordinates: 45°33′N 7°59′E
- Country: Italy
- Region: Piedmont
- Province: Biella (BI)

Government
  - Mayor: Elena Pesole

Area
  - Total: 3.8 km^{2} (1.5 sq mi)
- Elevation: 420 m (1,380 ft)

Population (30 April 2017)
  - Total: 1,180
  - Density: 310/km^{2} (800/sq mi)
- Demonym: Camburzanesi
- Time zone: UTC+1 (CET)
  - Summer (DST): UTC+2 (CEST)
- Postal code: 13050
- Dialing code: 015
- Website: Official website

Camburzano is a comune (municipality) in the Province of Biella in the Italian region Piedmont, located about 60 kilometres (37 mi) northeast of Turin and about 7 kilometres (4 mi) southwest of Biella.

Camburzano borders the following municipalities: Graglia, Mongrando, Muzzano, Occhieppo Inferiore, Occhieppo Superiore.
