= Zubiena =

- Comune
- Comune di Zubiena
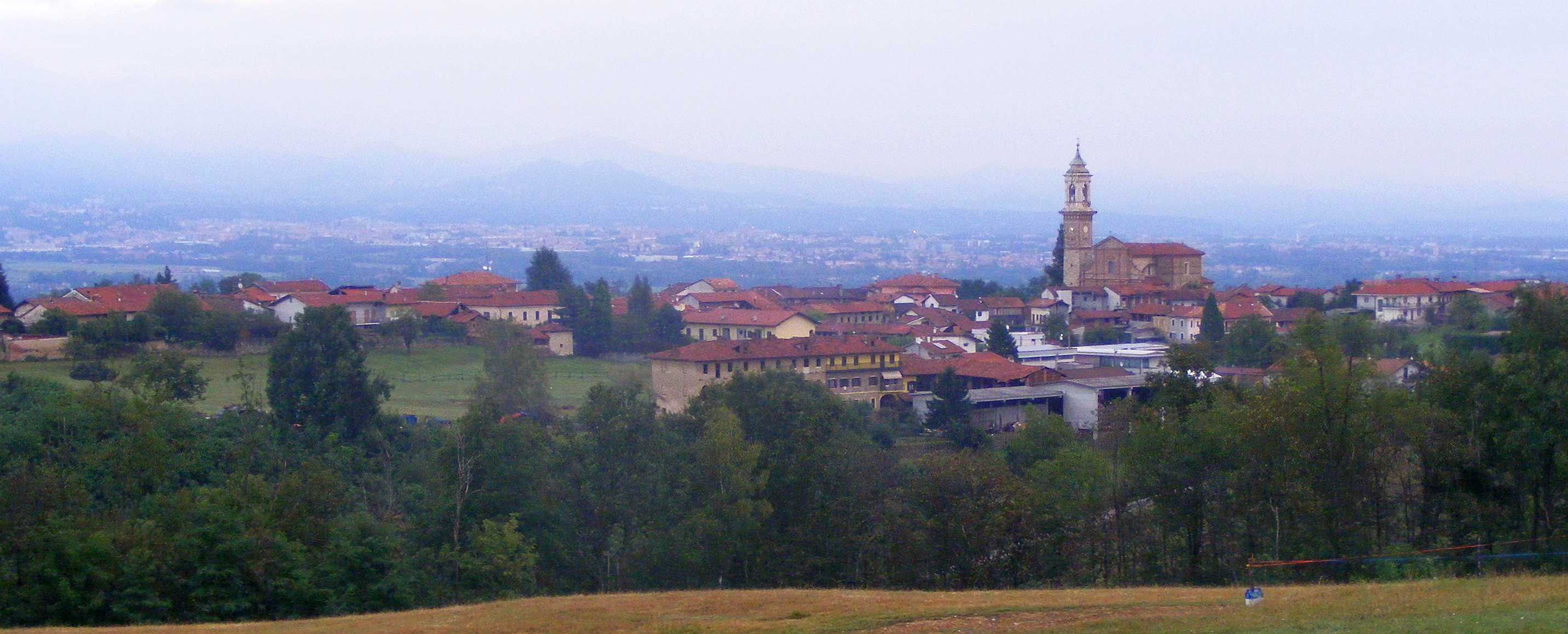
- View of Zubiena

- Coat of arms

- Location within Italy Location within Piedmont
- Coordinates: 45°29′N 7°57′E
- Country: Italy
- Region: Piedmont
- Province: Biella (BI)

Government
  - Mayor: Davide Basso

Area
  - Total: 12.6 km^{2} (4.9 sq mi)
- Elevation: 429 m (1,407 ft)

Population (31 December 2014)
  - Total: 1,226
  - Density: 97.3/km^{2} (252/sq mi)
- Demonym: Zubienesi
- Time zone: UTC+1 (CET)
  - Summer (DST): UTC+2 (CEST)
- Postal code: 13888
- Dialing code: 015
- Website: Official website

Zubiena is a comune (municipality) in the Province of Biella in the Italian region Piedmont, located about 50 kilometres (31 mi) northeast of Turin and about 13 kilometres (8 mi) southwest of Biella.

Zubiena borders the following municipalities: Borriana, Cerrione, Magnano, Mongrando, Sala Biellese, Torrazzo.
