= Farsuleia gens =

Plebeian family of ancient Rome

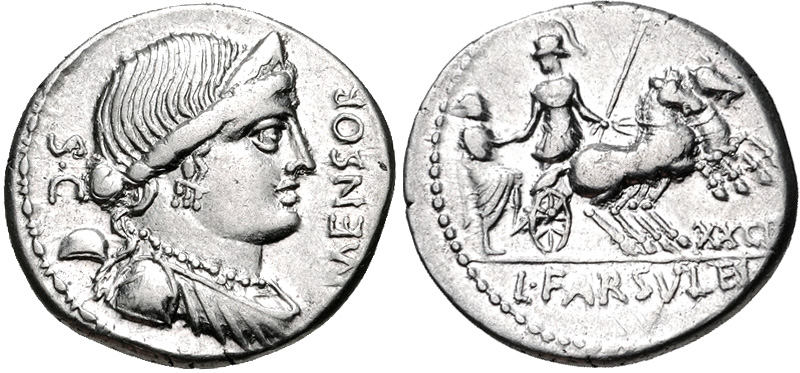
Denarius of Lucius Farsuleius Mensor, 75 BC. The obverse depicts Libertas and a pileus. On the reverse, Mars helps a man in a toga into a biga.

The gens Farsuleia was an obscure plebeian family at ancient Rome, known chiefly from coins and inscriptions, dating from the final decades of the Republic and imperial times. None of its members held any of the higher magistracies of the Roman state.

== Praenomina ==
For the most part, the Farsulei seem to have used common praenomina, such as Lucius, Quintus, and Gaius. However, one family living at Cerrione in Cisalpine Gaul used such exotic names as Niger, Primus, and Tertius; this seems to have been the habit of the country.

== Members ==
This list includes abbreviated praenomina. For an explanation of this practice, see filiation.

- Lucius Farsuleius Mensor, triumvir monetalis in 75 BC, known from a coin depicting Libertas and a pileus, perhaps alluding to the restoration of the powers of the tribunate that year. (Note: Eckhel suggested that this coin instead referred to the Lex Julia de Civitate Latinis et Sociis Danda of 90 BC, granting Roman citizenship to the allies, and perhaps alluding to the Farsulei obtaining the franchise. Crawford connects the surname Mensor, referring to a land surveyor, with the agrarian reforms advocated by the populares, who sought to add the new citizens to the electoral rolls.)
- Gaius Farsuleius Strabo, the son of Ptolomaïs, (Note: This inscription contains the unusual filiation "Ptolomaide natus", identifying the soldier's mother, rather than his father.) was a soldier in the third legion. He died at the age of twenty-five, having served four years, and was buried at Alexandria.
- Quintus Farsuleius Hesper, buried at Rome.
- Farsuleia, a freedwoman buried at Rome, together with Gaius Farsuleius Ctetus, a freedman.
- Gaius Farsuleius Ctetus, a freedman buried at Rome, together with Farsuleia, a freedwoman.
- Lucius Farsuleius Niceros Fuscus, buried at Rome, together with his sister, Theophila, and mother, Martha.
- Theophila Farsuleia, buried at Rome, together with her brother, Lucius, and mother, Martha.
- Lucius Farsuleius Cerdo, buried at Rome, together with his freedwoman, Thalassa.
- Quintus Farsuleius Philocalus, buried his son, Cleobus, at Rome, aged one year, eleven months, seven days.
- Quintus Farsuleius Capriolus, buried at Rome.
- Farsuleius Isidorus, mentioned in a funerary inscription from Rome.
- Quintus Farsuleius, named in a fragmentary inscription from Rome.
- Lucius Farsuleius Rufinus, the father of Marcellinus.
- Lucius Farsuleius L. f. Marcellinus, buried at Thubursicu Numidarum, in Africa Proconsularis, with his wife, Gellia.
- Farsuleius, buried at Castellum Arsacalitanum, in Numidia, aged forty.
- Lucius Farsuleius Faustus, buried at Cirta, in Numidia, aged fourteen.
- Sextus Farsuleius, named in an inscription from Capena in Etruria.
- Gaius Farsuleius Terentius, buried in the district of Satzvey in the town of Mechernich, formerly part of Germania Inferior.
- Publius Farsuleius, the father of Niger.
- Niger Farsuleius P. f., named in an inscription from Cerrione, formerly part of Cisalpine Gaul.
- Tertius Farsuleius, the father of Primus.
- Primus Farsuleius Terti f., named in an inscription from Cerrione.
- Marcellus Farsuleius, buried at Cerrione.
- Titus Farsuleius, built a monument to his brother, a soldier in the fifteenth legion, who was buried at Carnuntum in Pannonia Superior, aged twenty-five.
- Farsuleius C. f., named in an inscription from Gröblach in Maria Saal, formerly part of Noricum.
- Lucius Farsuleius Felix, of Carthage, a soldier in the second legion, serving at Nicopolis during the reign of Hadrian.

== See also ==
- List of Roman gentes

== Bibliography ==
- Joseph Hilarius Eckhel, Doctrina Numorum Veterum (The Study of Ancient Coins, 1792–1798).
- Dictionary of Greek and Roman Biography and Mythology, William Smith, ed., Little, Brown and Company, Boston (1849).
- Theodor Mommsen et alii, Corpus Inscriptionum Latinarum (The Body of Latin Inscriptions, abbreviated CIL), Berlin-Brandenburgische Akademie der Wissenschaften (1853–present).
- René Cagnat et alii, L'Année épigraphique (The Year in Epigraphy, abbreviated AE), Presses Universitaires de France (1888–present).
- T. P. Wiseman, "The Census in the First Century B.C.", in The Journal of Roman Studies, Vol. 59, No. 1/2 (1969), pp. 59–75.
- Michael Crawford, Roman Republican Coinage, Cambridge University Press (1974, 2001).
