= Ponderano =

- Comune
- Comune di Ponderano
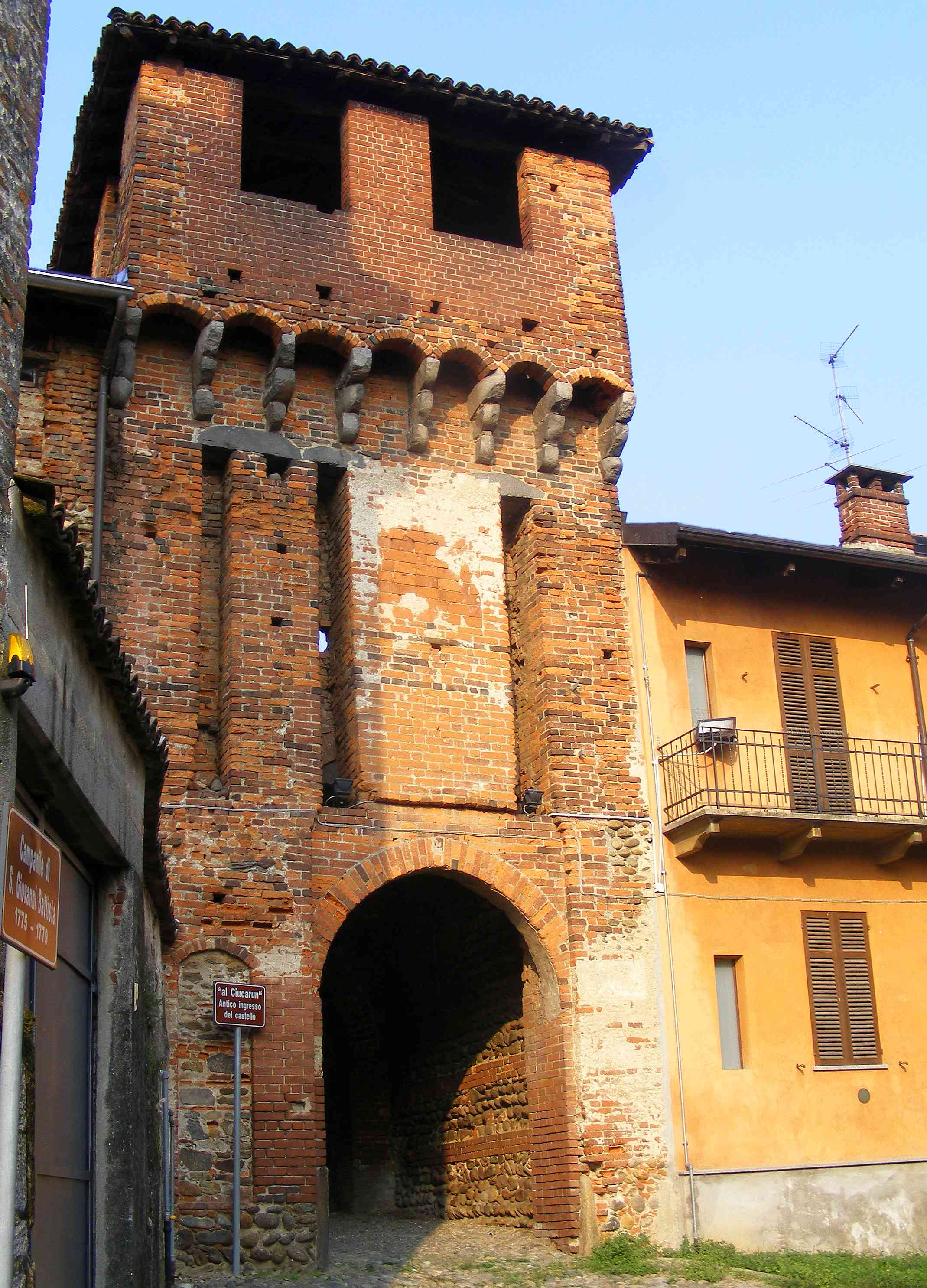
- Entrance to the castle.

- Coat of arms

- Location within Italy Location within Piedmont
- Coordinates: 45°32′N 08°03′E
- Country: Italy
- Region: Piedmont
- Province: Biella (BI)

Government
  - Mayor: Roberto Locca

Area
  - Total: 7.05 km^{2} (2.72 sq mi)
- Elevation: 357 m (1,171 ft)

Population (1 January 2017)
  - Total: 3,792
  - Density: 538/km^{2} (1,390/sq mi)
- Demonym: Ponderanesi
- Time zone: UTC+1 (CET)
  - Summer (DST): UTC+2 (CEST)
- Postal code: 13058
- Dialing code: 015
- Patron saint: St. Lawrence
- Website: Official website

Ponderano ( Pondran [pʊn'draŋ] in Piedmontese, the local dialect ) is a municipality in the province of Biella, Piedmont, northwestern Italy. Neighbouring comuni include Borriana, Gaglianico, Mongrando, Occhieppo Inferiore and Sandigliano.

== Origin of the name ==
According to tradition, the toponym of Ponderano comes from the Latin expression pondere aurum, in reference to a ponderarium, a place for weighing gold-bearing metals, with official certifications.

According to a different hypothesis, it comes instead from a Pons Aerianus, in turn derived from the personal name Aerius or Herius

== History ==
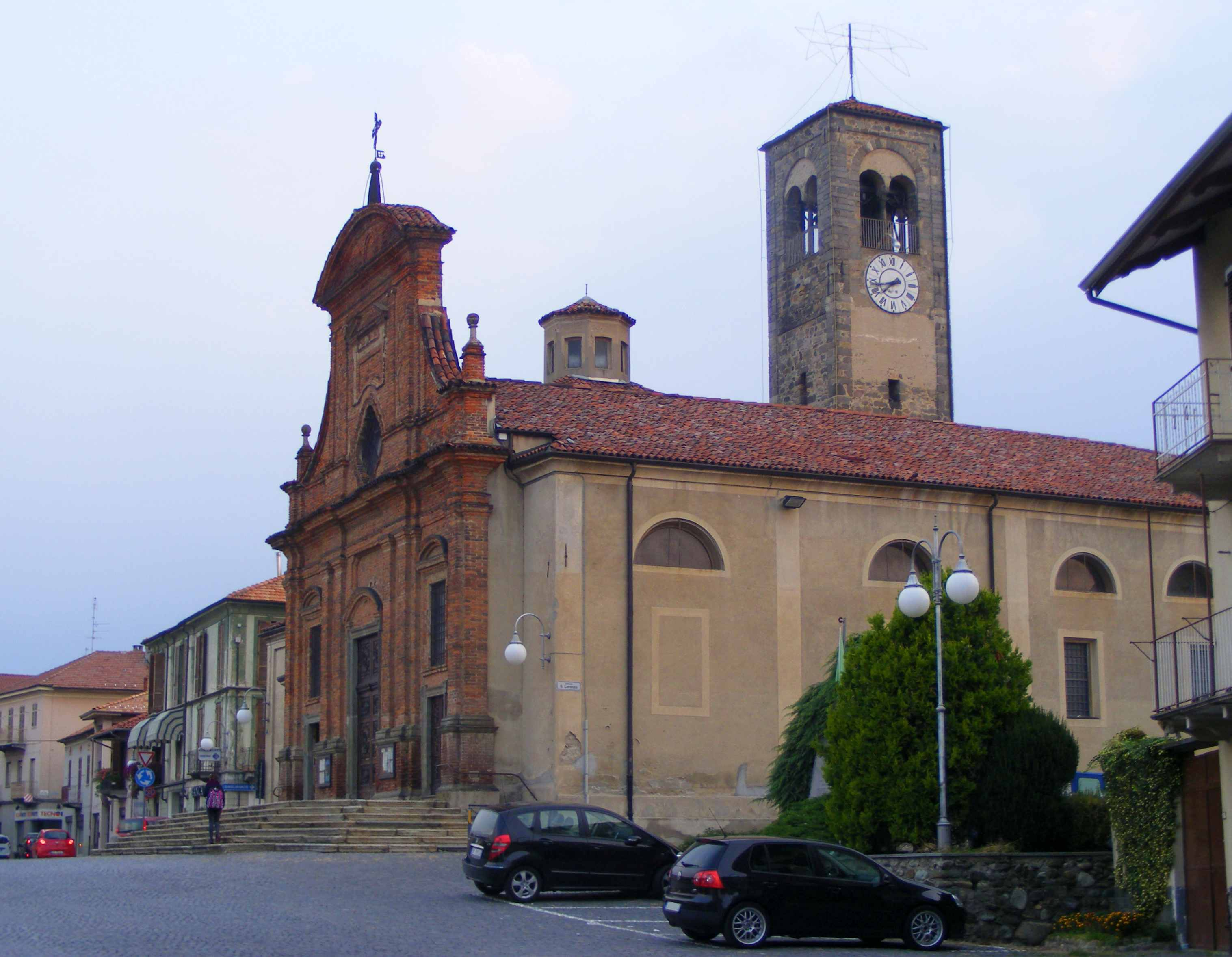
Saint Lawrence parish church.

The oldest mention of Ponderano dates back to the year 882, March 16, the date of a document with which the emperor Charles the Fat gave the church of Saint Eusebius, in the person of Littuardo, bishop of Vercelli, the "grand court" of Biella, to which Ponderano belonged with all its appurtenances areas.

In the first feudal period the village was part of the Vercelli committee. It appears in an imperial diploma of 988, with which the emperor Otto III confirmed the possession of the area to Manfredo of Cavaglià, son of Ajmone, count of Vercelli, who had already obtained the courts of Ponderano and of the territories surrounding Biella from Otto I for an exchange made with the diocese of Vercelli.

In 998, the killing of the bishop Pietro of Vercelli by the marquis Arduino of Ivrea, with the complicity of Manfredo, provoked the reaction of the emperor Otto, who with diplomas dated 7 May 999 and 1 November 1000 returned to the diocese of Vercelli the goods and possessions of the marquis and his relatives and friends, confirming the dominion of everything that the emperor Charles had granted to the bishop Littuardo in 882. The descendants of Manfredo, lords of Montiglio and Camairano, then accepted it from the bishop, but it was subsequently confiscated by Henry II to be given back to the bishop of Vercelli, Leone, in 1014.

After various events, in 1243, the papal legate Gregorio of Montelungo sold it to the municipality of Vercelli, from which it passed into the hands of the Avogadro family of Cerrione to remain there until 1404 when they submitted to the counts of Savoy. Amedeo VIII, having received feudal homage, reinvested them with all the fiefs previously possessed and, among others, with the place, castle and jurisdiction of Ponderano. The Avogadro family then promised to defend and protect the community and individuals and to fulfill all the tasks imposed on them, asking the community in exchange for that the payment of twenty-eight florins per year. The whole life of the community was politically, socially and also economically regulated through announcements and orders, with particular regard to agricultural activity.

In 1409 the castle was destroyed by a fire which also involved a large part of the village and seriously damaged the ancient church. In 1551, with prior authorization from the Duke of Savoy, the Avogadro family ceded the feud, with all the jurisdiction, to the Dal Pozzo family who had already had patrimonial interests in it and who kept it until the feuds were suppressed.

Towards the end of the eighteenth century there was a failed insurrection attempted by some armed rebels, supported by an Avogadro of Formigliana, who threatened to sack the village. However, the united population dispersed Avogadro's armigers and prevented this plan from being carried out, many rebels were arrested and shot and Avogadro himself was only able to save himself thanks to the intervention of the Prince of Carignano.

On December 14, 1798 Ponderano came under French rule and a "patriotic militia" was established there. In 1815, with the fall of Napoleon, it returned under the jurisdiction of the House of Savoy. Throughout the 19th century, excluding a very short period during which it was subjected to Austrian rule ( 1859 ), Ponderano remained in the hands of the Savoy family who, after the unification of Italy, included it in the province of Novara. In 1927 the village passed to the province of Vercelli and later to the province of Biella.

== Symbols ==
The municipality of Ponderano makes use of a coat of arms ab antiquo described as follows:

«of blue, to the golden castle, crenellated in the ghibelline style, with windows of the same, black brick, and turreted to the left of a golden tower, with the arm dressed in silver, moving from the right side of the castle and holding scale in the hand...»

It was delivered on 23 August 1689 pursuant to the ducal edict of 23 May 1687.

== Administration ==
Period		Mayor	Electoral list	Role	Notes
2004	2009	Franco Vallivero	civic list	Mayor	
2009	2014	Franco Vallivero	civic list Together for Ponderano	Mayor	Second term
2014	2019	Elena Chiorino	civic list Ponderano Deserves	Mayor	
2019	2024	Roberto Locca	civic list United for Ponderano	Mayor	

== Sport ==
=== Football ===
The local football team is ASD Ponderano which competes in the Promozione championship.
