= Sandigliano =

- Comune
- Comune di Sandigliano
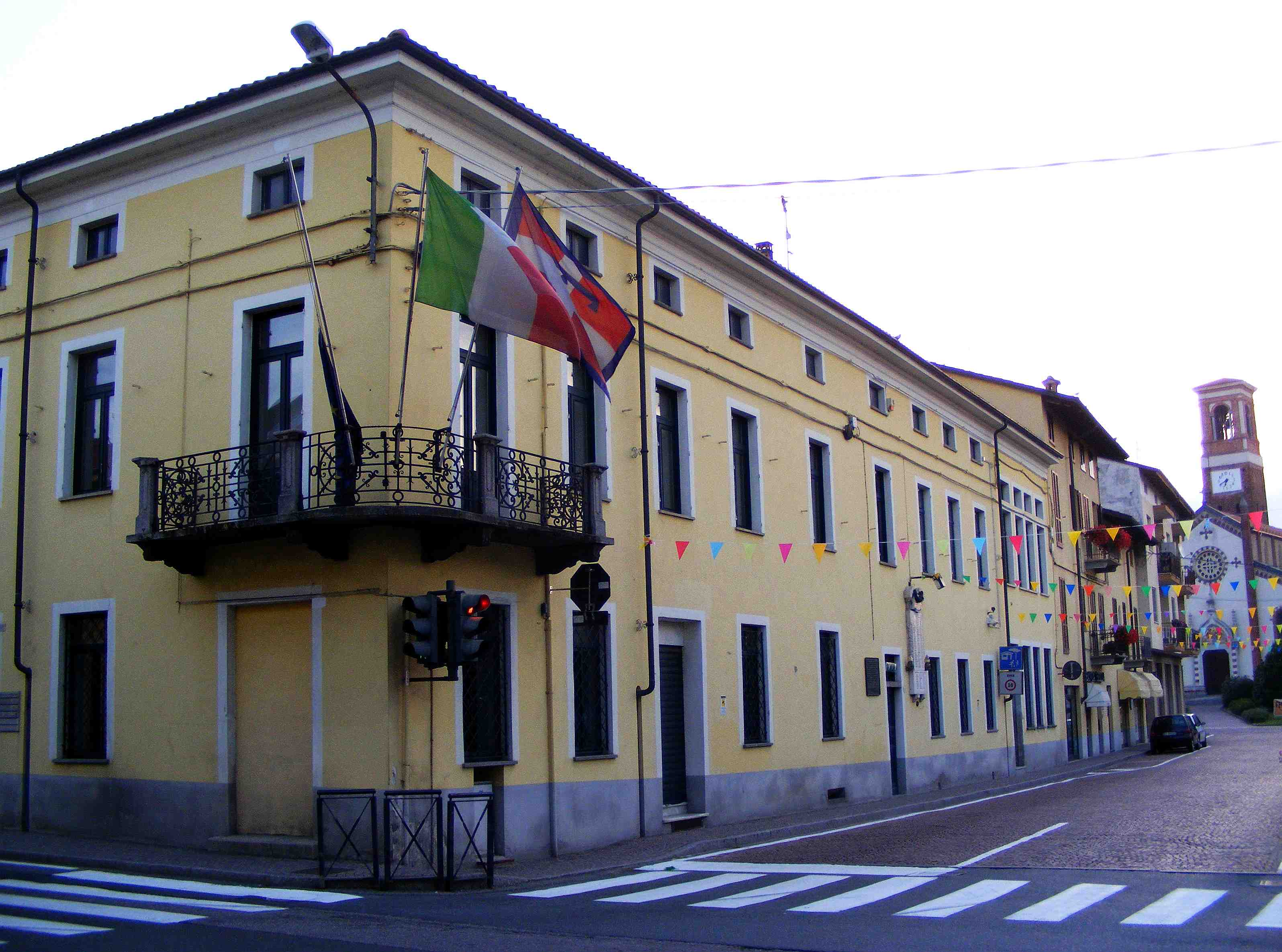
- Sandigliano Town Hall

- Location within Italy Location within Piedmont
- Coordinates: 45°30′N 8°2′E
- Country: Italy
- Region: Piedmont
- Province: Biella (BI)

Government
  - Mayor: Mauro Masiero

Area
  - Total: 10.2 km^{2} (3.9 sq mi)
- Elevation: 323 m (1,060 ft)

Population (31 December 2010)
  - Total: 2,731
  - Density: 268/km^{2} (693/sq mi)
- Demonym: Sandiglianesi
- Time zone: UTC+1 (CET)
  - Summer (DST): UTC+2 (CEST)
- Postal code: 13876
- Dialing code: 015
- Website: Official website

Sandigliano is a comune (municipality) in the Province of Biella in the Italian region Piedmont, located about 50 kilometres (31 mi) northeast of Turin and about 8 kilometres (5 mi) southwest of Biella.

Sandigliano borders the following municipalities: Borriana, Cerrione, Gaglianico, Ponderano, Verrone.

Sandigliano was the birthplace of Ottavio Ottavi, 19th century agronomist and viticulturalist.
