= Santa Maria, Andrate =

Santa Maria
- Chiesa di Santa Maria (Italian)
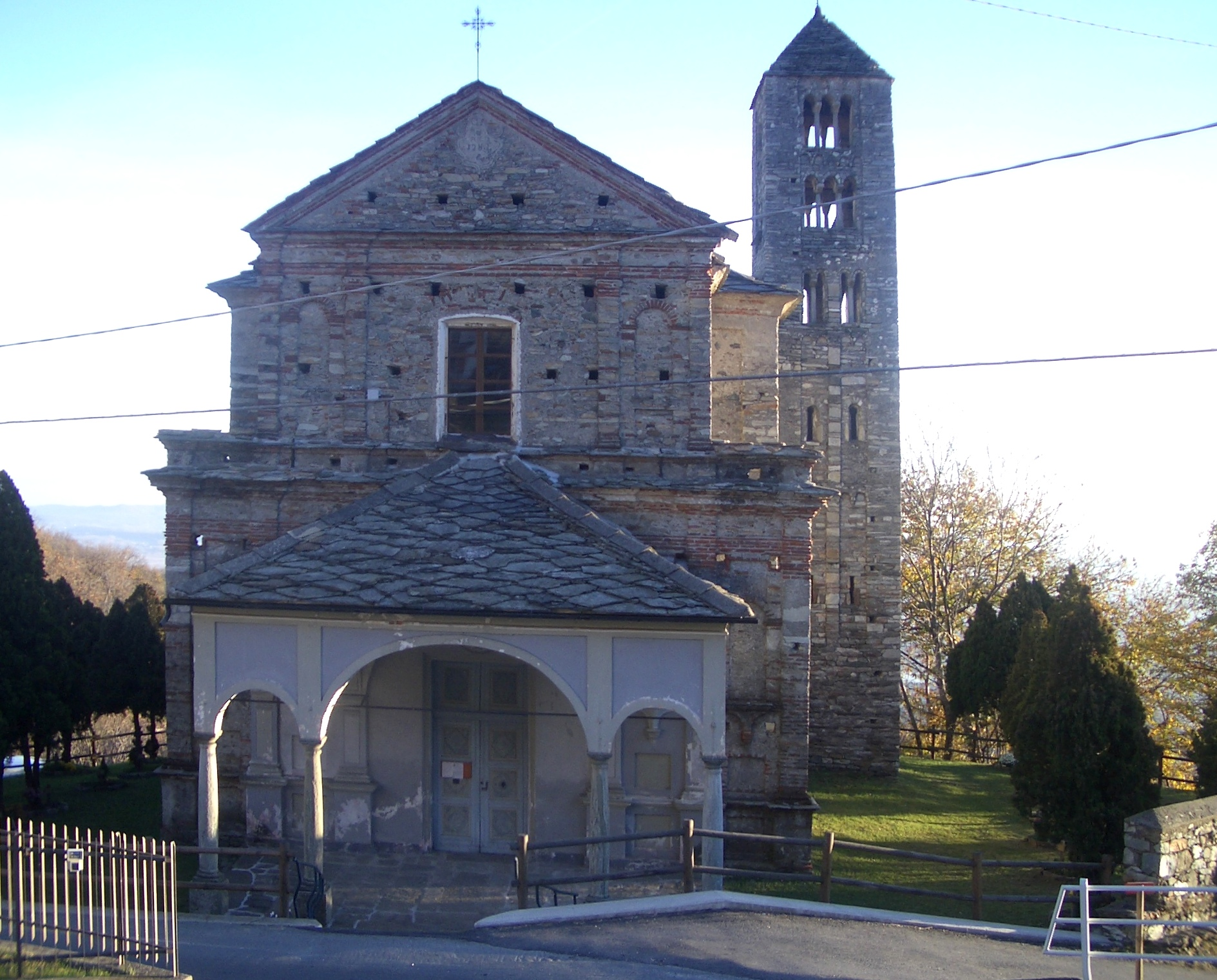
- Santa Maria, Andrate in 2007
- Click on the map for a fullscreen view
- 45°31′34.04″N 7°52′55.13″E
- Location: Andrate
- Country: Italy
- Denomination: Roman Catholic

Architecture
- Functional status: Active

Administration
- Diocese: Diocese of Ivrea

Santa Maria is a Roman Catholic church located in Andrate, Italy.

== History and description ==
The church, situated on an embankment overlooking the Ivrea plain, has medieval origins, as evidenced by the remains of the stone defensive wall that still surrounds it. The present building is the result of extensive alterations carried out between the 18th and 19th centuries, which transformed the original Romanesque layout. Of the ancient structure, only a section of interior wall survives, bearing a fragment of a 15th-century fresco depicting the Virgin Mary and Saint Catherine, the sole remaining trace of the church's original painted decoration.

From an architectural standpoint, the church's most significant feature is its Romanesque bell tower, dating to the late eleventh century and built from local grey and white stone. The tower is divided into six levels, displaying a carefully graduated sequence of openings: from narrow slits at the base to single- and double-light windows, culminating in two upper tiers of rounded triple-light windows framed by decorative Lombard bands. The stone columns supporting the capitals of the double- and triple-light windows are, in some cases, embellished with ornamental carvings at their extremities.
