= Donato, Piedmont =

Donato
- Comune
- Comune di Donato
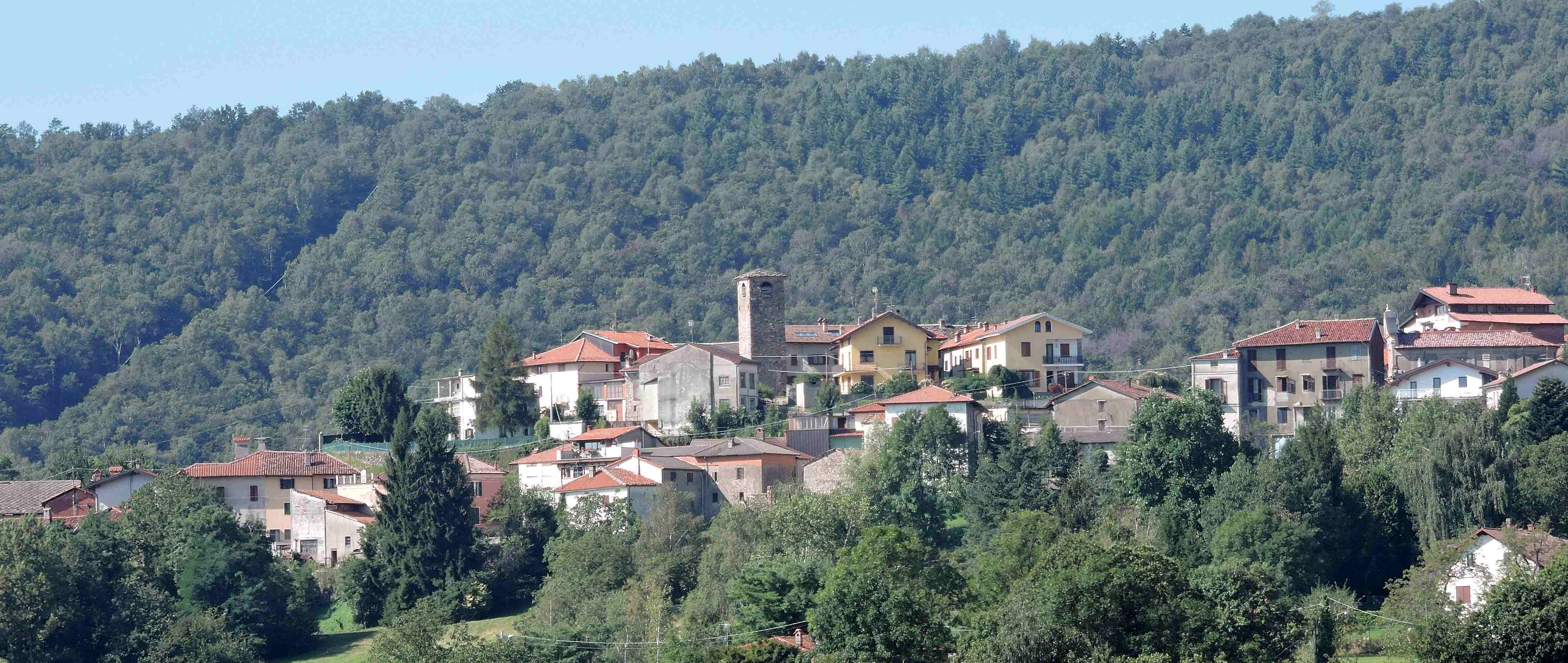
- View of Donato

- Location within Italy Location within Piedmont
- Coordinates: 45°32′N 7°52′E
- Country: Italy
- Region: Piedmont
- Province: Biella (BI)

Government
  - Mayor: Desirèe Duoccio

Area
  - Total: 12.07 km^{2} (4.66 sq mi)
- Elevation: 711 m (2,333 ft)

Population (31 December 2021)
  - Total: 709
  - Density: 58.7/km^{2} (152/sq mi)
- Demonym: Donatesi
- Time zone: UTC+1 (CET)
  - Summer (DST): UTC+2 (CEST)
- Postal code: 13050
- Dialing code: 015
- Website: Official website

Donato is a comune (municipality) in the Province of Biella in the Italian region Piedmont, located about 50 kilometres (31 mi) north of Turin and about 15 kilometres (9 mi) west of Biella.

Donato borders the following municipalities: Andrate, Chiaverano, Graglia, Mongrando, Netro, Sala Biellese, Settimo Vittone.

== History ==
The name, of Roman origin, testifies to the antiquity of the settlement, in a strategic position for communications between Biella, the Canavese and the Aosta Valley. Around 1150 the bishop of Vercelli, Uguccione, bought this place for his church, along with the lands of Zumaglia, Netro and Verrua. Subsequently, Donato passed to Avogadro of Cerrione, who came into conflict with the church of Vercelli, in 1434 lost this estate, which was sold by a judgment of the Count of Savoy to the bishop of Vercelli, together with the castles of Cerrione, Mongiovetto, Ponderano, Quaregna, Valdengo, Villa and Zubiena.

In 1706 the town was almost completely destroyed by French troops.
