= Sala Biellese =

- Comune
- Comune di Sala Biellese
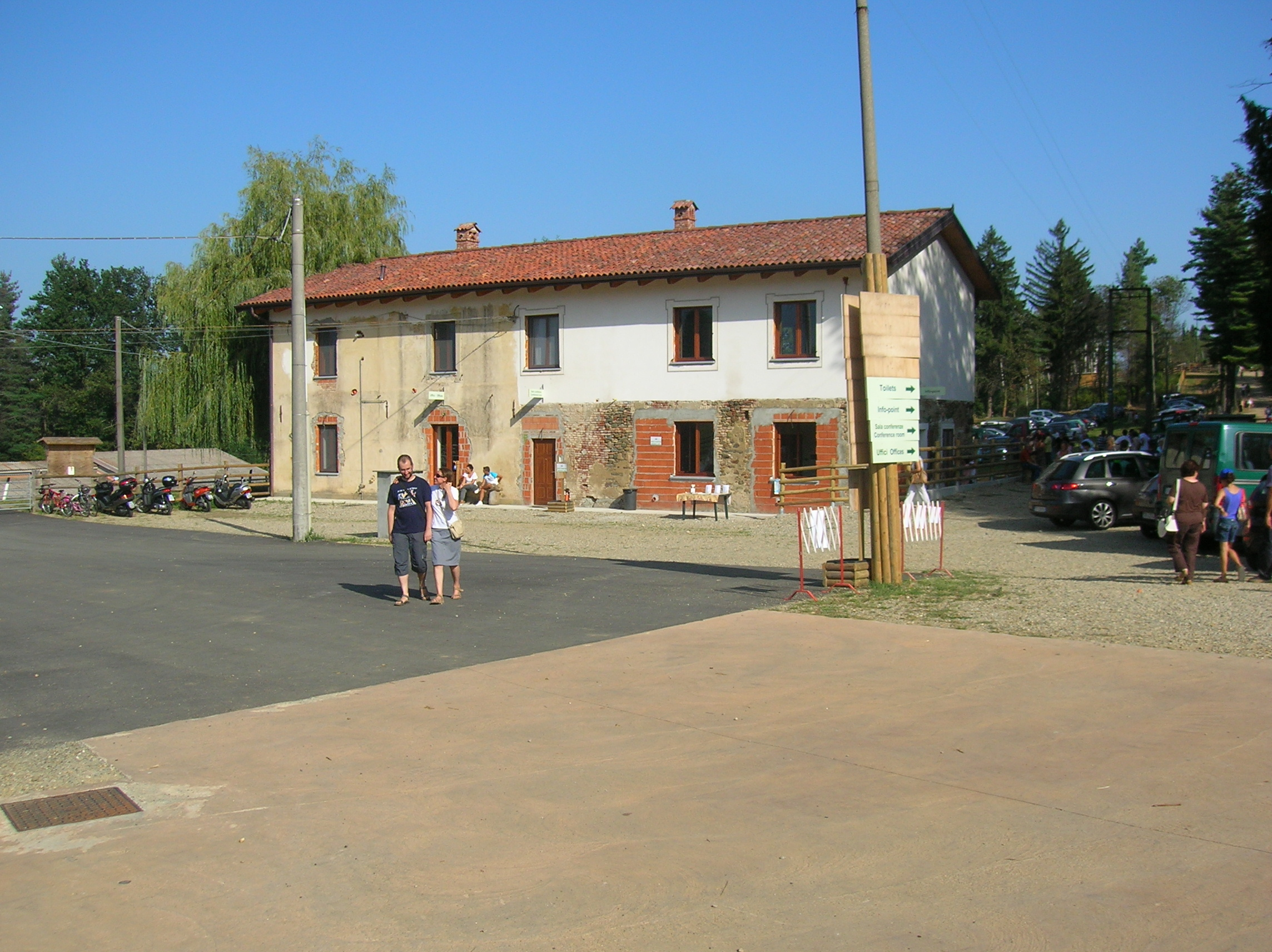
- View of Sala Biellese

- Location within Italy Location within Piedmont
- Coordinates: 45°30′N 7°57′E
- Country: Italy
- Region: Piedmont
- Province: Biella (BI)

Government
  - Mayor: Michela Pasquin

Area
  - Total: 8.1 km^{2} (3.1 sq mi)
- Elevation: 626 m (2,054 ft)

Population (31 December 2010)
  - Total: 627
  - Density: 77/km^{2} (200/sq mi)
- Demonym: Salesi
- Time zone: UTC+1 (CET)
  - Summer (DST): UTC+2 (CEST)
- Postal code: 13050
- Dialing code: 015
- Patron saint: St. Martin
- Saint day: 11 November
- Website: Official website

Sala Biellese is a comune (municipality) in the Province of Biella in the Italian region of Piedmont, located about 50 kilometres (31 mi) northeast of Turin and about 12 kilometres (7 mi) southwest of Biella.

Sala Biellese borders the following municipalities: Chiaverano, Donato, Mongrando, Torrazzo, and Zubiena.
