= Muzzano, Piedmont =

Muzzano
- Comune
- Comune di Muzzano
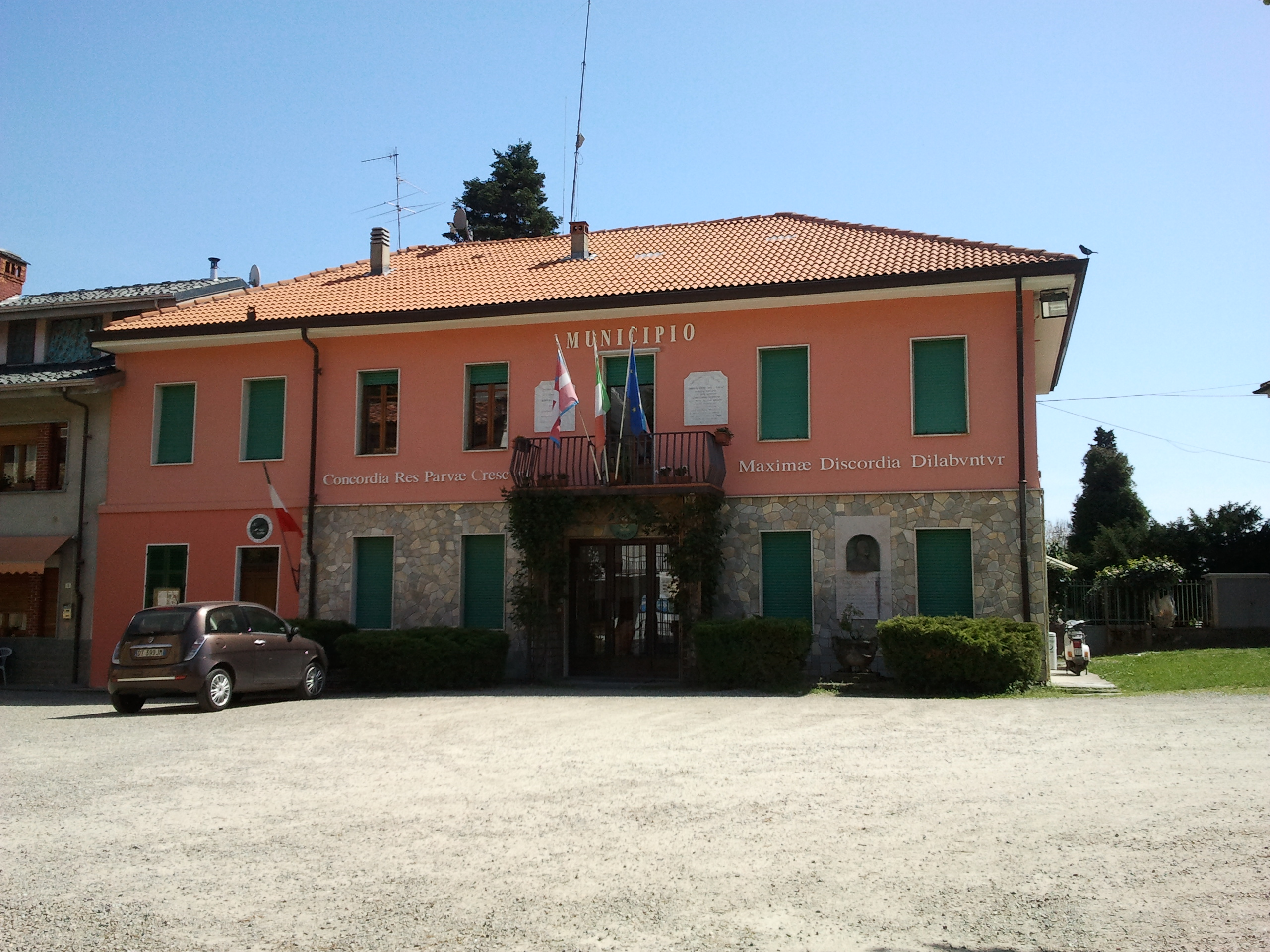
- Town hall

- Location within Italy Location within Piedmont
- Coordinates: 45°33′N 7°59′E
- Country: Italy
- Region: Piedmont
- Province: Province of Biella (BI)

Area
  - Total: 5.9 km^{2} (2.3 sq mi)

Population (Dec. 2004)
  - Total: 673
  - Density: 110/km^{2} (300/sq mi)
- Demonym: Muzzanesi
- Time zone: UTC+1 (CET)
  - Summer (DST): UTC+2 (CEST)
- Postal code: 12050
- Dialing code: 015

Muzzano is a comune (municipality) in the Province of Biella in the Italian region Piedmont, located about 60 kilometres (37 mi) northeast of Turin and about 7 kilometres (4 mi) southwest of Biella. 31 December 2004, it had a population of 673 and an area of 5.9 square kilometres (2.3 mi^{2}).

Muzzano borders the following municipalities: Camburzano, Graglia, Occhieppo Superiore, Sordevolo.

== Demographic evolution ==
Historical population

Year	Pop.	±%
1861	781	—
1871	825	+5.6%
1881	908	+10.1%
1901	749	−17.5%
1911	650	−13.2%

Year	Pop.	±%
1921	665	+2.3%
1931	668	+0.5%
1936	637	−4.6%
1951	710	+11.5%
1961	673	−5.2%

Year	Pop.	±%
1971	635	−5.6%
1981	610	−3.9%
1991	653	+7.0%
2001	673	+3.1%

Source: Data from ISTAT
