= Cerrione =

- Comune
- Comune di Cerrione
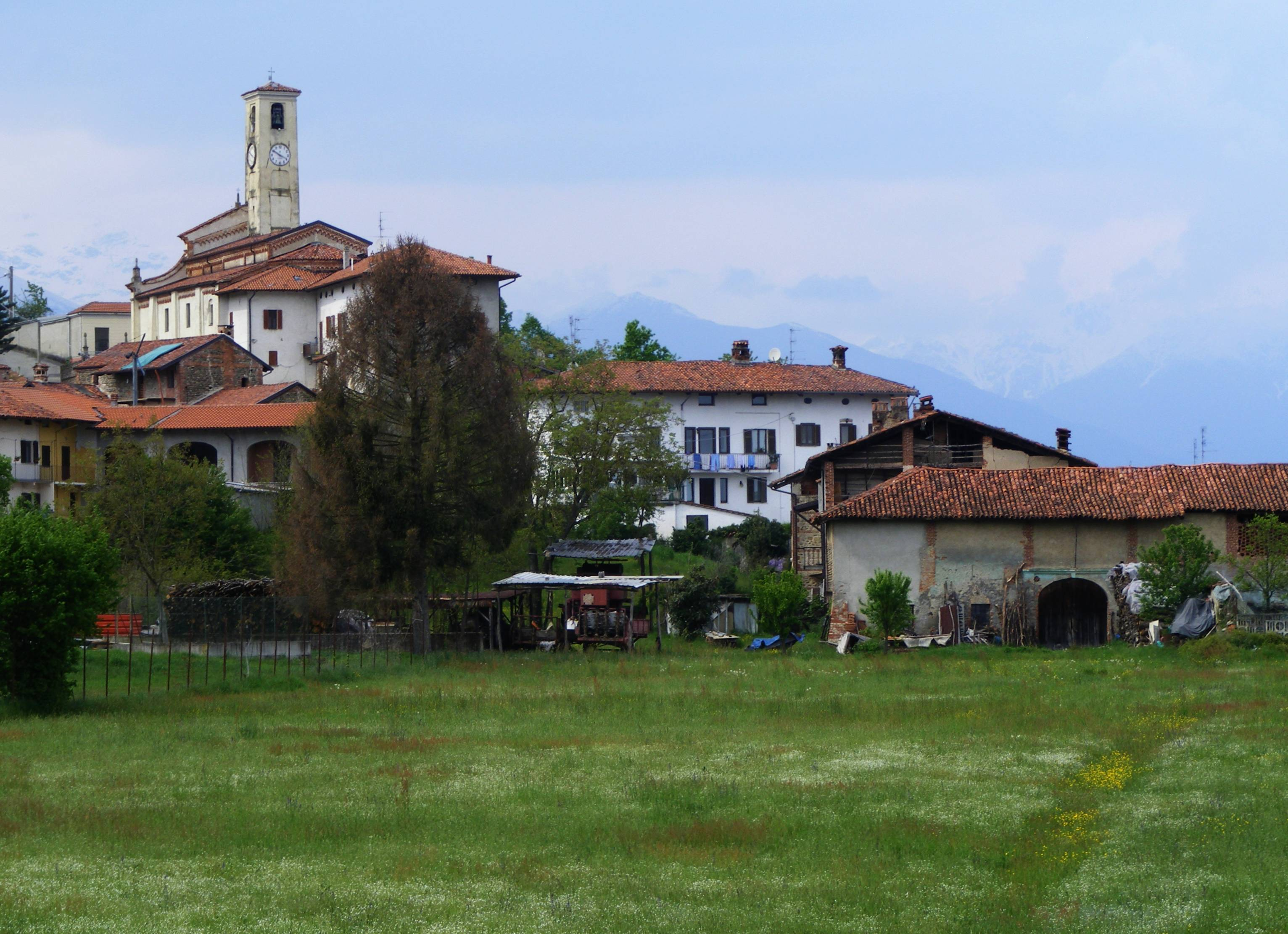
- View of Cerrione

- Coat of arms

- Location within Italy Location within Piedmont
- Coordinates: 45°28′N 8°4′E
- Country: Italy
- Region: Piedmont
- Province: Biella (BI)
- Frazioni: Magnonevolo, Vergnasco

Government
  - Mayor: Anna Maria Zerbola

Area
  - Total: 27.9 km^{2} (10.8 sq mi)
- Elevation: 250 m (820 ft)

Population (30 June 2017)
  - Total: 2,897
  - Density: 104/km^{2} (269/sq mi)
- Demonym: Cerrionesi
- Time zone: UTC+1 (CET)
  - Summer (DST): UTC+2 (CEST)
- Postal code: 13882
- Dialing code: 015
- Website: Official website

Cerrione is a comune (municipality) in the Province of Biella in the Italian region Piedmont, located about 50 kilometres (31 mi) northeast of Turin and about 11 kilometres (7 mi) south of Biella.

Cerrione borders the following municipalities: Borriana, Magnano, Roppolo, Salussola, Sandigliano, Verrone, Zimone, Zubiena.

Biella-Cerrione Airfield is located in Cerrione.
