= Gaglianico =

- Comune
- Comune di Gaglianico
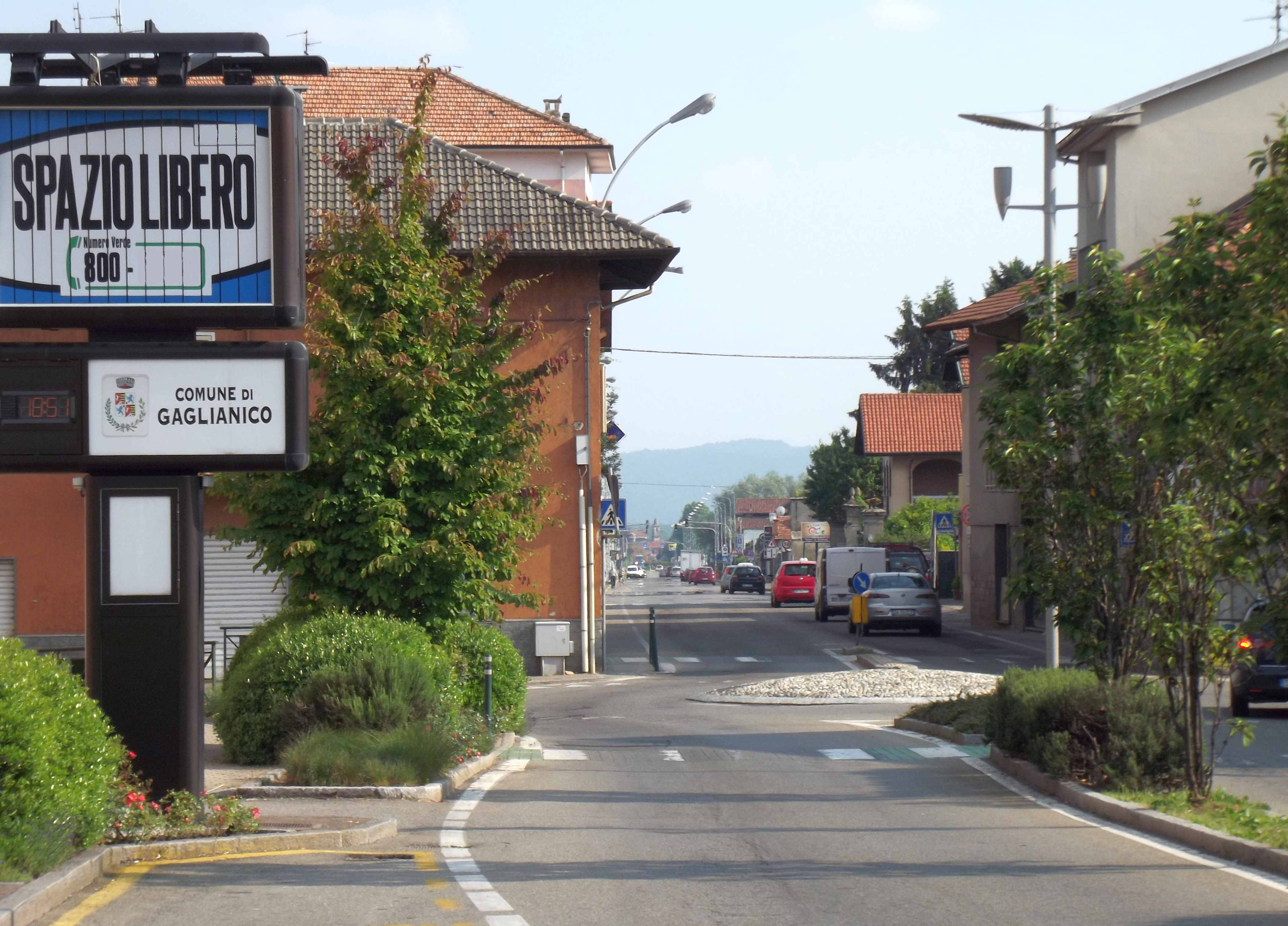
- View of Gaglianico

- Coat of arms

- Location within Italy Location within Piedmont
- Coordinates: 45°33′N 8°7′E
- Country: Italy
- Region: Piedmont
- Province: Biella (BI)

Government
  - Mayor: Andrea Quaregna

Area
  - Total: 4.5 km^{2} (1.7 sq mi)
- Elevation: 353 m (1,158 ft)

Population (31 December 2010)
  - Total: 3,931
  - Density: 870/km^{2} (2,300/sq mi)
- Demonym: Gaglianichesi
- Time zone: UTC+1 (CET)
  - Summer (DST): UTC+2 (CEST)
- Postal code: 13894
- Dialing code: 015
- Patron saint: St. Peter
- Website: Official website

Gaglianico is a comune (municipality) in the Province of Biella in the Italian region Piedmont, located about 60 kilometres (37 mi) northeast of Turin and about 4 kilometres (2 mi) southeast of Biella.

Gaglianico borders the following municipalities: Biella, Candelo, Ponderano, Sandigliano, Verrone.

== Twin towns ==
Gaglianico is twinned with:

- Nova Gorica, Slovenia
- Estella-Lizarra, Spain
- Deta, Romania

== People ==
- Andrea Zanchetta (born 2 February 1975), footballer.
