= Mount Cavallaria =

Mountain in Italy

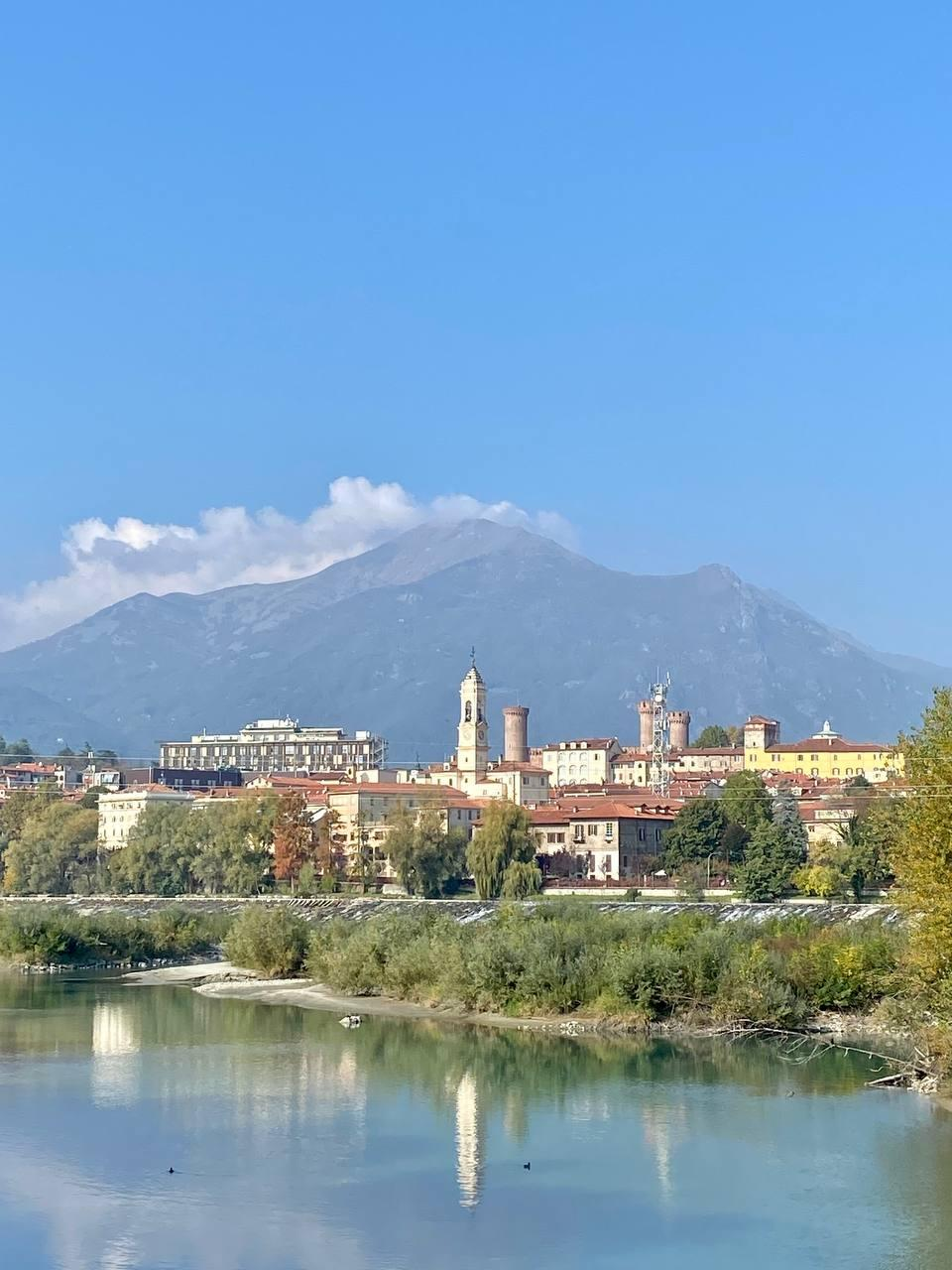
- Mount Cavallaria, on the right, from Ivrea.

Highest point
- Elevation: 1,464 m (4,803 ft)
- Coordinates: 45°31′15″N 7°48′34″E

Geography
- Location within Alps
- Location: Province of Turin, Italy

Mount Cavallaria (or simply Cavallaria; Italian: Monte Cavallaria) is a mountain of the Graian Alps, in northern Italy. It visually marks, along with Colma di Mombarone on the opposite side, the entrance of the Aosta Valley from the Po plain, forming one of landforms that define the Ivrea Morainic Amphitheatre. Administratively, it lies entirely within the Piedmont region, in the municipality of Brosso.

== Description ==
The mountain known for its quartz veins, which have been quarried since the 19th century. The Alpetta, Piani, Rio Freddo, and Frent quarries have yielded exceptionally high-purity quartz, used both for industrial applications and by mineral collectors.

== SOIUSA classification ==
According to the SOIUSA (International Standardized Mountain Subdivision of the Alps) the mountain can be classified in the following way:

- main part = Western Alps
- major sector = North Western Alps
- section = Graian Alps
- subsection = Alpi del Gran Paradiso
- supergroup = Gruppo della Rosa dei Banchi
- group = Costiera del Monte Marzo
