= Andrate =

- Comune
- Comune di Andrate
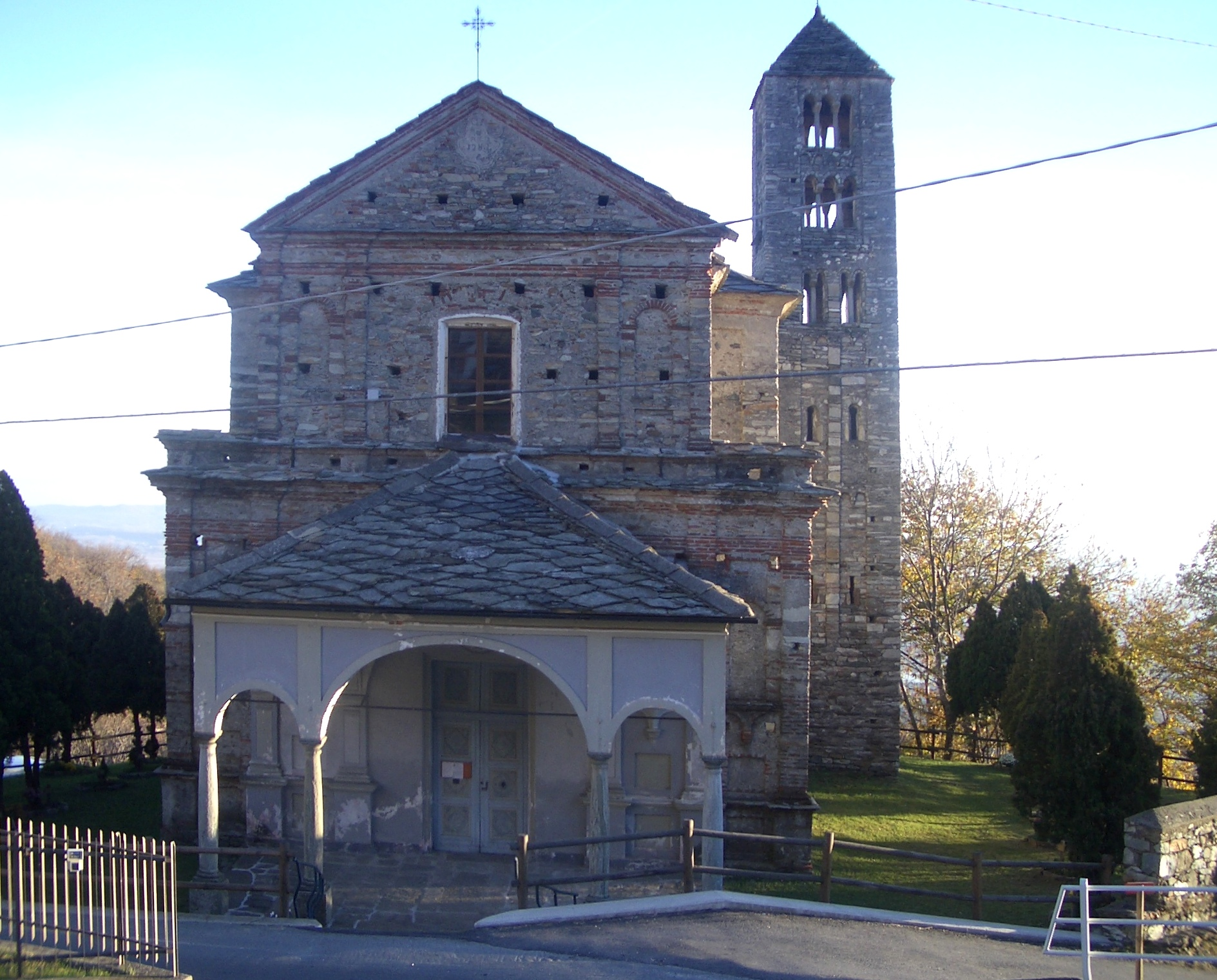

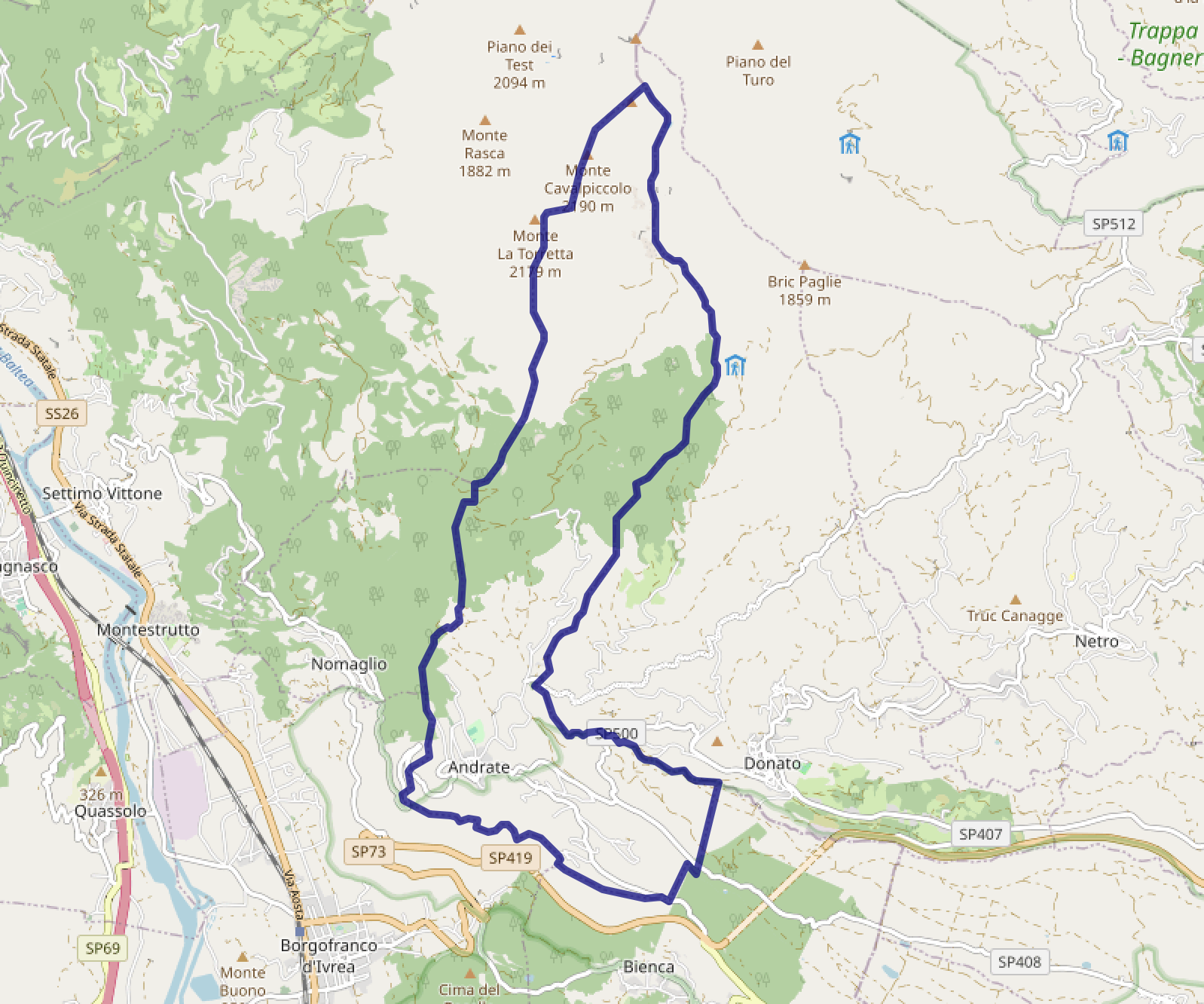

- Location of Andrate in Italy Andrate (Piedmont)
- Coordinates: 45°32′N 7°52′E
- Country: Italy
- Region: Piedmont
- Metropolitan city: Turin (TO)

Government
  - Mayor: Enrico Bovo

Area
  - Total: 9.31 km^{2} (3.59 sq mi)
- Elevation: 820 m (2,690 ft)

Population (30 November 2017)
  - Total: 489
  - Density: 52.5/km^{2} (136/sq mi)
- Demonym: Andratesi
- Time zone: UTC+1 (CET)
  - Summer (DST): UTC+2 (CEST)
- Postal code: 10010
- Dialing code: 0125
- Website: Official website

Andrate (Piedmontese: Andrà) is a comune (municipality) in the Metropolitan City of Turin in the Italian region Piedmont, located about 50 kilometres (31 mi) north of Turin.

Andrate borders the following municipalities: Settimo Vittone, Donato, Nomaglio, Borgofranco d'Ivrea, and Chiaverano. It is located at the top of the Moraine of Ivrea, with elevations ranging from 550 to 2,227 meters above the sea level.
