= Occhieppo Inferiore =

- Comune
- Comune di Occhieppo Inferiore
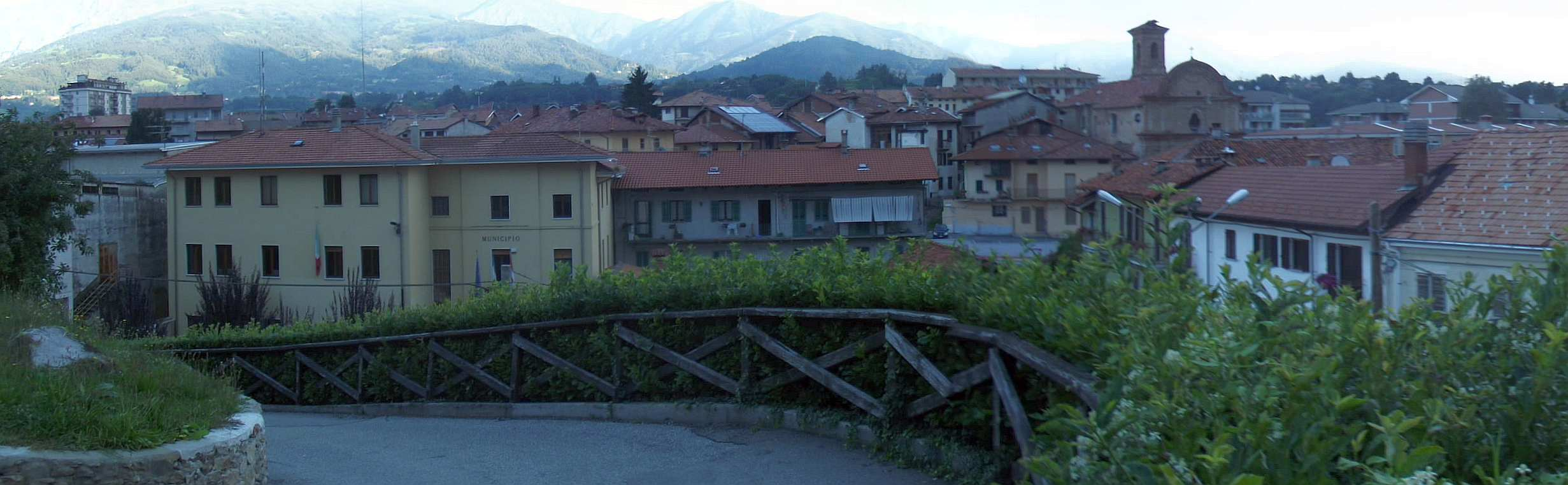
- View of Occhieppo Inferiore

- Coat of arms

- Location within Italy Location within Piedmont
- Coordinates: 45°31′N 8°0′E
- Country: Italy
- Region: Piedmont
- Province: Biella (BI)

Government
  - Mayor: Monica Mosca

Area
  - Total: 4.06 km^{2} (1.57 sq mi)
- Elevation: 416 m (1,365 ft)

Population (30 November 2016)
  - Total: 3,964
  - Density: 976/km^{2} (2,530/sq mi)
- Demonym: Occhieppesi
- Time zone: UTC+1 (CET)
  - Summer (DST): UTC+2 (CEST)
- Postal code: 13897
- Dialing code: 015
- Website: Official website

Occhieppo Inferiore is a comune (municipality) in the Province of Biella in the Italian region Piedmont, located about 80 kilometres (50 mi) northeast of Turin.

Occhieppo Inferiore borders the following municipalities: Biella, Camburzano, Mongrando, Occhieppo Superiore, Ponderano.
