= Occhieppo Superiore =

Comune in the Province of Biella

- Comune
- Comune di Occhieppo Superiore
- View of Occhieppo Inferiore

- Coat of arms

- Location within Italy Location within Piedmont
- Coordinates: 45°30′N 8°0′E
- Country: Italy
- Region: Piedmont
- Province: Biella (BI)

Government
  - Mayor: Emanuele Ramella Pralungo

Area
  - Total: 5.2 km^{2} (2.0 sq mi)
- Elevation: 465 m (1,526 ft)

Population (30 November 2017)
  - Total: 2,744
  - Density: 530/km^{2} (1,400/sq mi)
- Demonym: Occhieppesi
- Time zone: UTC+1 (CET)
  - Summer (DST): UTC+2 (CEST)
- Postal code: 13056
- Dialing code: 015
- Website: Official website

Occhieppo Superiore is a comune (municipality) in the Province of Biella in the Italian region Piedmont, located about 80 kilometres (50 mi) northeast of Turin and about 3 kilometres (2 mi) southwest of Biella.

Occhieppo Superiore borders the following municipalities: Biella, Camburzano, Muzzano, Occhieppo Inferiore, Pollone, Sordevolo.
