= Nomaglio =

- Comune
- Comune di Nomaglio
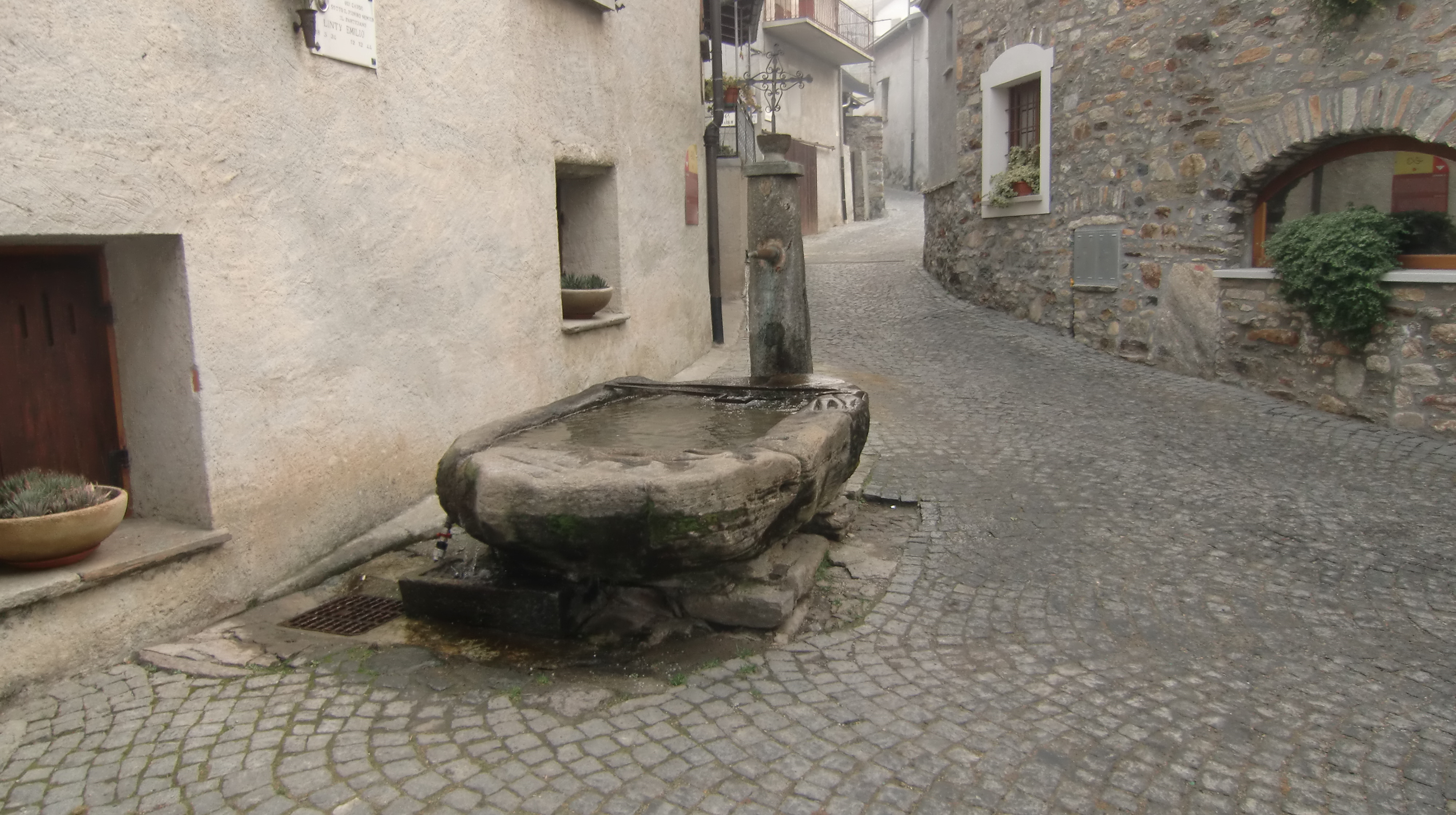

- Coat of arms

- Location within Italy Location within Piedmont
- Coordinates: 45°32′N 7°52′E
- Country: Italy
- Region: Piedmont
- Metropolitan city: Turin (TO)

Government
  - Mayor: Ellade Giacinta Peller

Area
  - Total: 3.1 km^{2} (1.2 sq mi)
- Elevation: 575 m (1,886 ft)

Population (31 December 2010)
  - Total: 320
  - Density: 100/km^{2} (270/sq mi)
- Demonym: Nomagliesi
- Time zone: UTC+1 (CET)
  - Summer (DST): UTC+2 (CEST)
- Postal code: 10010
- Dialing code: 0125
- Patron saint: St. Bartholomew
- Saint day: 24 August
- Website: Official website

Nomaglio is a comune (municipality) in the Metropolitan City of Turin in the Italian region Piedmont, located about 50 kilometres (31 mi) north of Turin.

Nomaglio is an agricultural centre in the Canavese traditional region, on the slopes of the Serra d'Ivrea. Historically, this commune was the seat of the medieval lords of Settimo Vittone.
