= Graglia =

Graglia Graja
- Comune
- Comune di Graglia
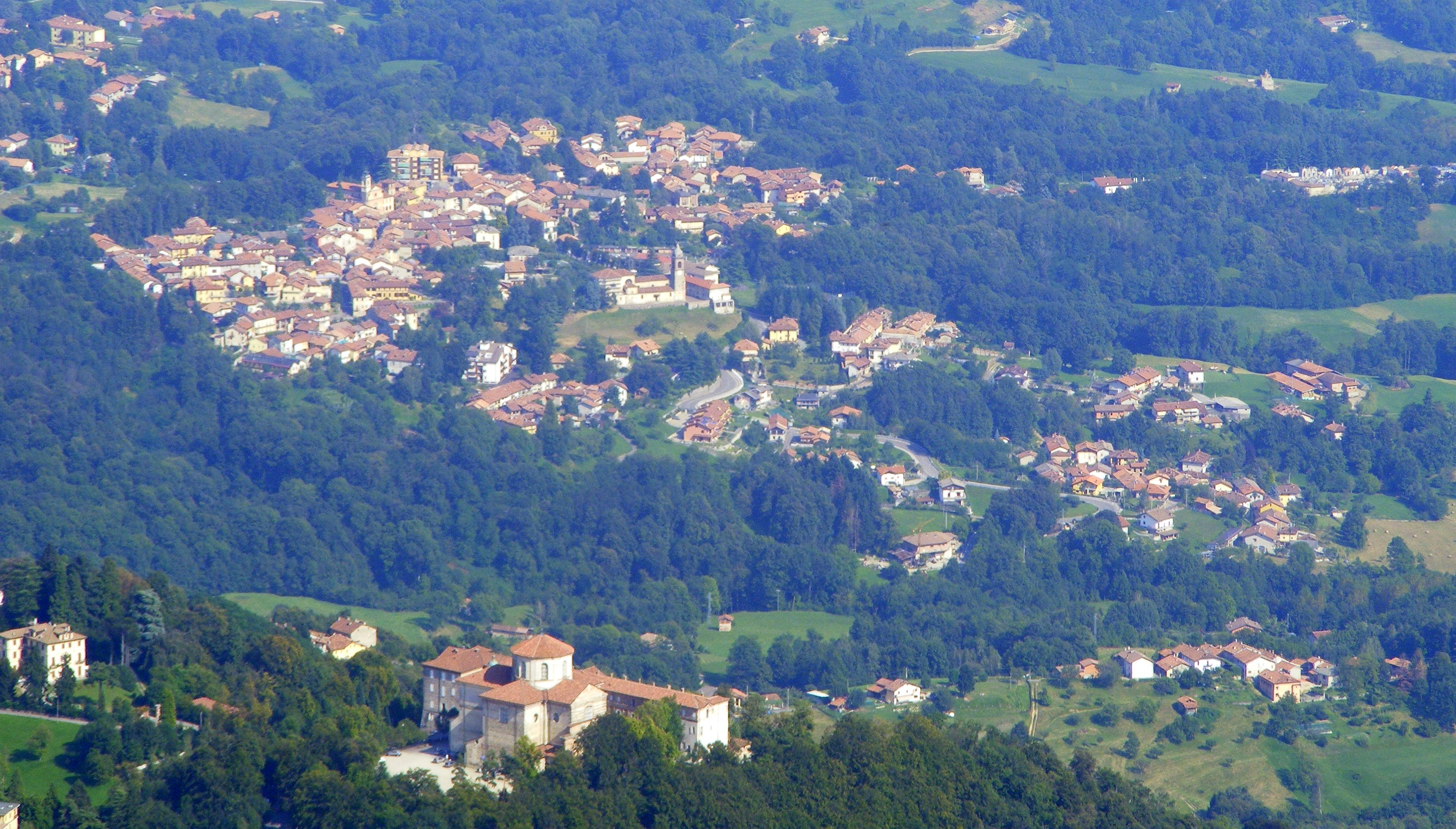
- Panorama from Alpe Amburnero

- Coat of arms

- Location within Italy Location within Piedmont
- Coordinates: 45°33′N 7°59′E
- Country: Italy
- Region: Piedmont
- Province: Biella (BI)

Government
  - Mayor: Elena Rocchi

Area
  - Total: 20.3 km^{2} (7.8 sq mi)
- Elevation: 596 m (1,955 ft)

Population (31 August 2017)
  - Total: 1,504
  - Density: 74.1/km^{2} (192/sq mi)
- Demonym: Gragliesi
- Time zone: UTC+1 (CET)
  - Summer (DST): UTC+2 (CEST)
- Postal code: 13050
- Dialing code: 015
- Website: Official website

Graglia (Piedmontese: Graja) is a comune (municipality) in the Province of Biella in the Italian region Piedmont, located about 60 kilometres (37 mi) northeast of Turin and about 7 kilometres (4 mi) southwest of Biella.

The communal territory includes the Mombarone peak and Lake Ingagna. It is home to the Sacro Monte di Graglia sanctuary.
