= Borriana, Piedmont =

Borriana
- Comune
- Comune di Borriana
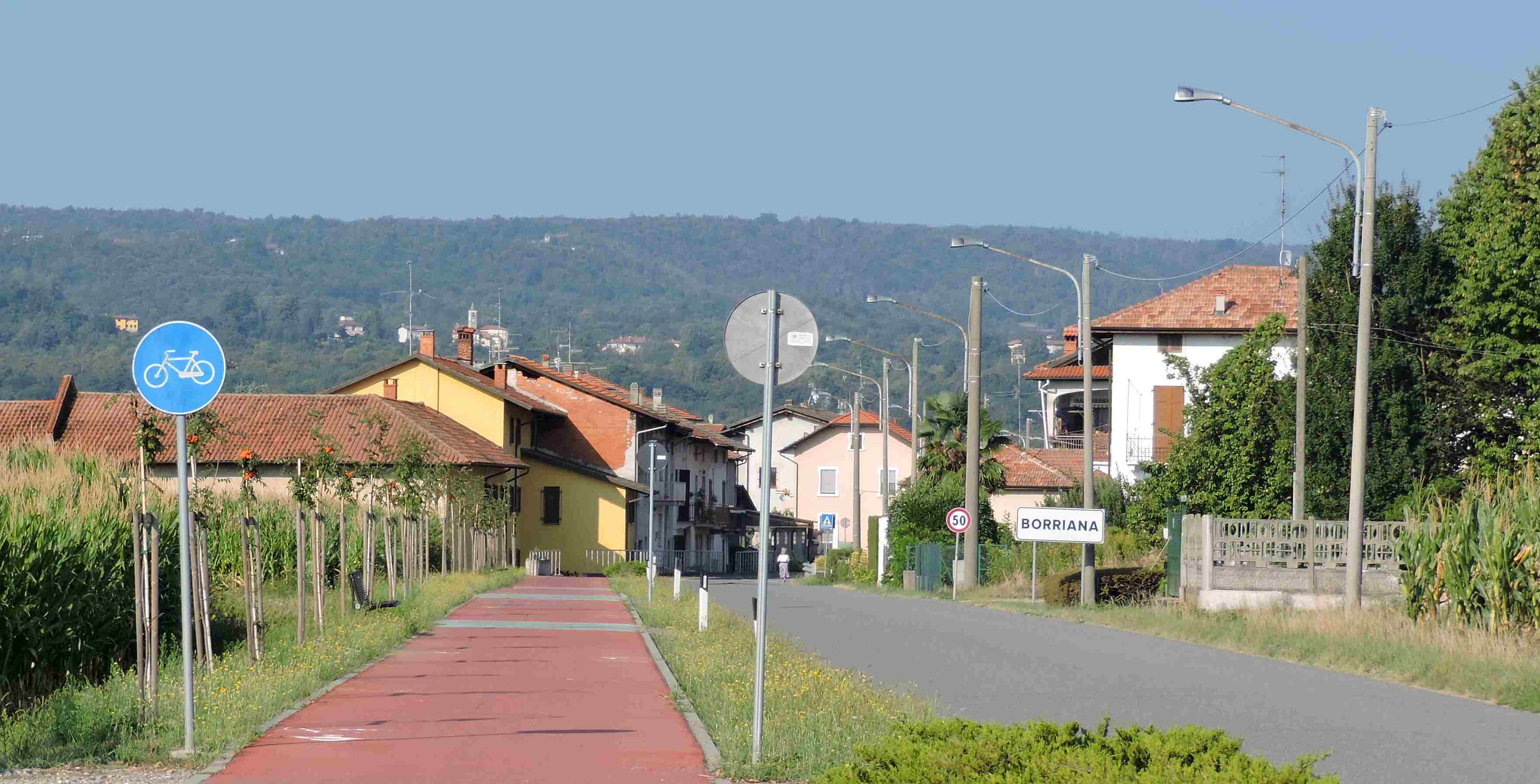
- View of Borriana

- Coat of arms

- Location within Italy Location within Piedmont
- Coordinates: 45°30′N 8°2′E
- Country: Italy
- Region: Piedmont
- Province: Biella (BI)

Government
  - Mayor: Francesca Guerriero

Area
  - Total: 5 km^{2} (1.9 sq mi)
- Elevation: 350 m (1,150 ft)

Population (30 April 2017)
  - Total: 896
  - Density: 180/km^{2} (460/sq mi)
- Time zone: UTC+1 (CET)
  - Summer (DST): UTC+2 (CEST)
- Postal code: 13050
- Dialing code: 015
- Website: Official website

Borriana is a commune in the province of Biella, Piedmont, northern Italy.
