= Pieve di Sant'Andrea =

Pieve di Sant'Andrea may refer to the following churches in Italy:

- Pieve di Sant'Andrea (Cercina)
- Pieve di Sant'Andrea (Pistoia)
- Pieve di Sant'Andrea, Sarzana

== See also ==
- Pieve (disambiguation)
