= Olivetti (surname) =

Olivetti is an Italian surname. Notable people with the surname include:

- Adriano Olivetti (1901–1960), Italian engineer, politician and industrialist
- Albano Olivetti (born 1991), French tennis player
- Angelo Oliviero Olivetti (1874–1931), Italian lawyer, journalist, and political activist
- Ariel Olivetti (born 1967), Argentine comic book penciller
- Camillo Olivetti (1868–1943), Italian electrical engineer and founder of Olivetti & Co., SpA.
- Eva Olivetti (1924-2013), Uruguayan painter
- Luigi Olivetti (1856–1941), Italian painter and engraver
- Martino Olivetti (born 1985), former Italian footballer

== See also ==
- Olivotti (disambiguation)
