= Villa Poma =

- Frazione
- Location of Villa Poma in Italy
- Coordinates: 45°0′N 11°7′E
- Country: Italy
- Region: Lombardy
- Province: Mantua (MN)
- Comune: Borgo Mantovano

Area
  - Total: 14.3 km^{2} (5.5 sq mi)
- Elevation: 13 m (43 ft)

Population (Dec. 2004)
  - Total: 2,057
  - Density: 144/km^{2} (373/sq mi)
- Demonym: Villapomesi
- Time zone: UTC+1 (CET)
  - Summer (DST): UTC+2 (CEST)
- Postal code: 46020
- Dialing code: 0386

Villa Poma is a frazione of Borgo Mantovano in the Province of Mantua in the Italian region Lombardy, located about 160 kilometres (99 mi) southeast of Milan and about 30 kilometres (19 mi) southeast of Mantua. Villa Poma (Vìla Poma in lower-Mantuan dialect), known as Mulo prior to Italian annexation in 1869, is a geographic district of Borgo Mantovano in the province of Mantua in Lombardy.

It has 2,023 inhabitants.

== Origins of the name ==
Originally the centre was called Mulo, from the Latin mullus, "wet." In 1869, it took its current name in memory of the doctor and patriot Carlo Poma, martyr of Belfiore, who often stayed here at his mother's villa.

== History ==
On 22 October 2017, in conjunction with the regional referendum on autonomy, there was a referendum on the union between the three Mantuan municipalities (Revere, Pieve di Coriano and Villa Poma), which was supported by 56.58% of voters. At the referendum, the voters were also able to choose the name of the new town, choosing between the three proposals of Borgo Mantovano, Borgoltrepo or Riva Mantovana. The unification put an end to the division from Revere decreed by the German rulers of the then Lombardy-Venetia Kingdom on 12 February 1816. The new town of Borgo Mantovano has been operational since 1 January 2018.

== Symbols ==
The coat of arms of Villa Poma was emblazoned: silver, bordered at the top by narrow red edging, charged with the Christogram IHS in black and at the bottom by a narrow green edge; the field with the bust of Carlo Poma in profile, accompanied on either side by two laurel branches curved in green and surmounted by a star with five golden rays.

== Monuments and sights ==
Important sites include the Church of St Michael Archangel, from 900, and the Parish of Sant’Andrea of Ghisione.
