= San Francesco, Sarzana =

Roman Catholic church in Liguria region, Italy

Coordinates: 44°06′52.0″N 9°57′50.4″E

San Francesco is a Roman Catholic church and monastery located in Sarzana, region of Liguria, Italy.

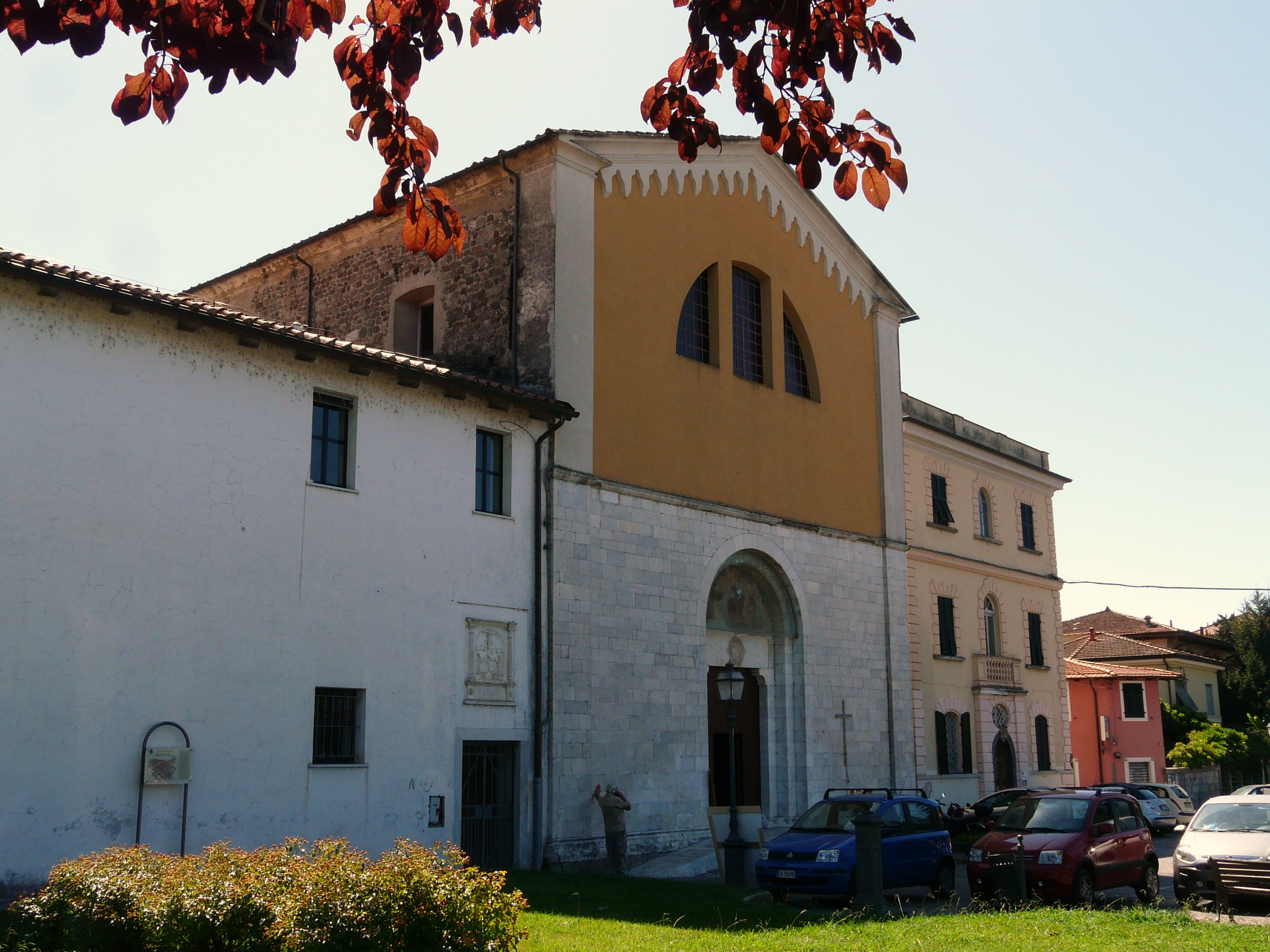
Church façade.

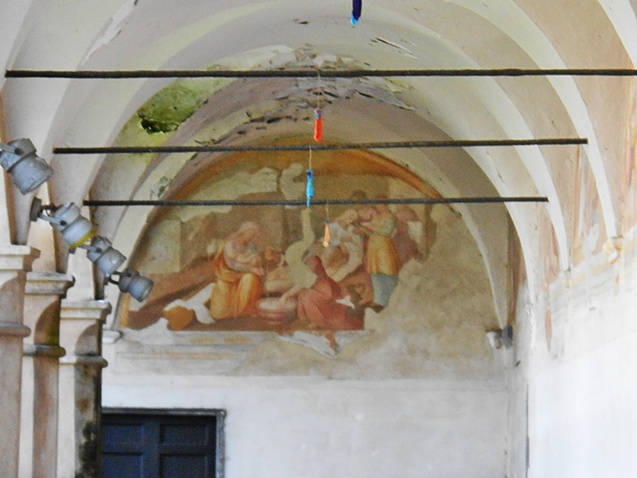
Lemmi frescos in cloister

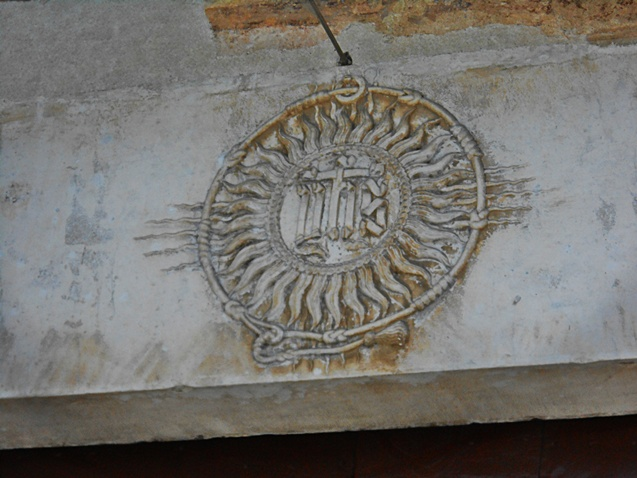
St Bernardino's Christogram enclosed in Franciscan rope.

== History ==
Tradition holds that St Francis himself founded this church in an oak forest outside of the medieval city walls. The church is near a site where St Francis of Assisi met St Dominic. At one time the site was called the German Cemetery (Cimiterio Germanico), because of the mercenary soldiers buried there. Documents note foundation of a monastery by 1238. The monastery construction began during the 13th century.

The façade was only partially finished, and only the first story sheathed in marble. The portal has a lunette with a 17th-century fresco depicting the Virgin and Child with St Francis and St Louis of Toulouse. The facade has relief with St Bernardino da Siena's Christogram: a sun and letters IHS, here framed by a rope. This recalls the adherence of the local monks to frati Minori Osservanti in 1462. The interiors were refurbished in the 17th century. Among the altarpieces in the church is an Adoration of the Shepherds (first altar on right) by Domenico Fiasella.

In the right transept is the funeral monument of cardinal Bernabò Malaspina (died 1338). In the chapel in the left of the presbytery is an Assumption of the Virgin (17th-century) attributed to Giulio Bruno. On the transept wall is also the tender funeral monument, sculpted by Giovanni di Balduccio, and dedicated to Guarnerio degli Antelminelli who died as a child, the son of the fierce condottiere Castruccio Castracani.

On the door of the sacristy is a fresco by Priamo della Quercia, brother of Jacopo della Quercia; the fresco depicts a Vir dolorum between St Clair and St Francis.

In the sacristy is a painting depicting the Madonna con Bambino, Bernardino da Siena and San Salvatore da Orta by Domenico Fiasella. On the counterfacade of the church is a large canvas depicting the Adoration of the Magi (1656) by Tommaso Clerici.

The cloister was frescoed with episodes in the Life of St Francis (15th-century) by Stefano Lemmi.
