= Settimo Vittone =

Settimo Vittone Ël Seto Viton
- Comune
- Comune di Settimo Vittone
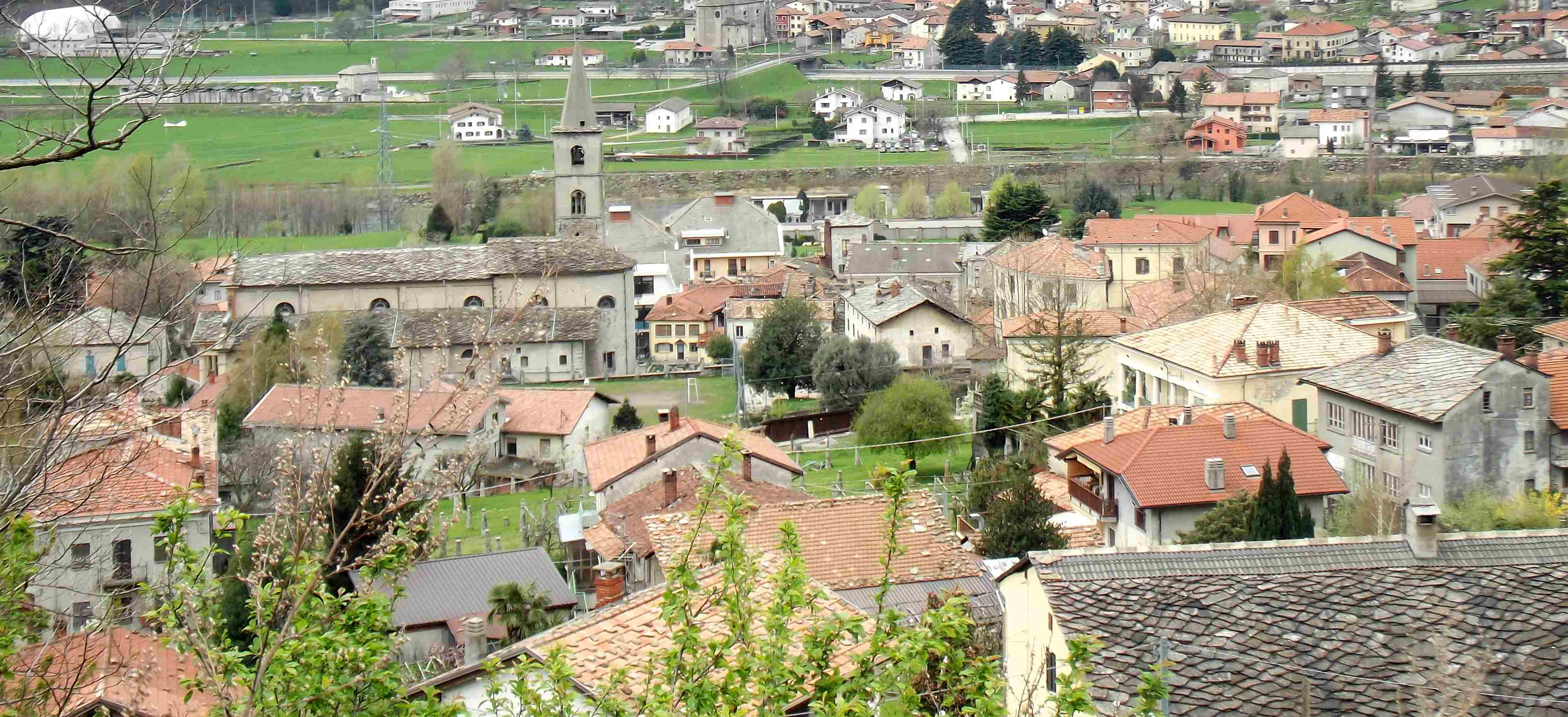
- Panorama

- Coat of arms

- Location within Italy Location within Piedmont
- Coordinates: 45°33′N 7°50′E
- Country: Italy
- Region: Piedmont
- Metropolitan city: Turin (TO)
- Frazioni: Cesnola, Cornaley, Montestrutto, Sengie, Torredaniele

Government
  - Mayor: Sabrina Noro

Area
  - Total: 23.26 km^{2} (8.98 sq mi)
- Elevation: 280 m (920 ft)

Population (30 September 2018)
  - Total: 1,535
  - Density: 65.99/km^{2} (170.9/sq mi)
- Demonym: Settimese(i)
- Time zone: UTC+1 (CET)
  - Summer (DST): UTC+2 (CEST)
- Postal code: 10010
- Dialing code: 0125
- Patron saint: St. Andrew
- Saint day: 30 November
- Website: Official website

Settimo Vittone (Piedmontese: Ël Seto Viton) is a comune (municipality) in the Metropolitan City of Turin, Piedmont, northern Italy. It is located about 50 kilometres (31 mi) north of Turin, in the Canavese traditional region.

== Main sights ==
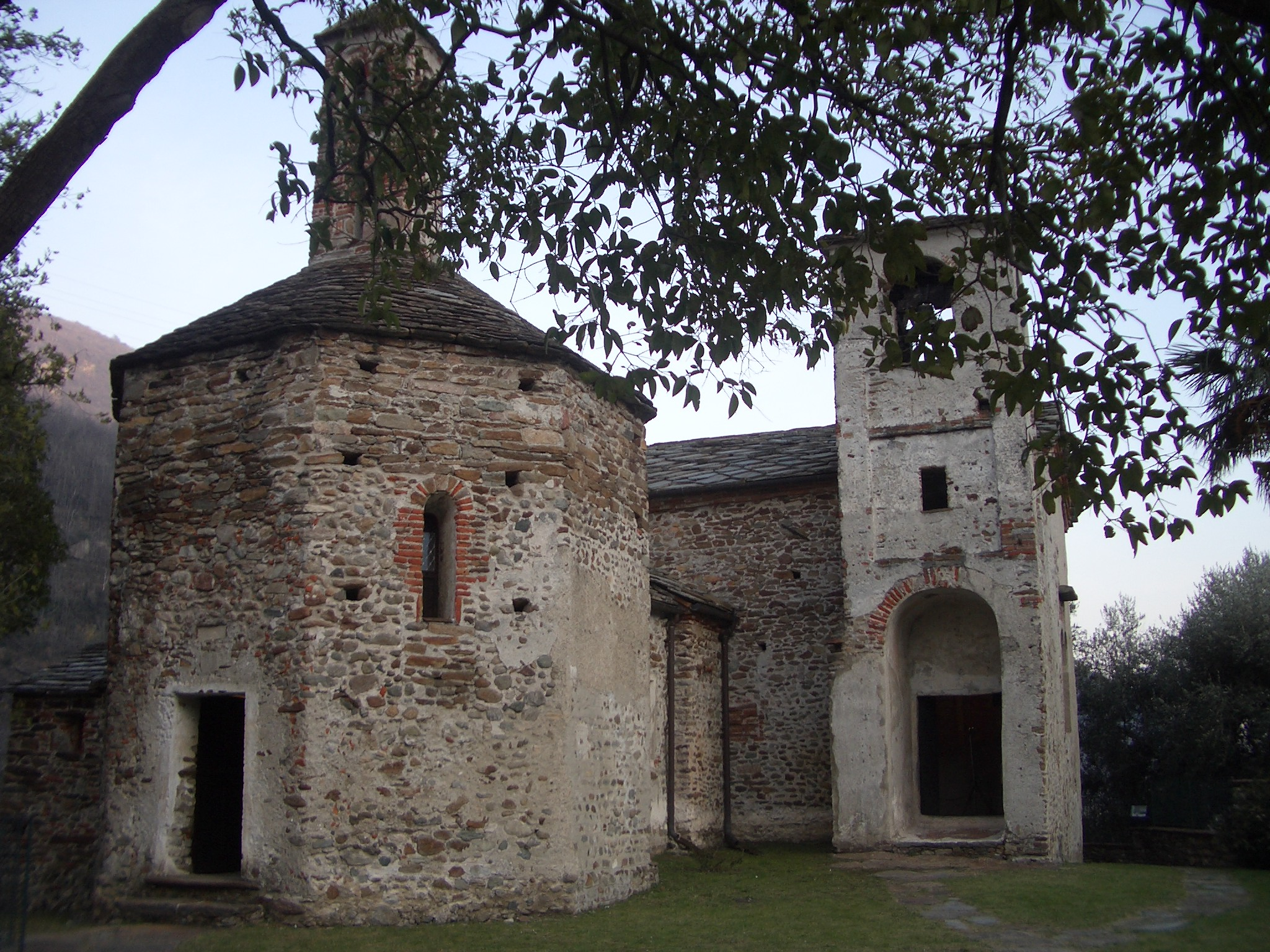
The pieve of St. Lawrence.

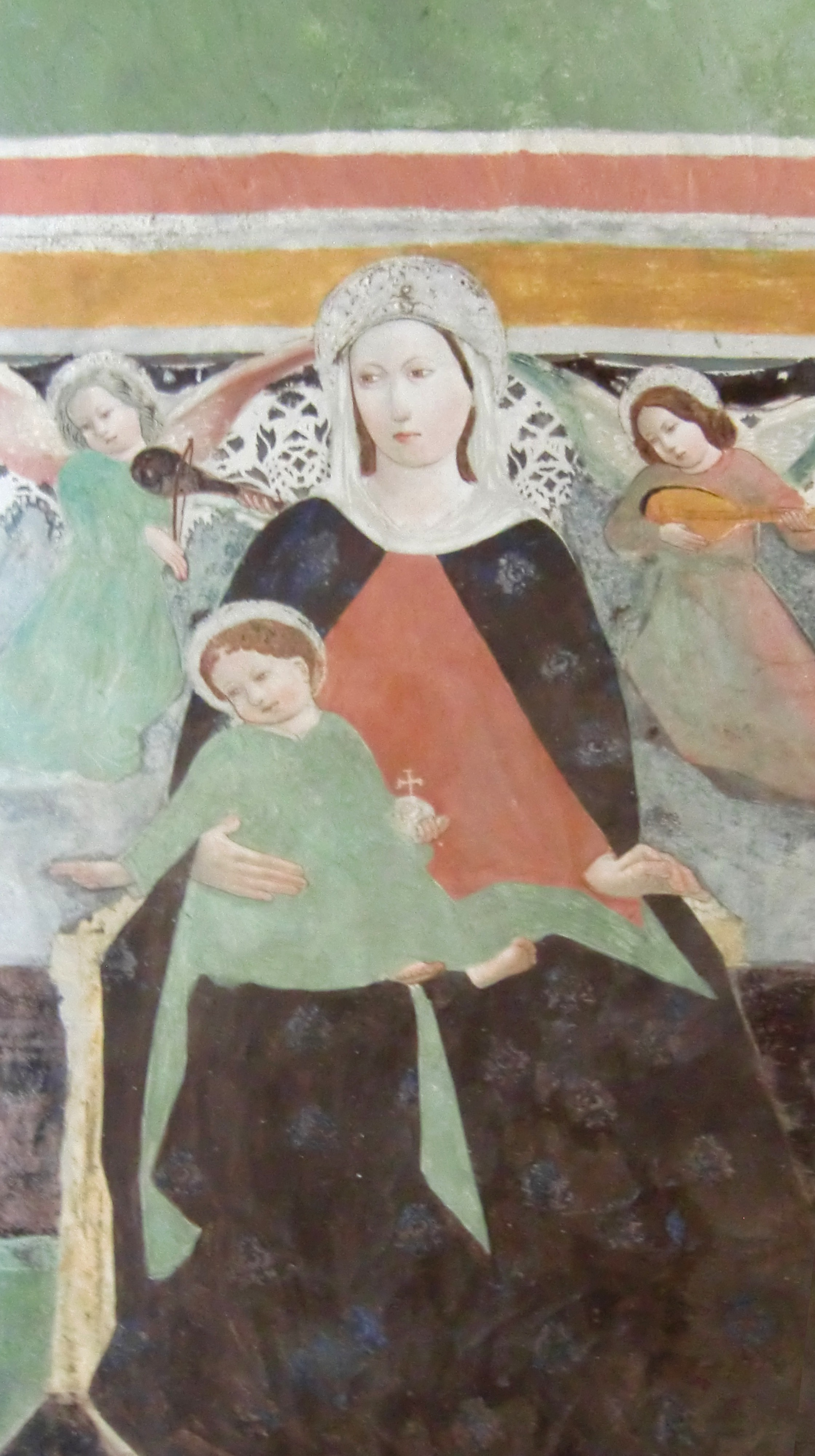
Madonna and Child fresco (detail) in the apse of St. Lawrence pleban church.

The main sights are the castle, pieve (pleban church), and the late 9th-century baptistery of St Lawrence (who as bishop of Autun was dear to the Frank people). The structures are a rare examples of pre-Romanesque architecture in Piedmont, often featuring a bell tower and a rectangular apse. It is home to numerous frescoes, dating from the mid-11th to the late 15th centuries. Settimo has a derivation from septimum lapidem from the city of Ivrea on the Consular Roman road of the Gauls. Here are found the ruins of the ancient fortress, which legend says was built by Attone Anscario, Ansgarda's brother, queen of Franks and here buried. In the 14th century Savoy took control of all the area and incorporated it to their Duchy; the ancient Lords of the place (the Enrico) were nominated Counts. In the 16th century the Castle-Fortress was destroyed and replaced by a new Villa-palace called "New Castle".

Montestrutto Castle and Cesnola Castle are located in the comune. The Colma di Mombarone mountain is also located nearby.
