= Fortress of Sarzanello =

Fortezza di Sarzanello
- Part of Castelli della Val di Magra
- Sarzana, Liguria, in Italy
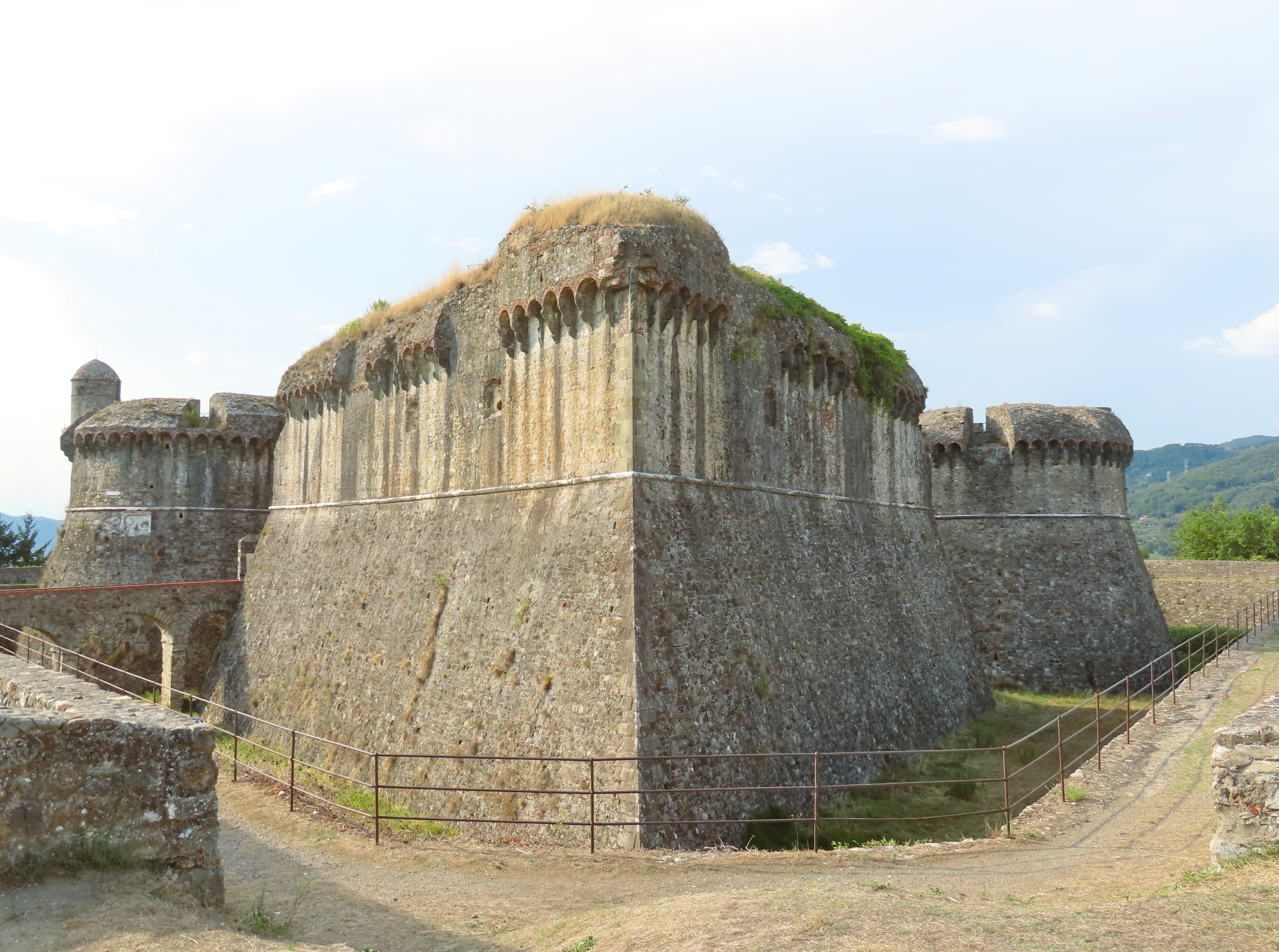
- Ravelin of the fortress

Site information
- Operator: Comune di Sarzana
- Open to the public: yes
- Condition: Well preserved

Location
- Coordinates: 44.1151°N 9.9712°E

The fortress of Sarzanello is a military fortification on the Sarzanello hill, near Sarzana, in province of La Spezia, Italy, above the Val di Magra. Since December 2014 it is managed by the Ministry of Culture.

== Description ==
The fortress has "three squat circular towers" that do not come up higher than the walls, a "central square tower, and a triangular protobastion".

Two distinct building elements are visible:

- the castle proper, the main part of the fortification, has a triangular plan with three bastions at the top;
- a huge ravelin in the form of a triangular fortified embankment opposite the castle, to which it is connected by a bridge.

Access to the fortress is by crossing the stone bridge, which crosses the wide and deep fortified moat.

== History ==
As early as the 4th century Luni had begun declining, and its inhabitants began migrating to the surrounding hills for safety. This expanded existing villages and started new villages (Nicola, Ortonovo, Castelnuovo Magra, Ameglia); the Sarzanello hill itself was populated by exiles who settled there around the Bishop's residence. A military structure on the hill is mentioned for the first time in 963, in a document from the Emperor Otto I; it grants the possession of six castra, including that of "de Sarzano", to the Diocese of Luni.

Between 1076 and 1080 it is referenced as the curtis of the emperor Frederick Barbarossa, and in 1191 as the curtis of Henry VI.

=== From Castruccio Castracani to the Genoese Republic ===
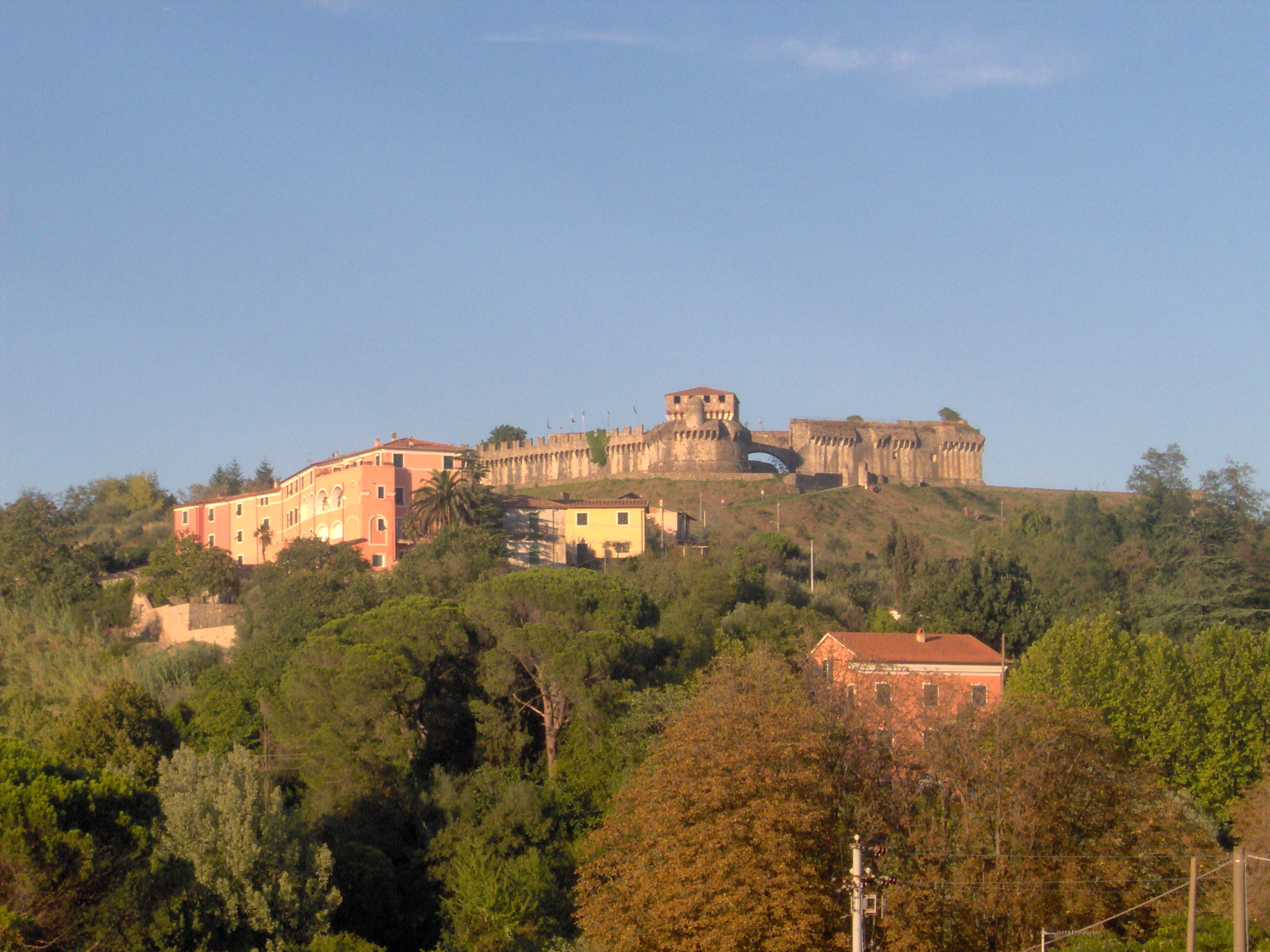
The fortress atop Sarzanello hill

Between 1314 and 1328 the imperial vicar Castruccio Castracani was plenipotentiary of the area; he supposedly was the model for Niccolò Machiavelli "Prince". Any changes he made to the structure can no longer be discerned. In 1421 the Genoese Tomaso Fregoso ordered changes and restorations to the fortress; more were done until the Florentines took over.

Lorenzo de' Medici had the city fortified and erected the citadel—after first destroying its predecessor—updating the structure for modern warfare. After having fortified the city, erecting the Fortezza Firmafede (the city's citadel), having previously destroyed it, the Medici decided to transform the old fortress on the hill and adapt it to the new war needs. The architects Francesco di Giovanni and Luca del Caprina designed the new structure which completely replaced the previous one. It was not yet finished when in 1494, two years after the death of Lorenzo, his son Piero the Unfortunate handed it over to the French.

Once the construction of the fortress with its three roundels was completed, construction of the ravelin began, which probably incorporated the ancient tower of the castrum. This new structure protected the entrance to the fortress and prevented this side from being hit by artillery from the hill to the south-east, a place called the Fortino, where another line of defense was soon set up. When that was done the fortress reached its current state.

=== From Napoleon to today ===
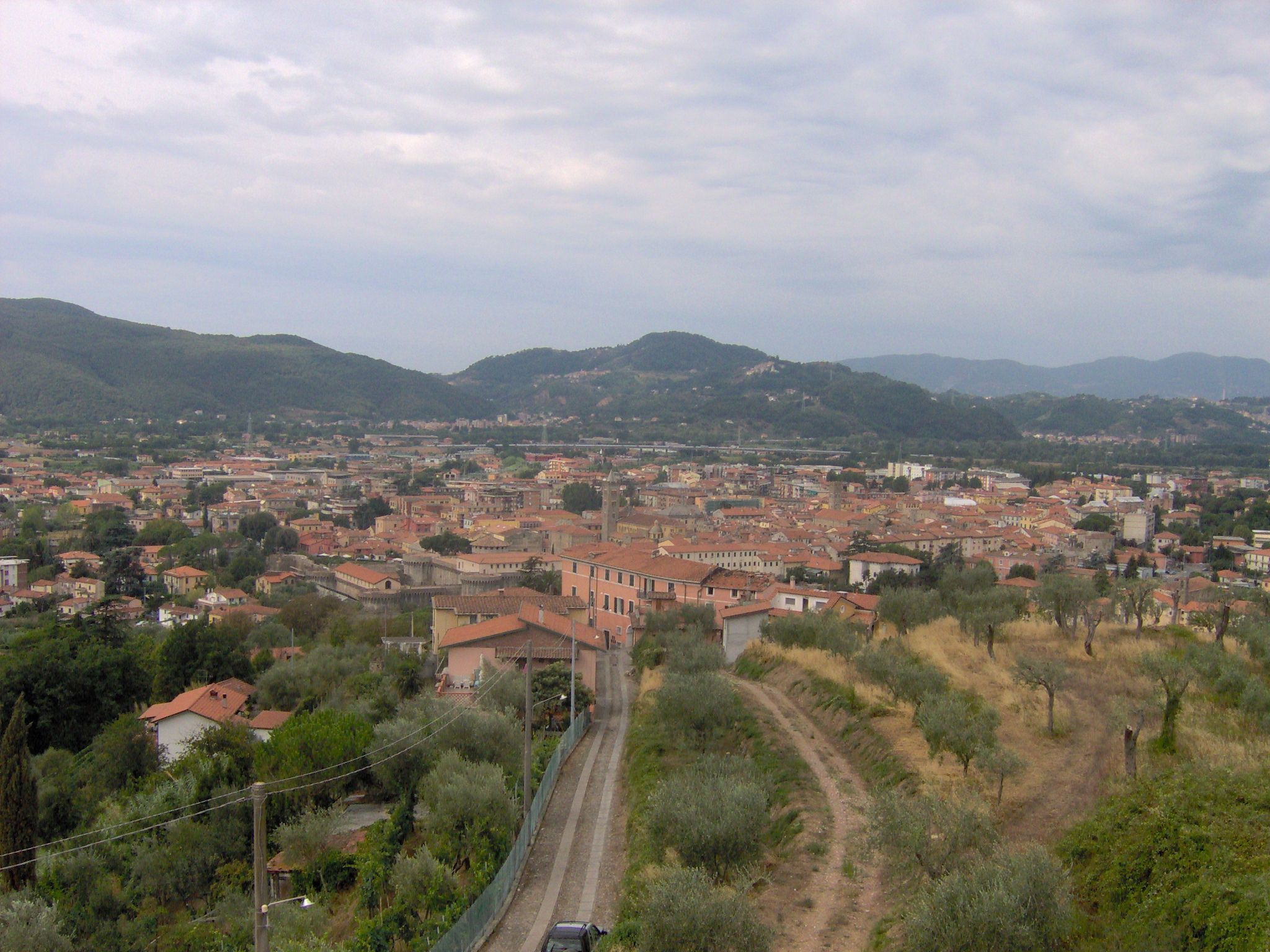
Sarzana viewed from the fortress

In 1747, during the War of the Austrian Succession, the soldiers of Maria Theresa of Austria led by German general Wocter, unsuccessfully tried to take the fortress. Since the nearby town of Sarzanello had provided aid to the Austrians, the government of Genoa ordered the demolition of the 120 houses that made up the village, including the ancient church. In 1748, the inhabitants were forced to move to the southernmost area, the new Sarzanello.

== Access ==
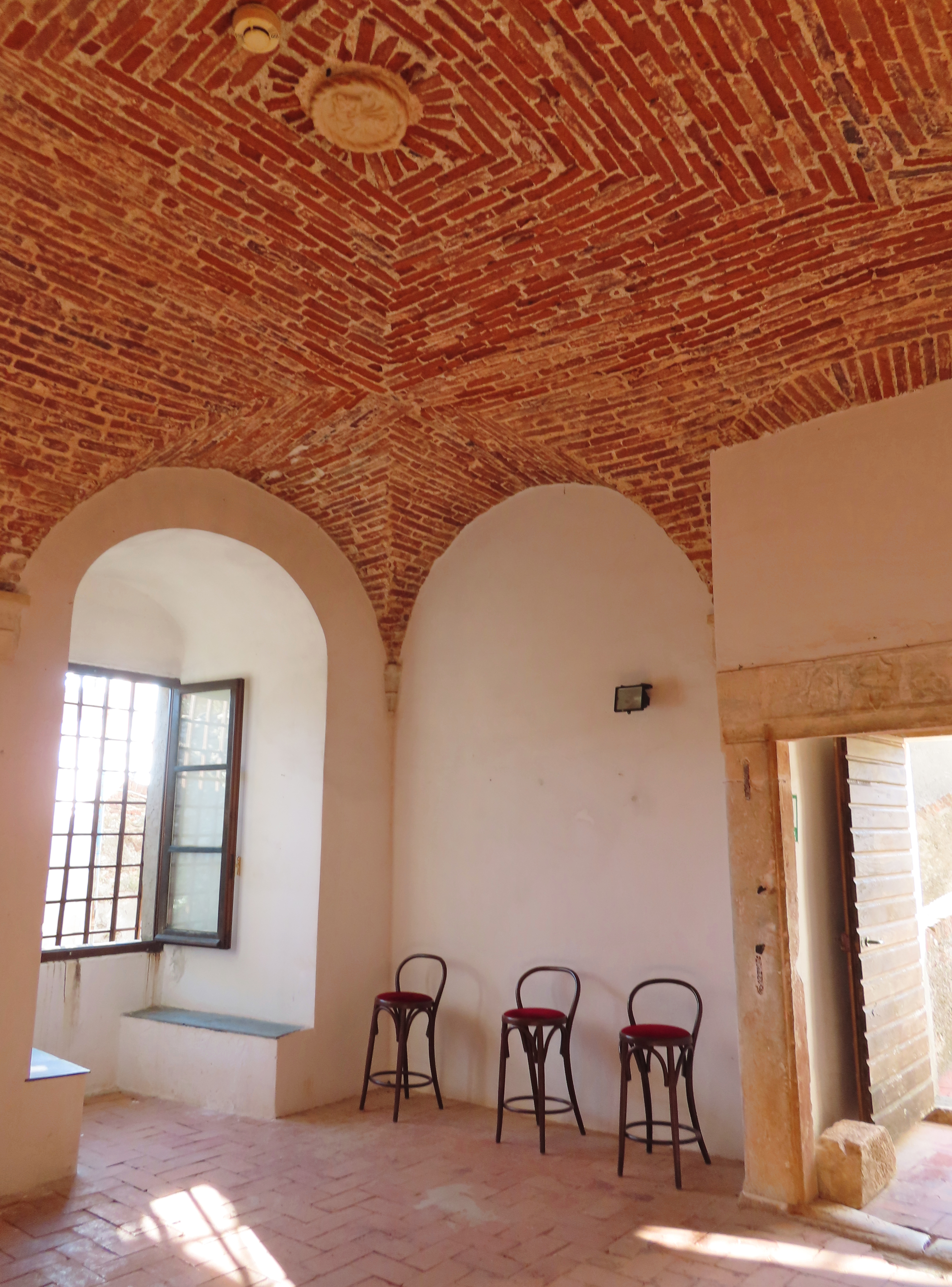
Kitchen of the commander

There is a third access road and is represented by a pedestrian walkway called the Montata di Sarzanello, recommended to tourists for its scenery. The hill can be walked from Via San Francesco.
