= Borgo Mantovano =

Borgo Mantovano Borch Mantuan (Lombard)
- Comune
- Comune di Borgo Mantovano
- Location within Italy Location within Lombardy
- Coordinates: 45°3′26.96″N 11°7′31.69″E
- Country: Italy
- Region: Lombardy
- Province: Province of Mantua (MN)

Area
  - Total: 41.17 km^{2} (15.90 sq mi)

Population (31 December 2016)
  - Total: 5,619
  - Density: 136.5/km^{2} (353.5/sq mi)
- Time zone: UTC+1 (CET)
  - Summer (DST): UTC+2 (CEST)
- Dialing code: 0386
- Website: Official website

Borgo Mantovano (Lower Mantovano: Borch Mantuan) is a comune (municipality) in the Province of Mantua in the Italian region Lombardy.

It was established on 1 January 2018 by the merger of the municipalities of Pieve di Coriano, Revere and Villa Poma.
