= Cesnola Castle =

Castle in Piedmont, Italy

- Castello di Cesnola
- Settimo Vittone, Piedmont, Italy
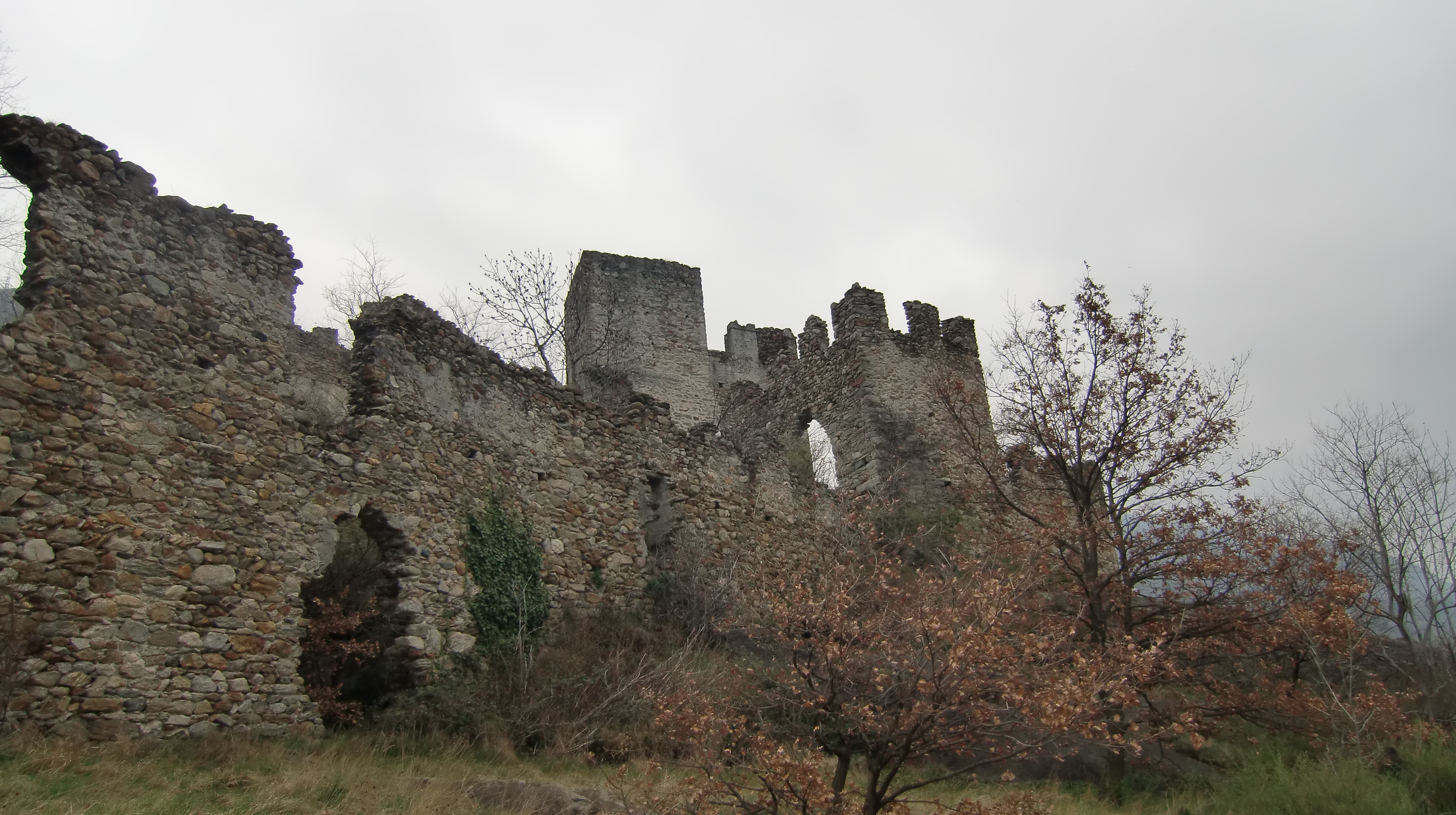
- Cesnola Castle in 2011

Site information
- Type: Castle

Location
- Coordinates: 45°33′44.07″N 7°49′42.68″E

Cesnola Castle (Italian: Castello di Cesnola) is a castle located in Settimo Vittone, Piedmont, Italy.

== History ==
There is little historical information about the origins of the castle, which likely dates back to the 11th century.

The first expansions of the castle took place between the 11th and 13th centuries, when the lords of Castelletto were the feudal lords of Cesnola. Among them, a certain Pantalone of Castelletto, canon of Ivrea in 1439, is known. In the 14th century, the lineage of the Castelletto family merged through Battistina of Castelletto, who married into the family of the lords of Settimo Vittone, the (H)Enrico, who became the counts of Cesnola.

The castle was partially destroyed in the early 16th century, when Charles III, Duke of Savoy ordered its demolition.

Having undergone several modifications, it belonged to the Palma di Cesnola family starting from 1789, after they were granted the fief of Cesnola by Victor Amadeus III.

In the 21st century, the castle lies in a state of abandonment.

== Description ==
The castle stands on a rocky spur along the left bank of the Dora Baltea river at the entry of the Aosta Valley.
