= Mastro Guglielmo =

Anonymous painter

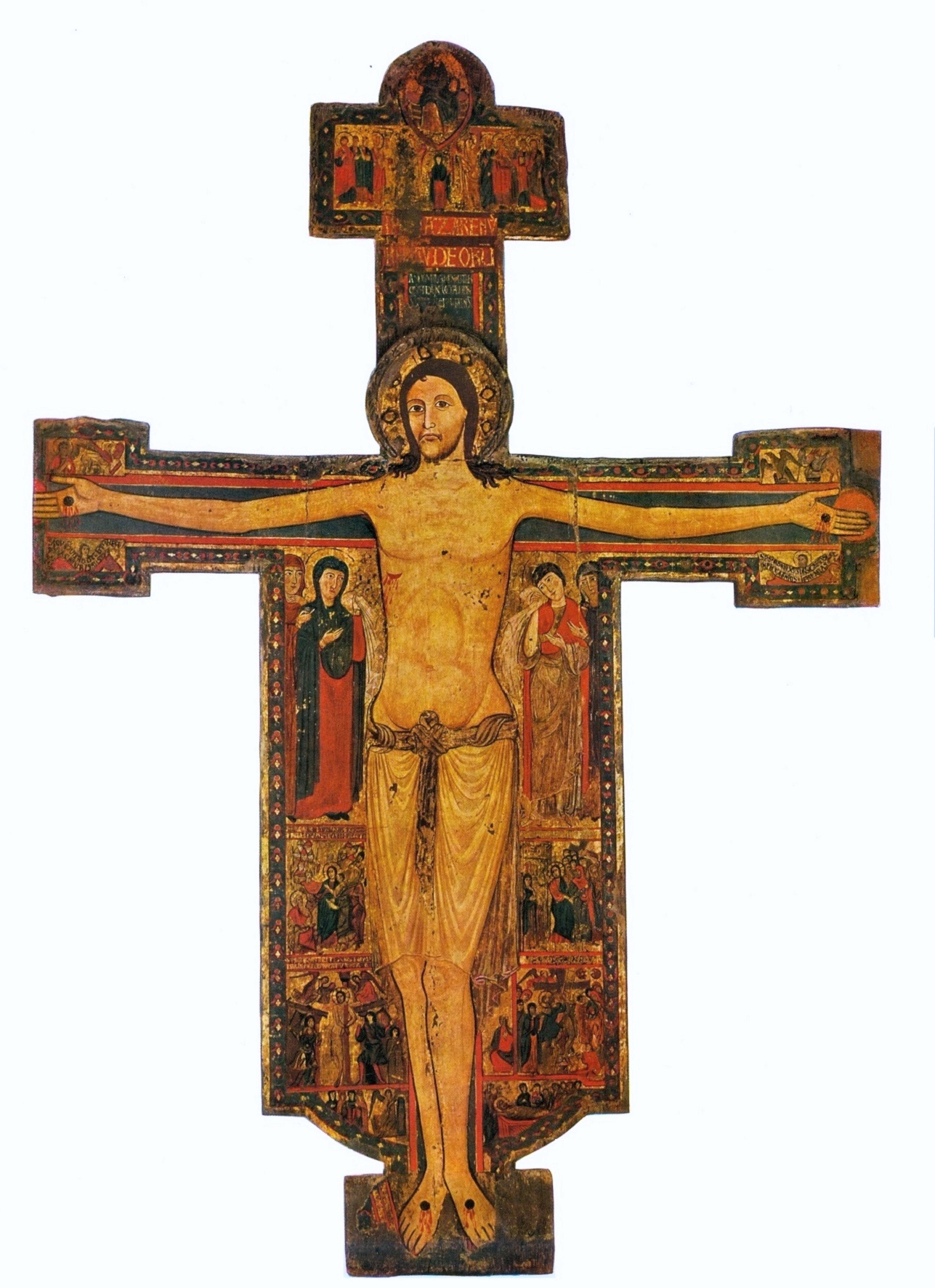
Crucifix by Mastro Guglielmo (1138)

Mastro Guglielmo was the Italian master of Byzantine painting of the early 12th century who signed in 1138 crucifix kept and exhibited in the co-cathedral of Santa Maria Assunta in Sarzana on the coast of the Ligurian Sea.

Some miniatures also are attributed to him (based on stylistic considerations).

== Crucifix from Sarzana ==
The crucifix from Sarzana by Mastro Guglielmo is a figure of the resurrected Christ painted in tempera on canvas, attached to a cross made of chestnut wood and is also the first known example of an iconography of the Christus triumphans typology. According to the interpretation of the Italian art historian Piero Torriti, the Jesus figure shown represents "an expanded grandeur, a strong search for life and freedom of movement that seems to dissolve the rigid oriental forms".

Crucifix is signed above the head of Christ: "ANNO MILLENO CENTENO TER / QUOQUE DENO OCTAVO PIN / XIT GUGLIELMO ET HAEC METRA FINXIT" This text states that the artist not only painted the painting but also wrote poetry. These poems were on the lower panels depicting the Passion of Christ, but have become almost completely illegible.

One of the more famous copies of Mastro Guglielmo's crucifix can be found in the church of Heiligenkreuz Abbey, in the Lower Austrian municipality of the same name in the middle of the Vienna Woods: this was made by the Italian artist Renato Manfredi in 1980–1981 as part of the renovation of the altar area of the church and hung above the altar on Good Friday (17 April) in 1981.
