= Pieve =

Rural church in Italy

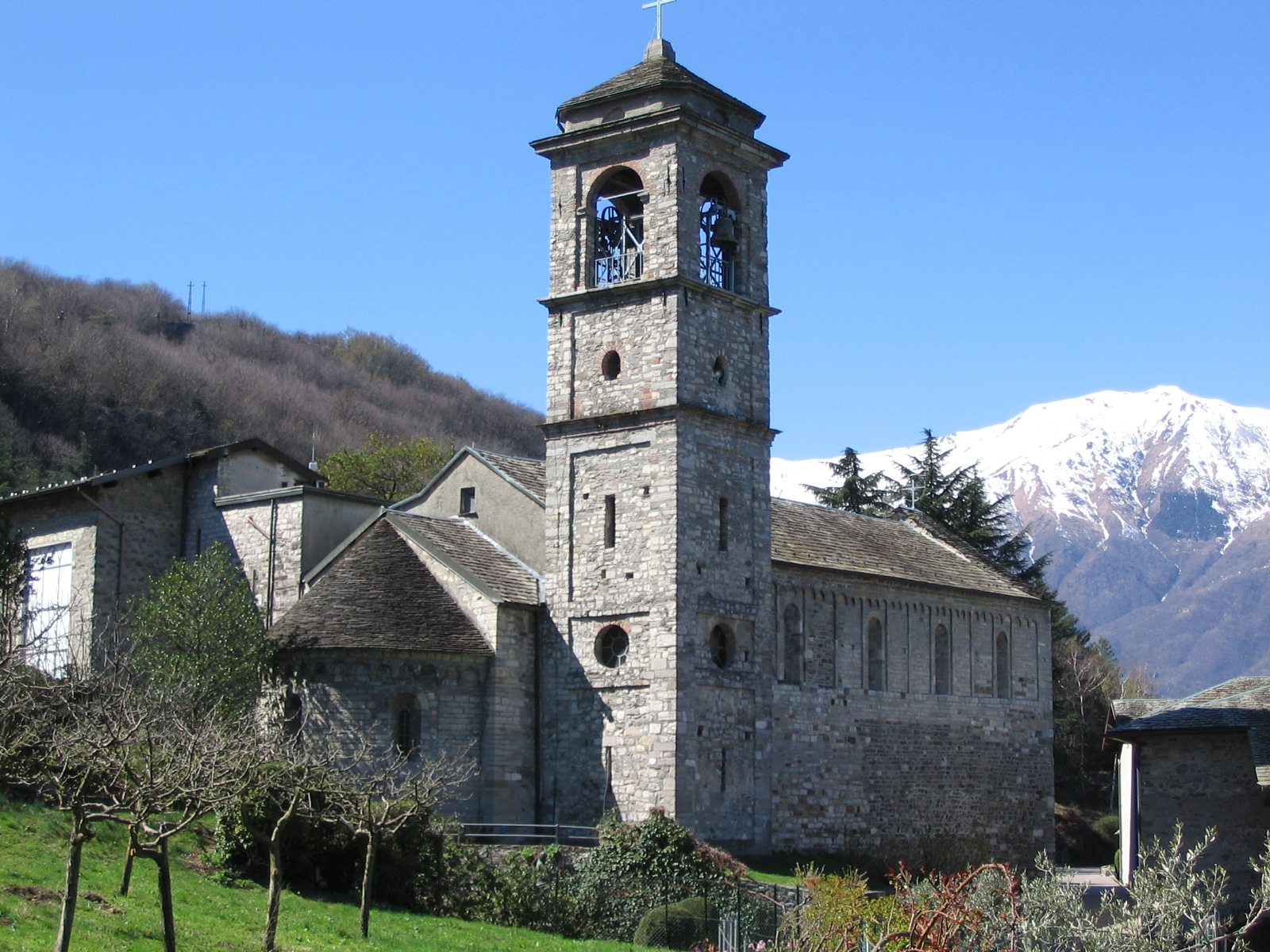
The pieve of Piona

In Italy in the Middle Ages, a pieve (Italian pronunciation: [ˈpjɛːve], Corsican: [ˈpjɛvɛ]; Latin: plebe; pl.: pievi) was a rural church with a baptistery, which governed smaller churches in the district. Pieve is also an Italian and Corsican term signifying the medieval ecclesiastical/administrative territory of its the mother church. It has thus become a common component of both place names and of the names of churches.

The Italian word pieve is descended from Latin plebs which, after the expansion of Christianity in Italy, was applied to the community of baptized people. Many pievi began to appear in the 5th century, as Christianity expanded in the rural areas outside the main cities. The term plebs was first used to refer to churches in this context near the end of the seventh century.

In the 9th-10th centuries, pievi were often designed with bell towers.

== Churches in Italy ==
Churches in Italy described as a pieve include:

- Pieve di Sant'Andrea (Cercina), Tuscany
- Pieve di Sant'Andrea (Pistoia), in Pistoia, Province of Pistioa, Tuscany
- Pieve di Sant'Andrea, Sarzana, Province of La Spezia, Liguria
- Pieve di Sant'Andrea (Stignano) in Buggiano, Province of Pistioa, Tuscany

== Places in Italy ==
Places in Italy called Pieve include:

- Città della Pieve, a commune in the Province of Perugia, Umbria
- Pieve a Nievole, a commune in the Province of Pistoia, Tuscany
- Pieve Albignola, a commune in the Province of Pavia, Lombardy
- Pieve d'Alpago, a commune in the Province of Belluno, Veneto
- Pieve del Cairo, a commune in the Province of Pavia, Lombardy
- Pieve di Bono, a commune in the Province of Trento, Trentino-Alto Adige/Südtirol
- Pieve di Cadore, a commune in the Province of Belluno, Veneto
- Pieve di Cento, a commune in the Province of Bologna, Emilia-Romagna
- Pieve di Coriano, a commune in the Province of Mantua, Lombardy
- Pieve di Ledro, a former commune in the Province of Trento, Trentino-Alto Adige/Südtirol
- Pieve di Livinallongo, seat of the commune of Livinallongo del Col di Lana in the Province of Belluno, Veneto
- Pieve di Soligo, a commune in the Province of Treviso, Veneto
- Pieve di Teco, a commune in the Province of Imperia, Liguria
- Pieve d'Olmi, a commune in the Province of Cremona, Lombardy
- Pieve Emanuele, a commune in the Province of Milan, Lombardy
- Pieve Fissiraga, a commune in the Province of Lodi, Lombardy
- Pieve Fosciana, a commune in the Province of Lucca, Tuscany
- Pieve Ligure, a commune in the Province of Genoa, Liguria
- Pieve Porto Morone, a commune in the Province of Pavia, Lombardy
- Pieve San Giacomo, a commune in the Province of Cremona, Lombardy
- Pieve Santo Stefano, a commune in the Province of Arezzo, Tuscany
- Pieve Tesino, a commune in the Province of Trento, Trentino-Alto Adige/Südtirol
- Pieve Torina, a commune in the Province of Macerata, Marche
- Pieve Vergonte, a commune in the Province of Verbano Cusio Ossola, Piedmont
