= Sarzana =

Municipality in Liguria, Italy

- Comune
- Città di Sarzana
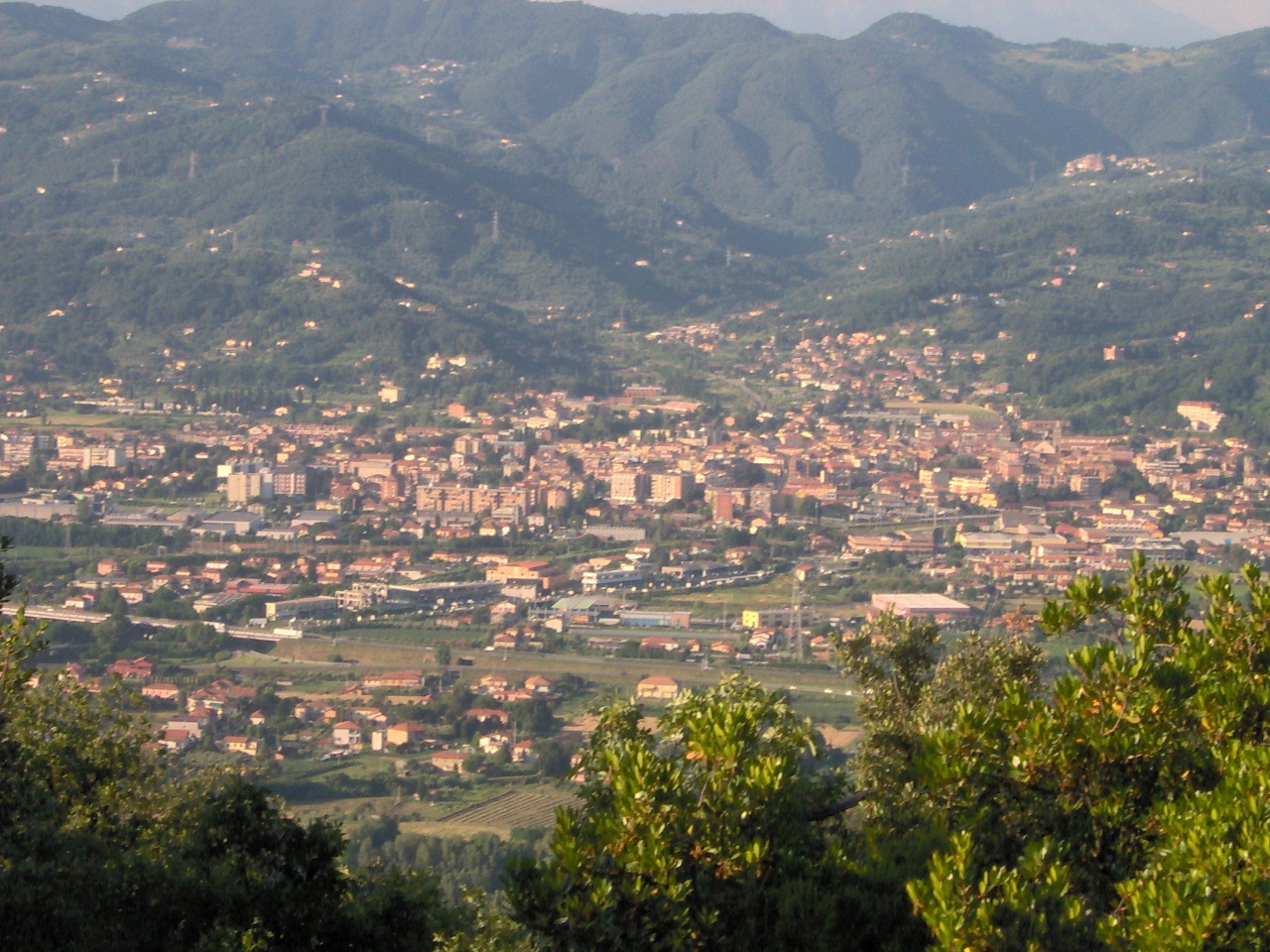

- Flag Coat of arms

- Location within Italy Location within Liguria
- Coordinates: 44°07′N 09°58′E
- Country: Italy
- Region: Liguria
- Province: La Spezia (SP)
- Frazioni: Marinella di Sarzana, Falcinello, Sarzanello, San Lazzaro

Government
  - Mayor: Cristina Ponzanelli

Area
  - Total: 34 km^{2} (13 sq mi)
- Elevation: 21 m (69 ft)

Population (31 December 2016)
  - Total: 22,104
  - Density: 650/km^{2} (1,700/sq mi)
- Demonym: Sarzanesi
- Time zone: UTC+1 (CET)
  - Summer (DST): UTC+2 (CEST)
- Postal code: 19038
- Dialing code: 0187
- Patron saint: St. Andrew
- Saint day: 30 November
- Website: Official website

Sarzana (Italian: [sarˈdzaːna], Emilian: [sarˈzana]; Ligurian: Sarzann-a) is a town, comune (municipality) and former short-lived Catholic bishopric in the Province of La Spezia, Liguria, Italy. It is 15 kilometres (9 mi) east of La Spezia, on the railway to Pisa, at the point where the railway to Parma diverges to the north. In 2023, it had a population of 21,786.

== History ==
The position of Sarzana, at the entrance to the valley of the Magra (ancient Macra), the boundary between Etruria and Liguria in Roman times, gave it military importance in the Middle Ages. The first mention of the city is found in 983 in a diploma of Otto I; in 1202 the episcopal see was transferred from the ancient Luni, 5 kilometres (3 mi) southeast, to Sarzana.

Sarzana, owing to its position, changed masters more than once, belonging first to Pisa, then to Florence, then to the Banco di S. Giorgio of Genoa and from 1572 to dogal Genoa itself.

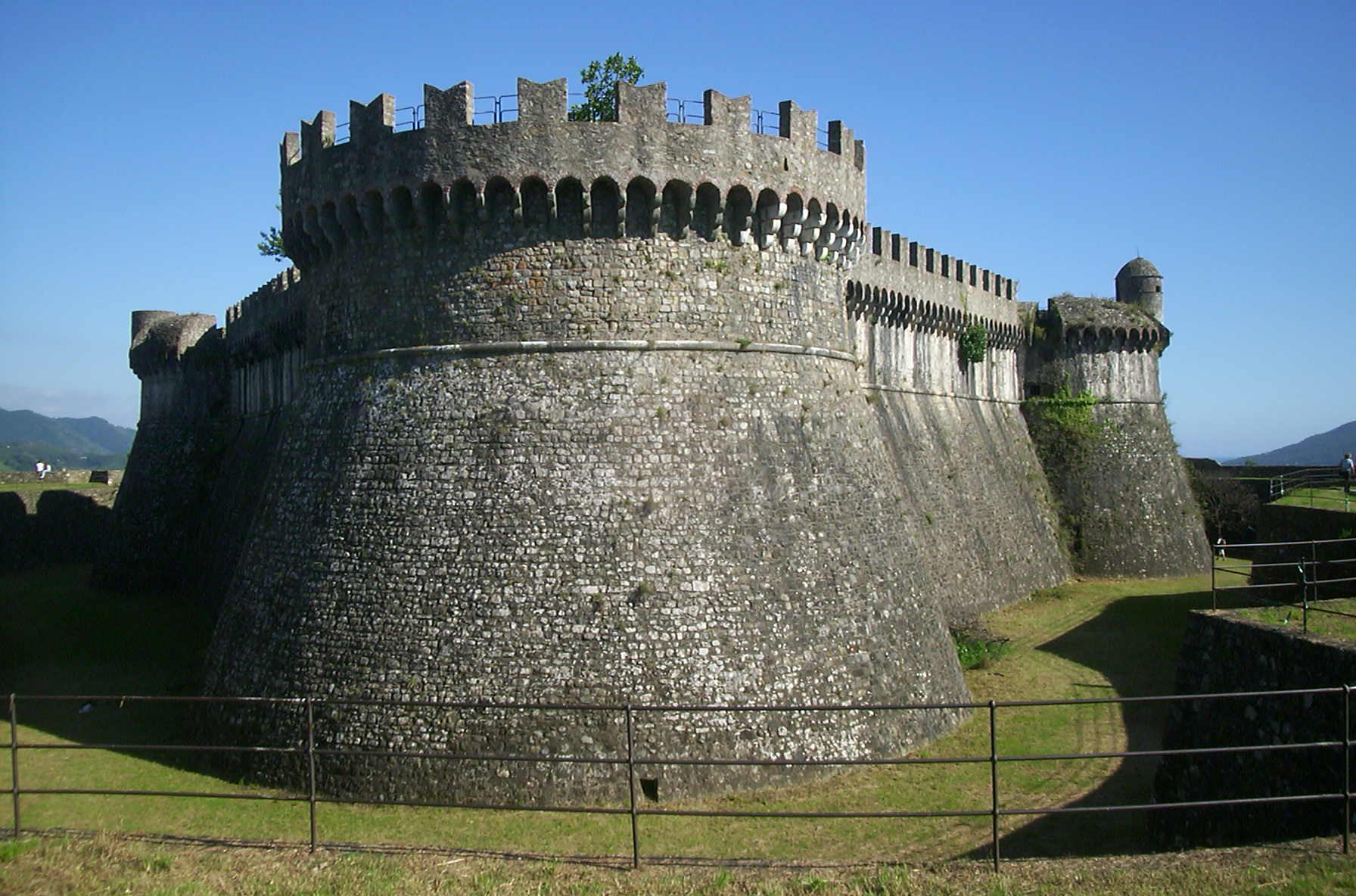
The fortress of Sarzana

A fortress to protect the town stood since at least the tenth century; it was built in its current shape under orders from Lorenzo de' Medici. In 1814 it was assigned to the Kingdom of Sardinia, the frontier between Liguria and Tuscany being now made to run between it and Carrara.

In 1921 Sarzana was the scene of fights (Fatti di Sarzana) between the population and Mussolini's Fascist squads. During them, a small group of Carabinieri and, later, simple citizens opposed and pushed back some 300 armed Fascists who had come to devastate the town, resulting in 18 dead and about 30 injured.

During the German occupation of Italy in World War II, Sarzana was a centre of partisan resistance.

== Ecclesiastical history ==
The Diocese of Sarzana was established on 4 August 1975, on territory reassigned from the suppressed Roman Catholic Diocese of Luni–Sarzana. It was immediately joined in personal union (aeque principaliter) with the bishopric of Brugnato and diocese of La Spezia from 4 August 1975 until their merger on 30 September 1986.

On 30 September 1986 it was suppressed, its territory and titles being merged into the Diocese of La Spezia–Sarzana–Brugnato, to which the bishop was appointed.

Its only incumbent as suffragan Bishop of Sarzana was

- Siro Silvestri (1975.09.03 – 1986.09.30), also last Bishop of Brugnato (Italy) (1975.09.03 – 1986.09.30) and last Bishop of La Spezia (Italy) (1975.09.03 – 1986.09.30); previously Bishop of Foligno (Italy) (1955.07.21 – 1975.09.03); later first Bishop of La Spezia–Sarzana–Brugnato (Italy) (1986.09.30 – resigned 1989.12.07), died 1997.06.14.

== Main sights ==
- the former Sarzana Cathedral: a white marble Gothic-style church built 1355–1474. It houses two elaborately sculptured altars of the latter period.
- Citadel of Sarzana; fortress initially built by Pisans, was demolished and re-erected by Lorenzo de' Medici.
- Castle of Sarzana: located on the hill of Sarzanello, at the site of fortress from as early as emperor Otto I. The castle was rebuilt or enlarged by the condottiero Castruccio Castracani, and later became the residence of the bishops of Luni.
- Pieve of Sant'Andrea: 10th–11th century parish church, and rebuilt in 1579, and has 16-century portal. It houses 14th–15th century marble statuary, a Vocation of Saints by Domenico Fiasella, and a dodecagonal baptismal font.
- San Francesco: documented from 1238 and, according to tradition, founded by Saint Francis himself. It houses the funerary monument (1328) of Castruccio Castracani's son, by Giovanni di Balduccio; the tomb of bishop Bernabò Malaspina; and a frescoed lunette attributed to Priamo della Quercia.
- Palazzo del Capitano: designed by Giuliano da Maiano (1472), but now entirely altered.

== Notable locals ==
Sarzana was the birthplace of Tommaso Parentucelli, the future Pope Nicholas V, in 1397 a son of local doctor Bartolomeo Parentucelli. A branch of the Cadolingi di Borgonuovo family, Lords of Fucecchio in Tuscany from the 10th century onwards, which had acquired the name of Buonaparte, had settled near Sarzana before 1264. In 1512, a member of the family (Francesco Buonaparte, who died in 1540) permanently took up residence in Ajaccio, becoming the founder of the Corsican line of Buonapartes and hence a direct forebear of Sebastiano Nicola Buonaparte. He in turn was the great-grandfather of the emperor Napoleon I (who was born in 1769 in Corsica).

== International relations ==
=== Twin towns – sister cities ===
Sarzana is twinned with:

- Villefranche-de-Rouergue, France
- Eger, Hungary

== Climate ==
The Köppen climate classification subtype for this climate is "Csa" (Mediterranean climate). The annual average temperature is 15.42 °C (59.8 °F), the hottest month in August is 24.23 °C (75.6 °F), and the coldest month is 7.72 °C (45.9 °F) in January. The annual precipitation is 950.01 millimetres (37.40 in), of which November is the wettest with 136.73 millimetres (5.38 in), while July is the driest with only 21.45 millimetres (0.84 in).

Climate data for Sarzana (1991–2020, extremes 1970–present)
Month	Jan	Feb	Mar	Apr	May	Jun	Jul	Aug	Sep	Oct	Nov	Dec	Year
Record high °C (°F)	18.4 (65.1)	20.0 (68.0)	24.0 (75.2)	26.2 (79.2)	32.4 (90.3)	37.0 (98.6)	36.6 (97.9)	38.3 (100.9)	34.2 (93.6)	29.4 (84.9)	24.4 (75.9)	19.2 (66.6)	38.3 (100.9)
Mean daily maximum °C (°F)	11.3 (52.3)	12.1 (53.8)	15.0 (59.0)	18.0 (64.4)	22.2 (72.0)	26.2 (79.2)	29.0 (84.2)	29.5 (85.1)	25.3 (77.5)	20.5 (68.9)	15.8 (60.4)	12.4 (54.3)	19.8 (67.6)
Daily mean °C (°F)	7.7 (45.9)	8.0 (46.4)	10.7 (51.3)	13.6 (56.5)	17.6 (63.7)	21.3 (70.3)	23.9 (75.0)	24.2 (75.6)	20.3 (68.5)	16.5 (61.7)	12.3 (54.1)	8.9 (48.0)	15.4 (59.7)
Mean daily minimum °C (°F)	4.0 (39.2)	4.0 (39.2)	6.5 (43.7)	9.2 (48.6)	13.0 (55.4)	16.5 (61.7)	18.8 (65.8)	19.0 (66.2)	15.4 (59.7)	12.4 (54.3)	8.7 (47.7)	5.2 (41.4)	11.1 (52.0)
Record low °C (°F)	−9.0 (15.8)	−5.0 (23.0)	−4.9 (23.2)	−3.6 (25.5)	3.8 (38.8)	7.8 (46.0)	10.4 (50.7)	7.6 (45.7)	6.0 (42.8)	0.0 (32.0)	−3.6 (25.5)	−6.6 (20.1)	−9.0 (15.8)
Average precipitation mm (inches)	80.3 (3.16)	72.1 (2.84)	79.4 (3.13)	75.0 (2.95)	57.2 (2.25)	52.9 (2.08)	21.5 (0.85)	34.0 (1.34)	98.0 (3.86)	134.0 (5.28)	136.7 (5.38)	109.3 (4.30)	950.01 (37.40)
Average precipitation days (≥ 1.0 mm)	6.97	6.33	6.82	6.59	5.57	4.75	2.14	3.19	5.86	9.00	9.34	9.30	75.86
Average relative humidity (%)	71.8	70.2	68.7	68.8	68.5	68.7	66.8	67.2	69.1	73.9	74.6	72.8	70.1
Average dew point °C (°F)	1.3 (34.3)	1.2 (34.2)	3.4 (38.1)	6.2 (43.2)	10.6 (51.1)	13.9 (57.0)	16.1 (61.0)	16.3 (61.3)	13.3 (55.9)	10.8 (51.4)	6.3 (43.3)	2.5 (36.5)	8.5 (47.3)
Source 1: NOAA (Dew Point 1981-2010)
Source 2: Servizio Meteorologico

== See also ==
- Oratory of San Girolamo, Sarzana
- Crucifix by Mastro Guglielmo

== Sources and external links ==
- Media related to Sarzana at Wikimedia Commons
- GCatholic: Diocese of Sarzana, Italy
