= Fortezza Firmafede =

Fortezza di Sarzanello
- Part of Castelli della Val di Magra
- Sarzana, Liguria, in Italy
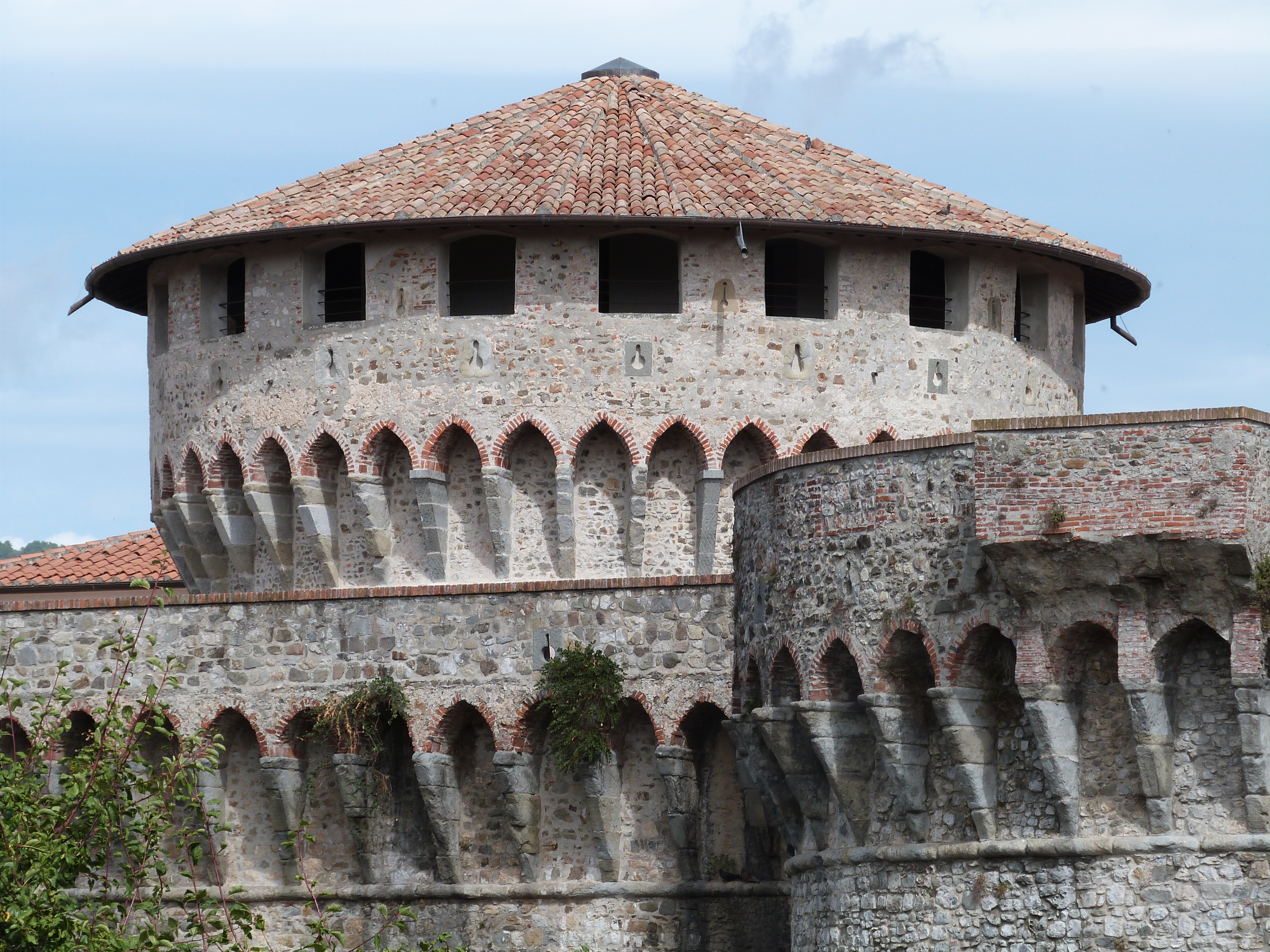
- Round tower of the fortress

Site information
- Owner: Ministry of Culture
- Open to the public: yes
- Condition: Well preserved

Location
- Coordinates: 44.1121°N 9.9646°E

The fortezza Firmafede, also named La Cittadella or Fortezza di Sarzana, is a military fortification in Sarzana, in the Province of La Spezia, Liguria, Italy.

== History ==
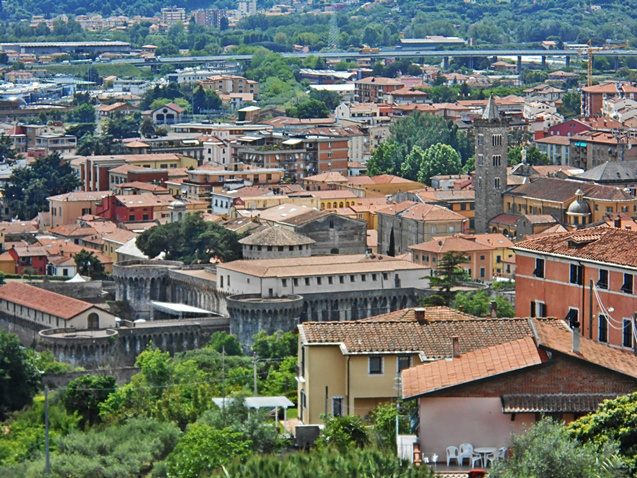
Fortress in the center of Sarzana

The Citadella was the town's first military fortification; along with the city walls it was built with the help of the town's Pisan allies. Important changes and improvements to its defensive systems were made in 1324 by Castruccio Castracani, but the Florentines, led by Lorenzo de' Medici, destroyed it in 1487. It was rebuilt between 1487 and 1492, on top of the ruins of the first Cittadella (on orders of de' Medici himself), with a round, central tower, of the kind that half a century later came to be replaced by angled bastions. Florentine military architects were involved in the process: Giuliano da Sangallo, Francesco di Giovanni, and Luca del Caprina.

When Charles VIII of France sold Sarzana to the Bank of Saint George in 1496, this included the fortress; in 1562, the Republic of Genoa, which had acquired ownership of the town, completed the fortress.

In 1815 the fortress was used as a police barracks, and until the end of the 1970s it was a prison. Starting in 1985 work began on restoring the fortress and opening it to the public. The fortress is now owned by the Ministry of Culture and is used as a venue for cultural events and exhibitions.

Since 2016, a multimedia experience has also been available that uses NFC technology, video mapping, 360° projections, and capacitive and proximity sensors.

== Description ==
The main building with its quadrilateral plan has a central keep inside, and is surrounded by a moat and a system of defensive walls. The main access is via a path and a stone bridge that leads to the main door, which opens onto the courtyard, lateral to the central body.

== See also ==
- Luni
- Castruccio Castracani
- Sarzana
- Provincia della Spezia
