= Montestrutto Castle =

Neo-gothic Italian Castle

Coordinates: 45°32′24″N 07°50′20″E

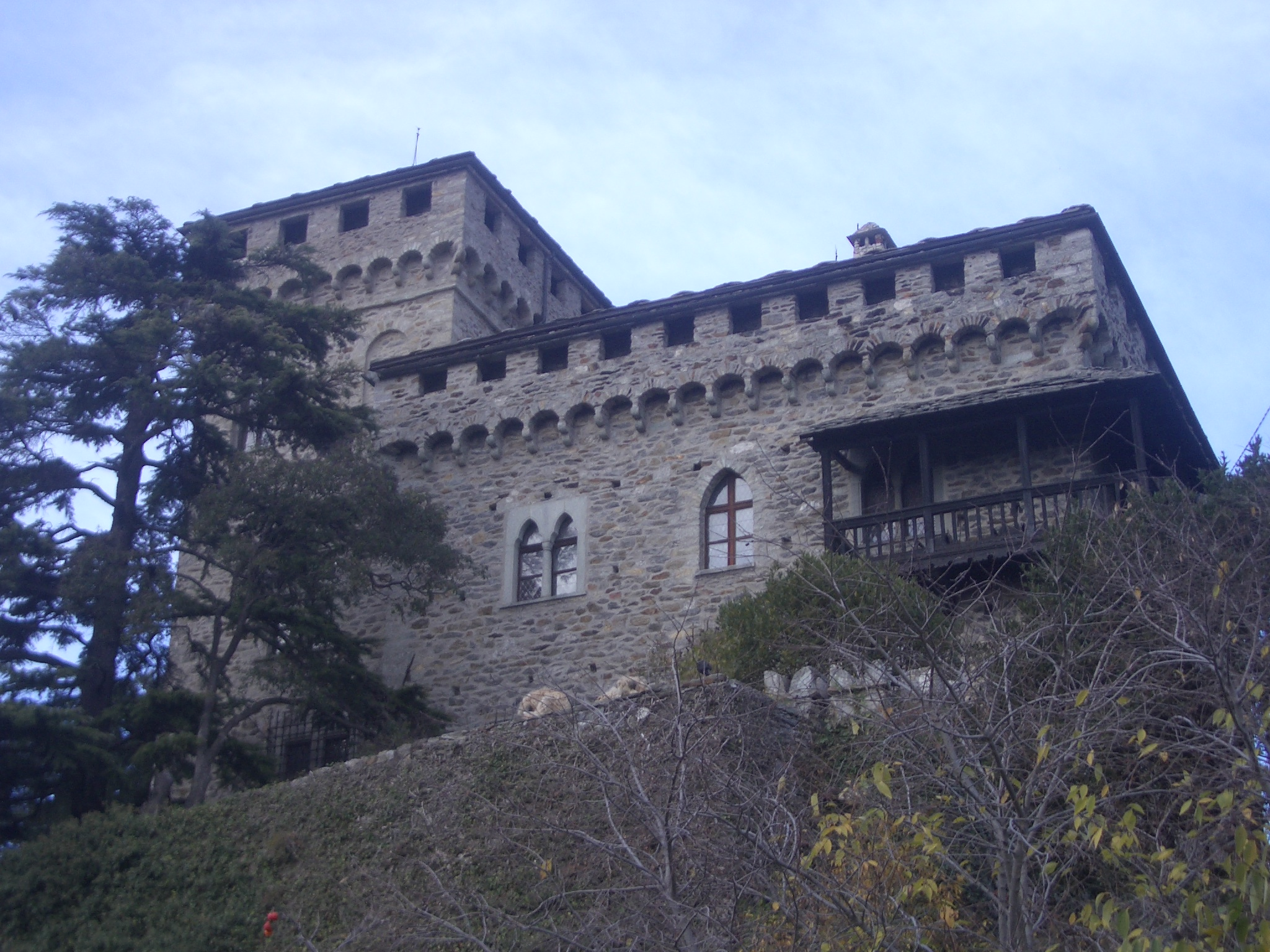
Montestrutto Castle

The Castle of Montestrutto towers above the village of Montestrutto, in the Commune of Settimo Vittone, Piedmont, Italy. It lies on the east bank of the Dora Baltea river and straddles an ancient Roman road that became a part of the Via Francigena, a medieval pilgrimage route from Canterbury to Rome. Indeed, the original Roman name for the village, "Mons obstructus," signifies the fact it partially blocks access to the Valle d'Aosta and the (rest of the) Alps.

== History ==
The Castle itself began life no later than the ninth century (probably about 892) as a defensive tower for a neighboring Benedictine monastery. From the eleventh to the middle of the thirteenth century it was under the control of the bishop-counts in Ivrea, a city that dates to at least Antiquity and is fifteen kilometers south along the Dora Baltea. In the fourteenth century, control of the castle passed to the House of Savoy, Amedeo VI of Savoy gave jurisdiction of it to the ancient Lords of the larger and powerful Castle of Settimo Vittone(among these The Henrys family).Along with numerous other defensive positions in the Valle, the castle was destroyed between 1553 and 1565 by order of the Duke of Savoy, Charles III, as part of a larger campaign to remove any possible obstacles to the passage of French troops into Italy. In 1577, the owners of the castle, as well as of the castles of Settimo Vittone, Castelletto, and Catruzzione, called upon their local communities to reconstruct these fortifications. Whether Montestrutto castle was indeed subsequently rebuilt isn't entirely clear, nor is its exact role during the French assault on the village in 1704, when the town was heavily damaged and subjected to a flood. But apparently the castle was at least somewhat rebuilt by 1800, when Napoleon destroyed it in the course of removing all barriers to his invasion of Italy that year.

In the first years of the twentieth century, an illustrious Montestrutto family, the Pecco, bought the castle property from the Marchetti di Muraglio. As documented in archival photographs from 1901 to 1915, the family patriarch, General Cavaliere Fernando Pecco, who was not only the first podestà of Montestrutto but also a military engineer famous in Italy as the "father" of "modern" military fortifications, rebuilt the tower on its charred remains and added a short extension to it.

In 1919 a wealthy Milanese family, the Broglio, purchased the property, demolished the extension, and decided to reconstruct the castle according to medieval examples elsewhere in the Valle and abroad. For the exterior they and their architect, Vittorio Mesturino, looked primarily to gothic examples and the overall neo-gothic style in Piedmont, Liguria, Lombardy, and France. For the interior the Broglio and their many excellent carpenters, masons, and other local artisans looked to nearby surviving castles from the late Middle Ages, particularly the fortresses of Issogne, Fenis, and Montalto. With extraordinary speed, they completed the castle and its gardens by 1926 and had the interior frescoed by the renowned Turinese painter Carlo Gaudina. However, a reversal of fortune forced the family to put the property up for sale, and after briefly being held by the Abbegg family, who were originally from Switzerland but were then living in Turin, it was acquired in 1929 by the daughters of the famous Italian violinist, composer, and teacher Rosario Scalero. They then presented it to him upon one of his visits back to the Valle during his tenure at Philadelphia's Curtis Institute of Music., and during subsequent sojourns at the castle and after his retirement in 1946, he hosted and taught many of his pupils there, including Samuel Barber, George Walker, Nino Rota, Gian Carlo Menotti, and perhaps his most famous American student, Leonard Bernstein.

After Scalero's death in 1954, the castle was inherited by his three daughters, including the famous translator Alessandra Scalero, who is known for her versions of numerous works by Virginia Woolf and many other contemporaneous English and French authors, and the renowned journalist and translator Liliana Scalero, who is perhaps most remembered for her versions of numerous works by Goethe, Nietzsche, and other German authors.
