= Oratory of San Girolamo, Sarzana =

Church building in Sarzana, Italy

The Oratory of San Girolamo is a free-standing, centralized, Baroque-style, Roman Catholic prayer hall or oratory, near the cathedral, in the center of Sarzana, in the region of Tuscany, Italy.

== History ==
An oratory with a square layout at the site, owned by the Dominican order, had been present since the 15th century, under the management of the Confraternity of San Girolamo. The Confraternity had existed in Sarzana since 1470. This oratory had a polychrome terra-cotta depicting St Jerome in the Desert, attributed to either the studio of Giovanni Della Robbia or Benedetto Buglioni. This work is now relocated to the cathedral. Around 1710–1733, the oratory underwent a major refurbishment creating the elliptical structure we see today. The interior has two lateral altars, one dedicated to the Virgin of Loreto, and the other to the Crucifix. The interior has a ceiling frescoed from sotto in su by artists from the Genoese studios of Domenico Piola or of Giovanni Andrea de Ferrari. The architects and specific painters are not known.

== See also ==
- Catholic Church in Italy
