= Revere, Borgo Mantovano =

Revere
- Frazione
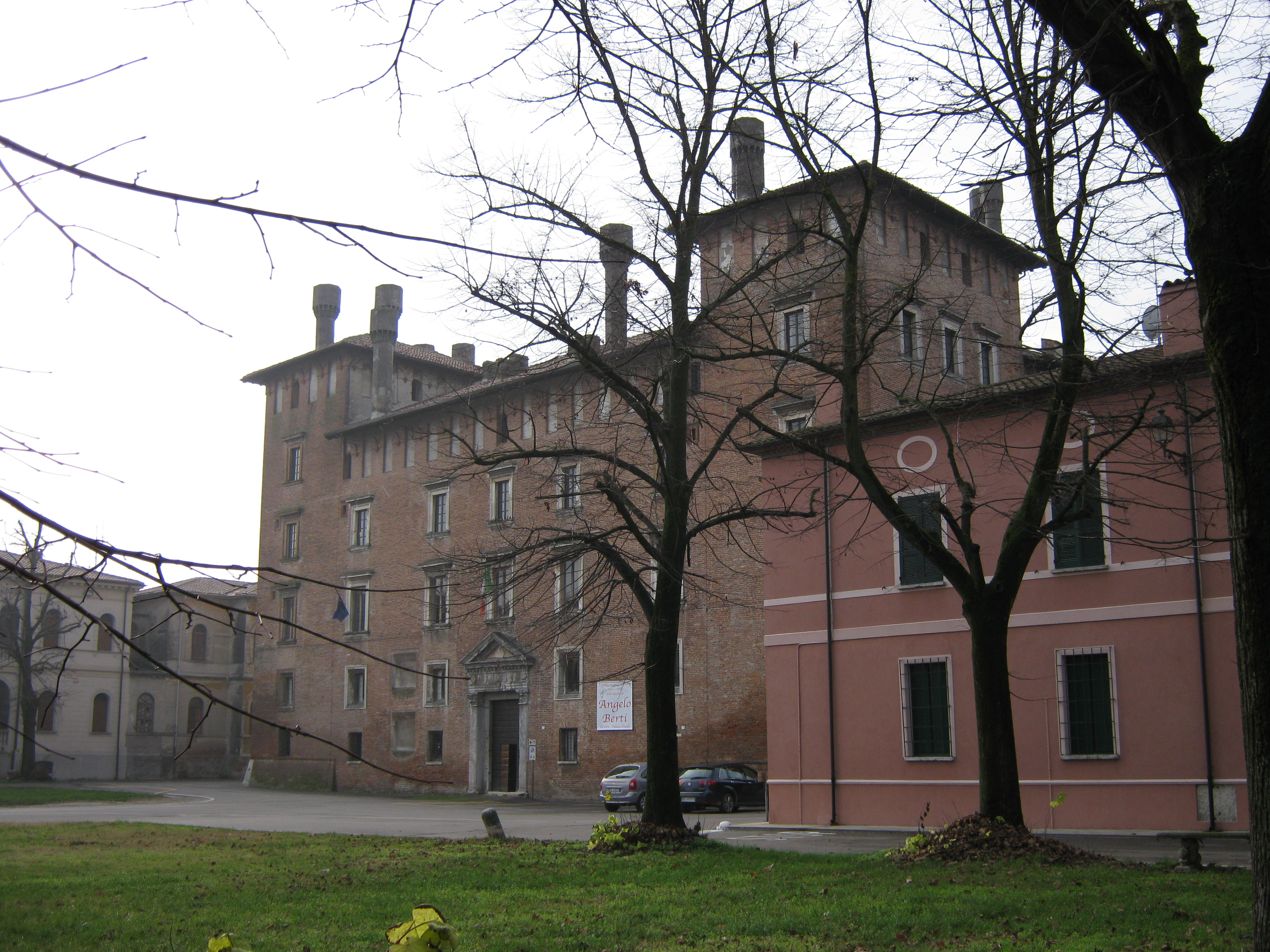

- Location of Revere in Italy
- Coordinates: 45°3′N 11°8′E
- Country: Italy
- Region: Lombardy
- Province: Mantua (MN)
- Comune: Borgo Mantovano

Area
  - Total: 14.2 km^{2} (5.5 sq mi)

Population (Dec. 2004)
  - Total: 2,514
  - Density: 177/km^{2} (459/sq mi)
- Time zone: UTC+1 (CET)
  - Summer (DST): UTC+2 (CEST)
- Postal code: 46036
- Dialing code: 0386

Revere is a frazione of Borgo Mantovano in the Province of Mantua in Lombardy, northern Italy, located about 160 kilometres (99 mi) southeast of Milan and about 30 kilometres (19 mi) southeast of Mantua. It was a separate comune until 2018; it now houses the municipal seat of Borgo Mantovano.

== History ==
It was fortified by Modena and Reggio Emilia to defend the shores of the Po river from attacks by Mantua, who captured it in 1125. From 1332 it became part of the territories of the Gonzaga.

During World War II it experienced thirty-two bombing raids by the British and American airforces. During the final offensive in Italy, it was liberated by the 88th Infantry Division on 24 April 1945.

== People ==
- Zachariah Carpi
- Luigi Olivetti
