= Sant'Andrea, Pistoia =

Coordinates: 43°56′9.08″N 10°54′47.06″E

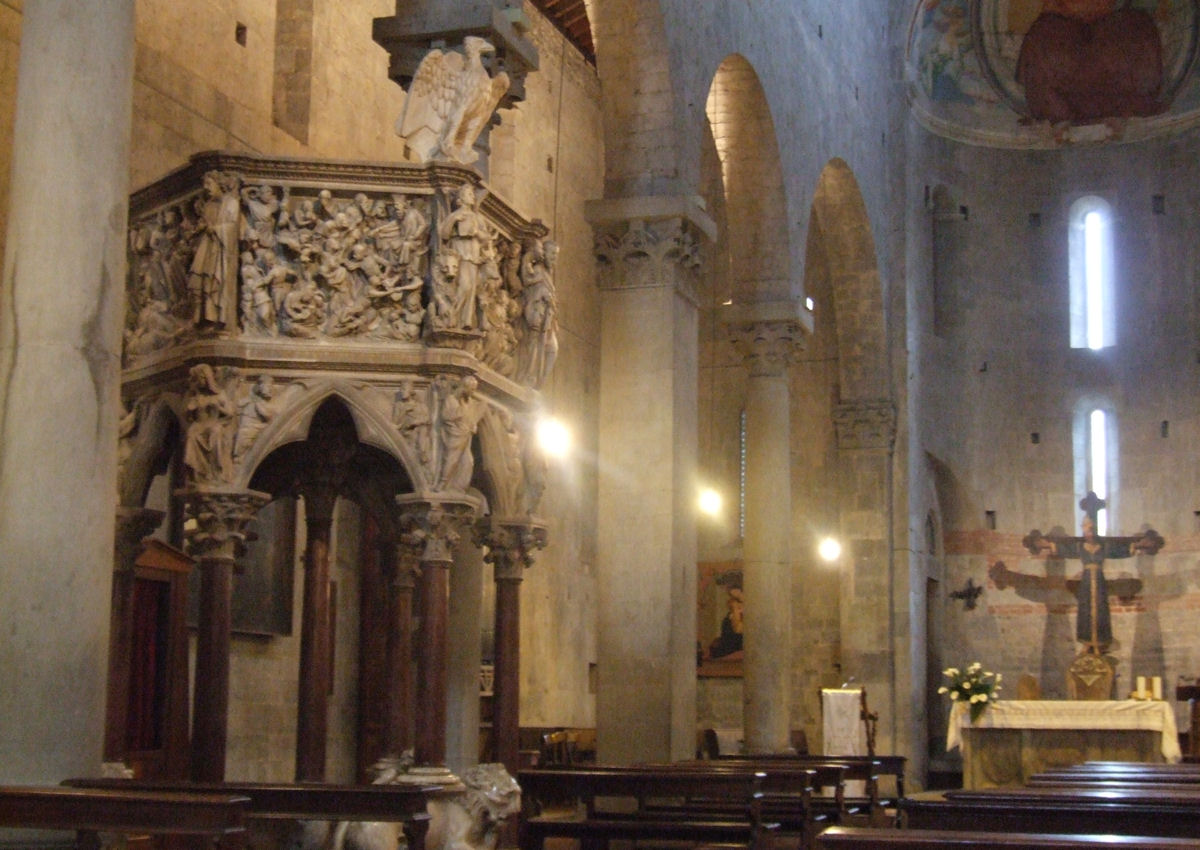
The nave with Giovanni Pisano's pulpit.

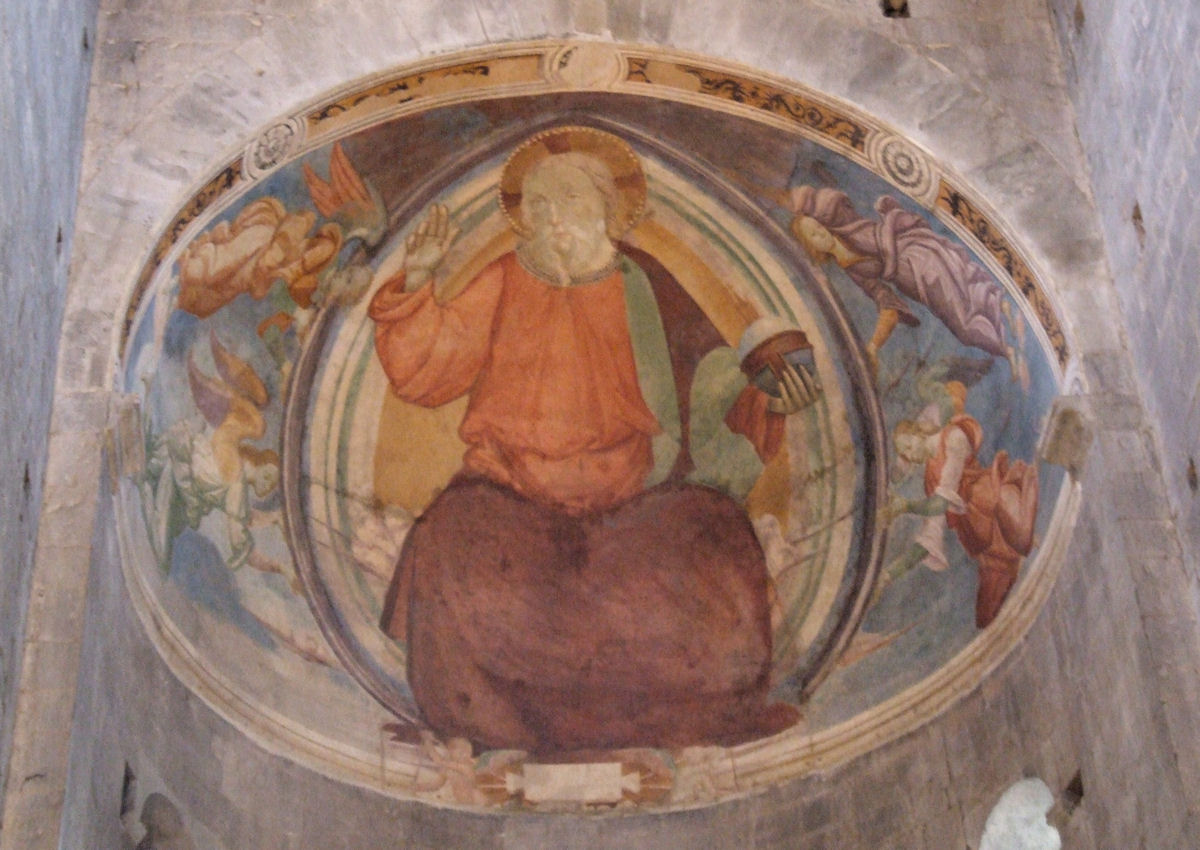
Fresco of the Blessing Christ.

Sant'Andrea (Pieve di Sant'Andrea) is a church in Pistoia, Tuscany, central Italy, that served as a pieve or place that congregations from surrounding village churches use for baptism. It is dedicated to St. Andrew the Apostle, and includes the famous Pulpit of Sant' Andrea by Giovanni Pisano. The church probably dates from as early as the 8th century, though in a smaller size. In the 12th century it was extended in length.

The façade shows the typical bichrome marble decoration of the Pistoiese Romanesque style, executed in the mid-12th century by Gruamonte and his brother Adeodatus, who was also responsible for the sculptures and for the portal's architrave. The latter depicts the "Journey of the Magi", a rare theme whose use here derives from the fact that the church was located on the Via Francigena, by which, in the Middle Ages, the pilgrims reached Rome from France. The decorated capitals are by a Master Henry, while the small statue of St. Andrew in the lunette over the portal is reminiscent of Giovanni Pisano's style.

In the late 15th century the upper façade was finished and the central nave was vaulted. The frescoes in the apse date to 1506, executed by Bernardino del Signoraccio. Today only the central part, with the Father supported by Four Angels, survives. The altars in the aisles were added in the 17th century, with paintings by artists such as Cristofano Allori, Alessio Gimignani, and Girolamo Scaglia.
