= Pieve di Sant'Andrea (Cercina) =

Church in Tuscany, Italy

Coordinates: 43°53′07.40″N 10°43′20″E

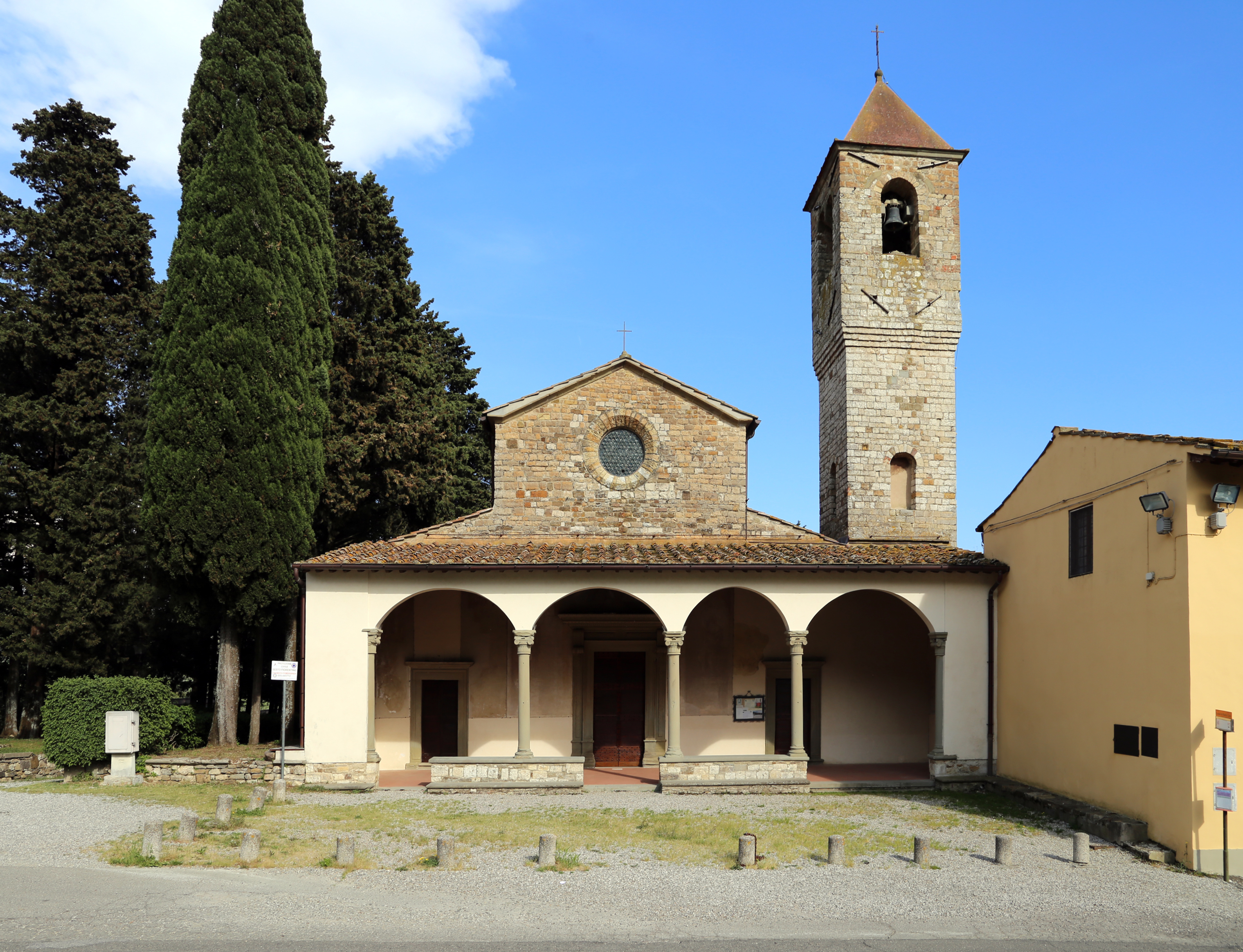
Pieve di Sant'Andrea.

The Pieve di Sant'Andrea is an 11th-century pieve (rural church) in Cercina, Tuscany, central Italy.

The tiny Romanesque baptismal church (Pieve) of Sant'Andrea has its origins before the eleventh century as San Gerusalemme di Cersino; by the mid-eleventh century it is referred to as Sant'Andrea. It was patronized by the family of Cattani di Cercina e di Castiglioni, as well as the Adimari, Figiovanni and others. A miraculous wooden sculpture of the Virgin, perhaps from the twelfth century, was the object of wide veneration, particularly by a lay company of Florence, which annually came in procession. Sometime partakers in this procession were the archbishop, St. Antoninus, and Pope Leo X, as well as members of the Medici family.

Initiated in Romanesque style, it was later remade. It has a sturdy bell tower with single and double mullioned windows. The interior is on a nave, and houses fragments of 14th-century frescoes (St. Anthony and one Female Saint). Other painting works include a Virgin Enthonred with Child between Sts. Andrew and John the Baptist (16th century), the Resurrection of Christ between Sts. Anthony of Padua, Mary Magdalene and Catherine of Alexandria by Francesco Curradi, and two panels with a Nativity between Sts. Lucy and Jerome and Massacre of the Innocents.

The marble baptismal font dates to 1613, while the stoup, also in marble, is from 1540.

Domenico Ghirlandaio painted the murals the occupy the Aspe at the head of the right aisle, to the right of the main altar. The frescoes were walled up sometime in the seventeenth century when the apses were closed and the main chapel enlarged. The frescoes were uncovered in 1923. They were last restored in 1969.
