= Eva Olivetti =

Uruguayan painter

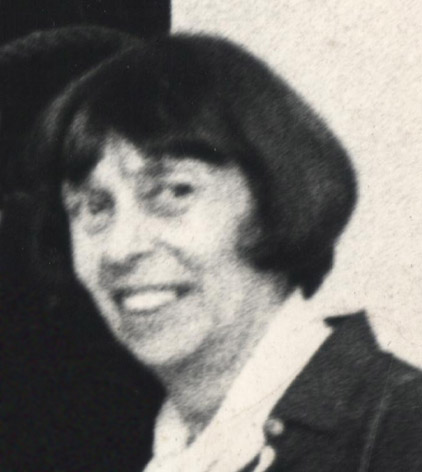
- Olivetti in 1993
- Born: Eva Brager Jacobsohn; 20 July 1924; Berlin, Germany
- Died: 23 May 2013 (aged 88); Montevideo, Uruguay
- Occupations: Visual artist, painter
- Spouse: Mario Olivetti

Eva Olivetti (born Eva Brager Jacobsohn; 20 July 1924 – 23 May 2013) was a Uruguayan painter.

== Biography ==
Olivetti was born to parents, Karl Brager and Kähte Jacobsohn. The family fled Nazi Germany in 1939 and they settled in the city of Montevideo.

In 1948, she married and adopted the surname of her husband, engineer Mario Olivetti, an Italian immigrant, brother of artist Linda Kohen. From 1949 to 1956, Olivetti studied a Bachelor of Arts at the Faculty of Humanities and Sciences of the University of the Republic. In 1956, she entered Taller Torres García to learn ceramics with the Catalan artist Joseph Collell and from 1963 on she studied painting with José Gurvich. She dedicated herself to drawing and ceramics, but mainly to painting. From 1960, until her last years, Olivetti held numerous exhibitions of her work in Uruguay. In 2003, she was awarded the Lifetime Achievement Award of the 38th Montevideo Municipal Hall.

== Work ==
Olivetti painted portraits, flowers and still lifes, but her most outstanding work was as a landscaper. Urban landscapes, deserted streets, squares, trees, fields and beaches, with a slight brushstroke, with a calmed tonal scale, full of golds and browns with small chromatic variations. An indirect disciple of Joaquín Torres García, through the teachings of Gurvich, she received a unique sense of sensitive construction that gave structure to the intimacy of her work.
