= Luigi Olivetti =

Italian painter (1856–1941)

Luigi Olivetti (November 19, 1856 – January 28, 1941) was an Italian painter, both in oil and watercolor, and engraver. His secular birth name was Luigi Giacomo Angelo.

He was born in Revere, Lombardy. In 1883, at Rome, he exhibited a watercolor titled Città, and in 1884 at Turin, at the National Exhibition he exhibited Cecilia la Guida delle Catacombe, La figlia del Borgomastro, and Ricordi of the Brettagna. He painted the genre painting: Ragazza sullo sfondo di Tivoli.

He was a resident of Rome, and late in life, moved with his wife Mariannina Palma to Tivoli, where died in 1941. He is buried in Rome in the Verano Monumental Cemetery.
