= Olivotti =

Olivotti may refer to:

- A trading name of interior designers Piero Malacrida de Saint-August and his wife Nadja Malacrida
- The Olivotti Troubadours, featuring Roy Butin and Michael Banner
- a 1916 United States legal case, United States v. Olivotti
- Olivotti Lake; see List of lakes in Wisconsin

== See also ==
- Olivetti
