= Priamo della Quercia =

Italian painter

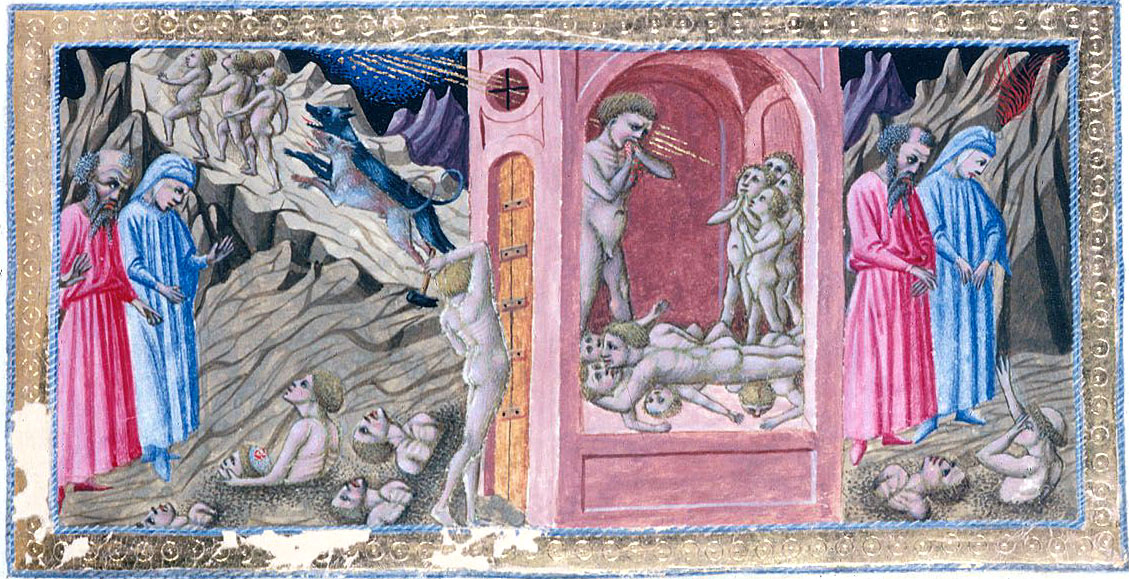
Dante and Virgil in the Inferno before Ugolino and His Sons by Priamo della Quercia

Priamo della Quercia (c. 1400 – 1467) was an Italian painter and miniaturist of the early Renaissance. He was the brother of the famous sculptor Jacopo della Quercia.
