= Pieve di Coriano =

- Frazione
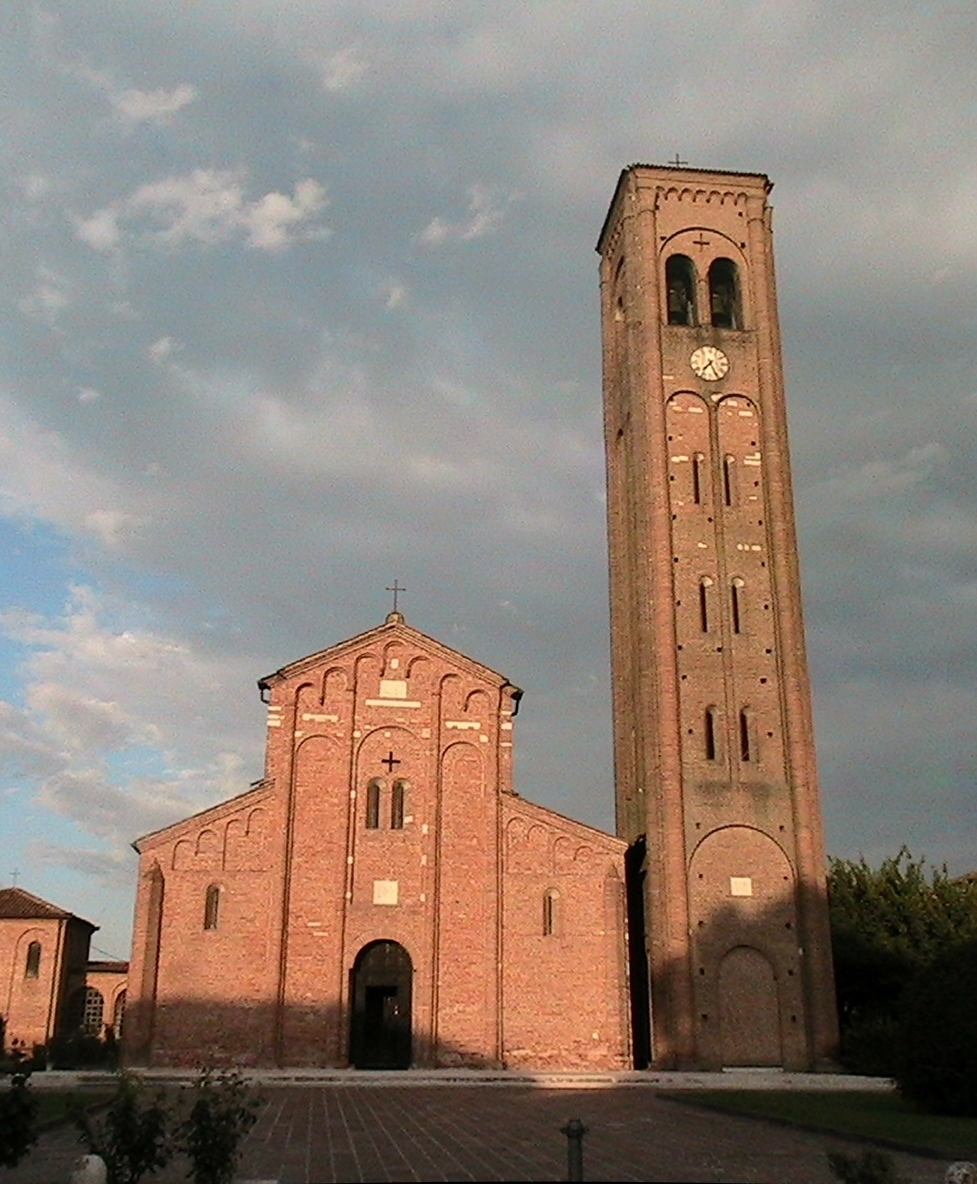
- Church of Santa Maria Assunta

- Location of Pieve di Coriano in Italy
- Coordinates: 45°2′N 11°6′E
- Country: Italy
- Region: Lombardy
- Province: Mantua (MN)
- Comune: Borgo Mantovano

Area
  - Total: 12.6 km^{2} (4.9 sq mi)

Population (Dec. 2004)
  - Total: 910
  - Density: 72/km^{2} (190/sq mi)
- Demonym: Pievesi
- Time zone: UTC+1 (CET)
  - Summer (DST): UTC+2 (CEST)
- Postal code: 46020
- Dialing code: 0386

Pieve di Coriano is a frazione of Borgo Mantovano in the Province of Mantua in the Italian region Lombardy, located about 160 kilometres (99 mi) southeast of Milan and about 30 kilometres (19 mi) southeast of Mantua.
