= Pieve di Sant'Andrea, Sarzana =

Church in Liguria, Italy

Coordinates: 44°6′45.43″N 9°57′38.97″E

The Pieve di Sant'Andrea is an ancient Romanesque parish church located in Via Giuseppe Mazzini, in the center of the town of Sarzana, Province of La Spezia, region of Liguria, Italy.

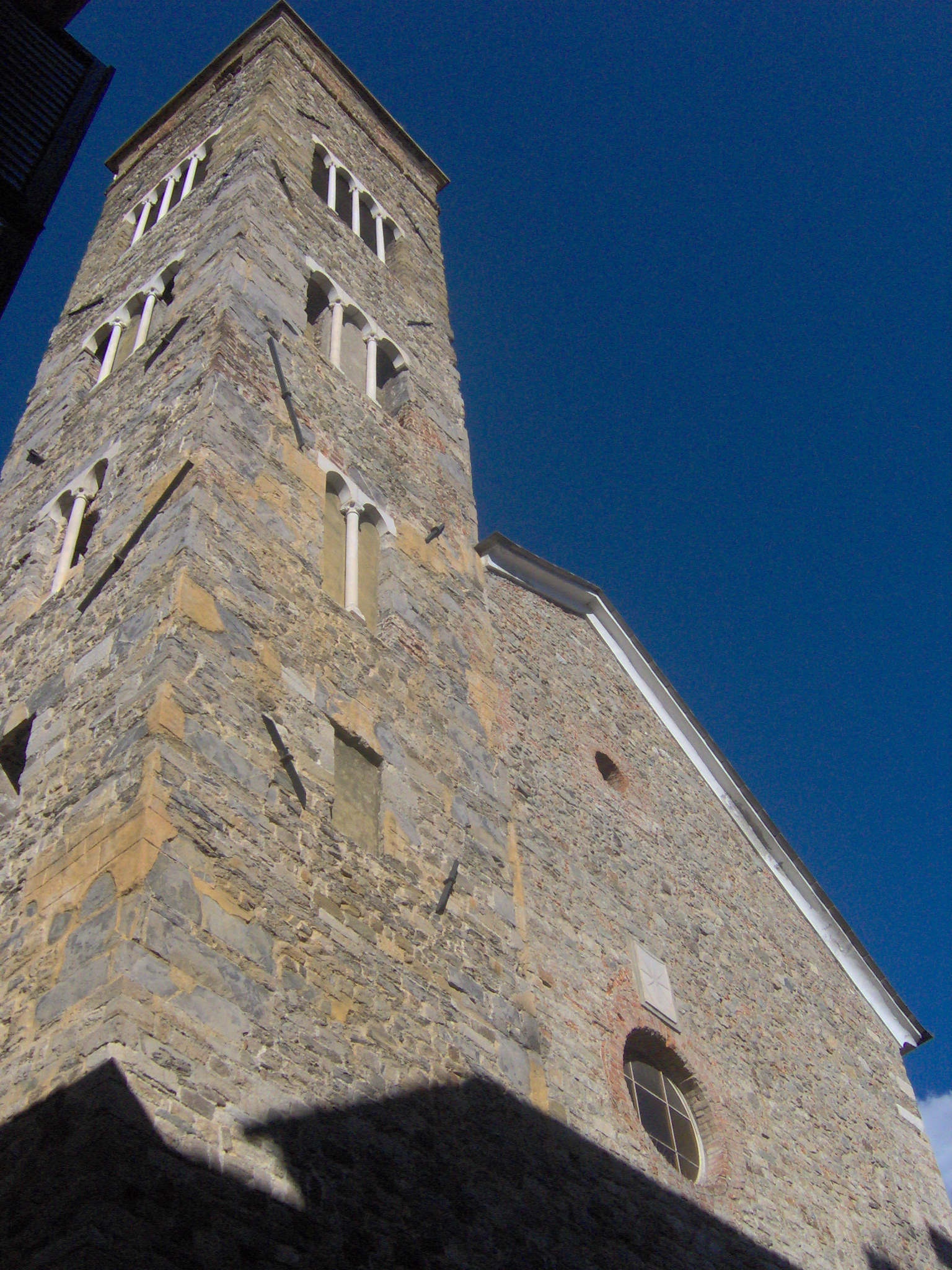
The facade of the church.

== History ==
The church was built in the 10th–11th century, atop an older church of which only part of the facade remains. The first document mentioning the church dates back to 1128. The church was enlarged in the 16th century. The almost bare stone facade is unusual for its portal with caryatid pilasters. The marble architrave is decorated with angels and festoons of fruit. The portal once had three 15th-century marble statues of Saints Peter, Paul, and Andrew, now moved inside of the church. The facade also has a seal of the town, carved in stone, consisting of a shield and eight pointed stars, in reference to the Statutes of the Comune of Sarzana in 1330. The portal has a mullioned window, and three arches surmounted by small busts. The square Romanesque bell-tower has increasing mullion arches as it rises. Above the entrance portal is a mullioned window.

The baptismal font was sculpted by Giovanni Morello. The church houses 14th– and 15th-century altarpieces such as the Madonna and Child and a Saints Fabiano and Sebastian by Giovanni Andrea Bogianus and a Vocation of St John and St James and a Vocation of St Clair by the studio of Domenico Fiasella. The organ was built by the German master Giorgio Steiniger in the 18th century and moved here from the Cathedral of Sarzana.
