= List of castles in Italy =

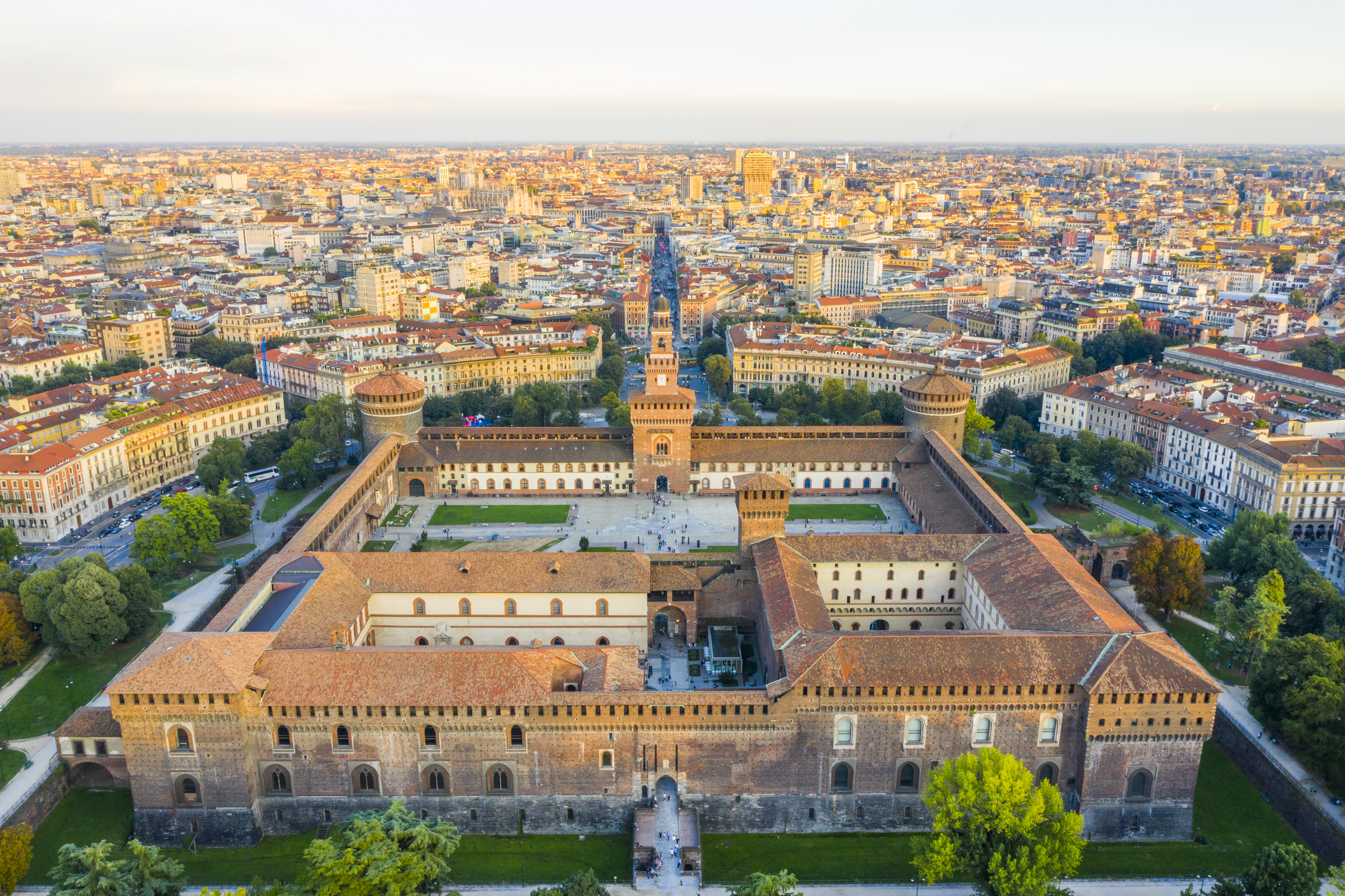
Sforza Castle, Milan

This is a list of castles in Italy by location.

== Abruzzo ==
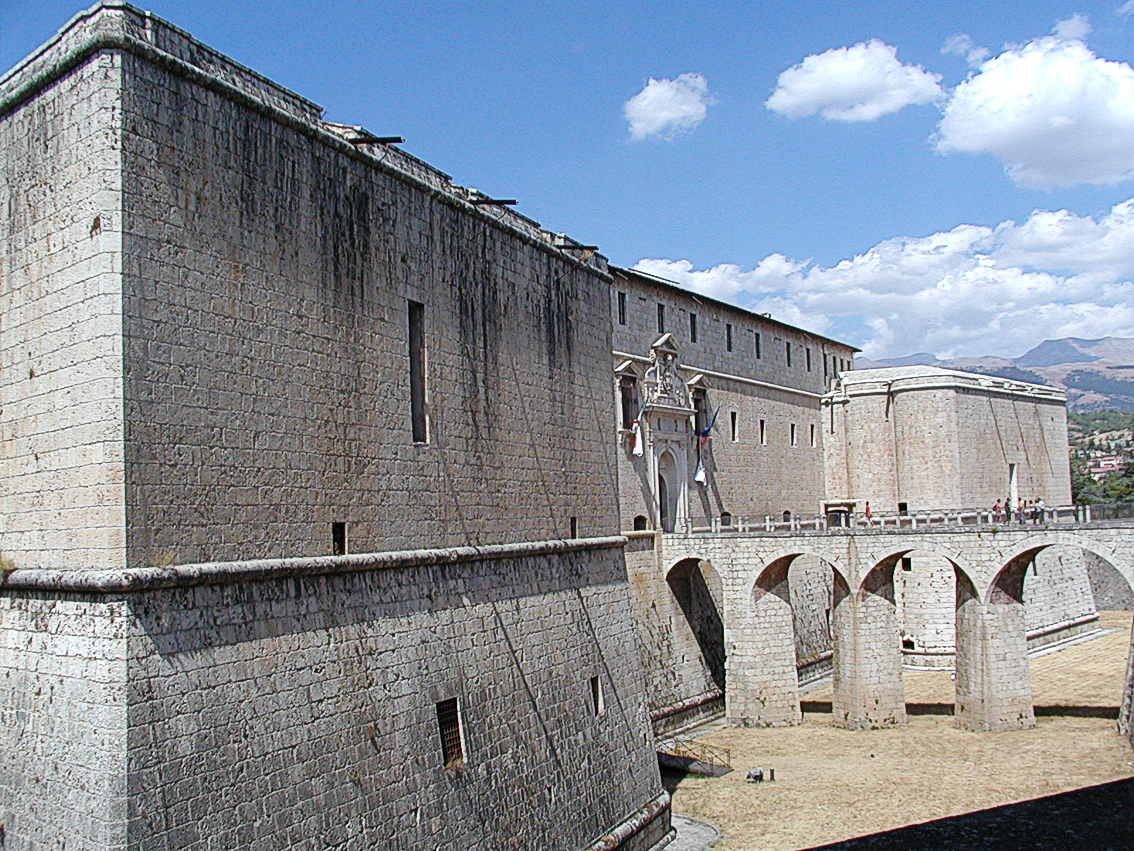
Forte Spagnolo, L'Aquila

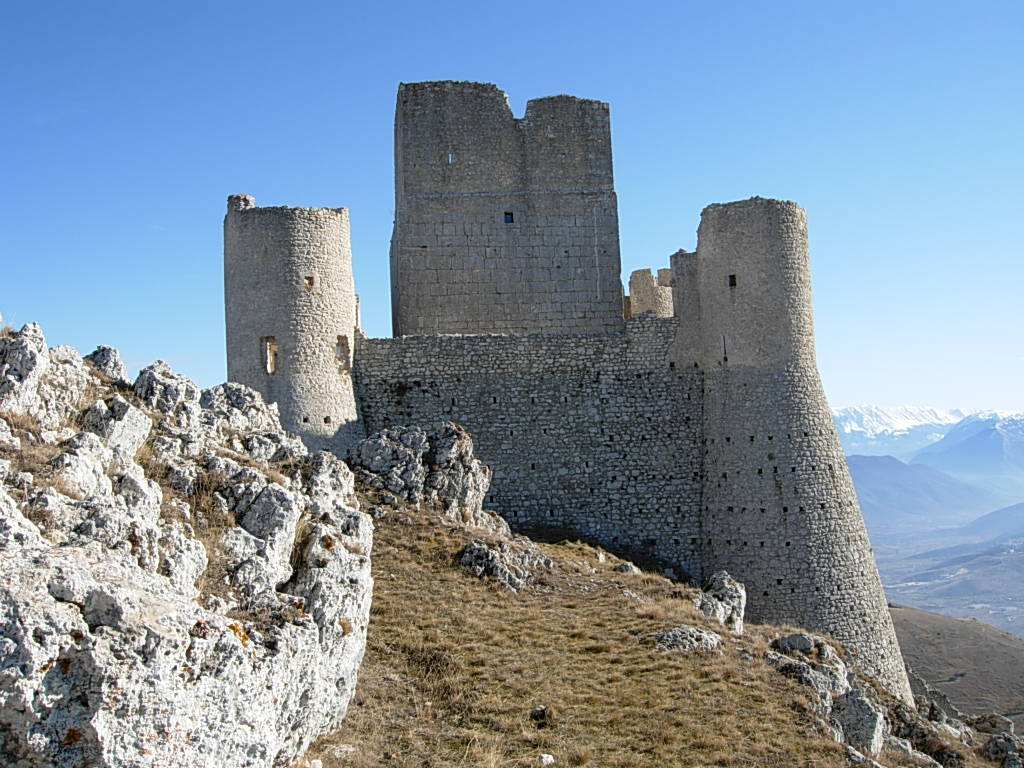
Rocca Calascio, Calascio

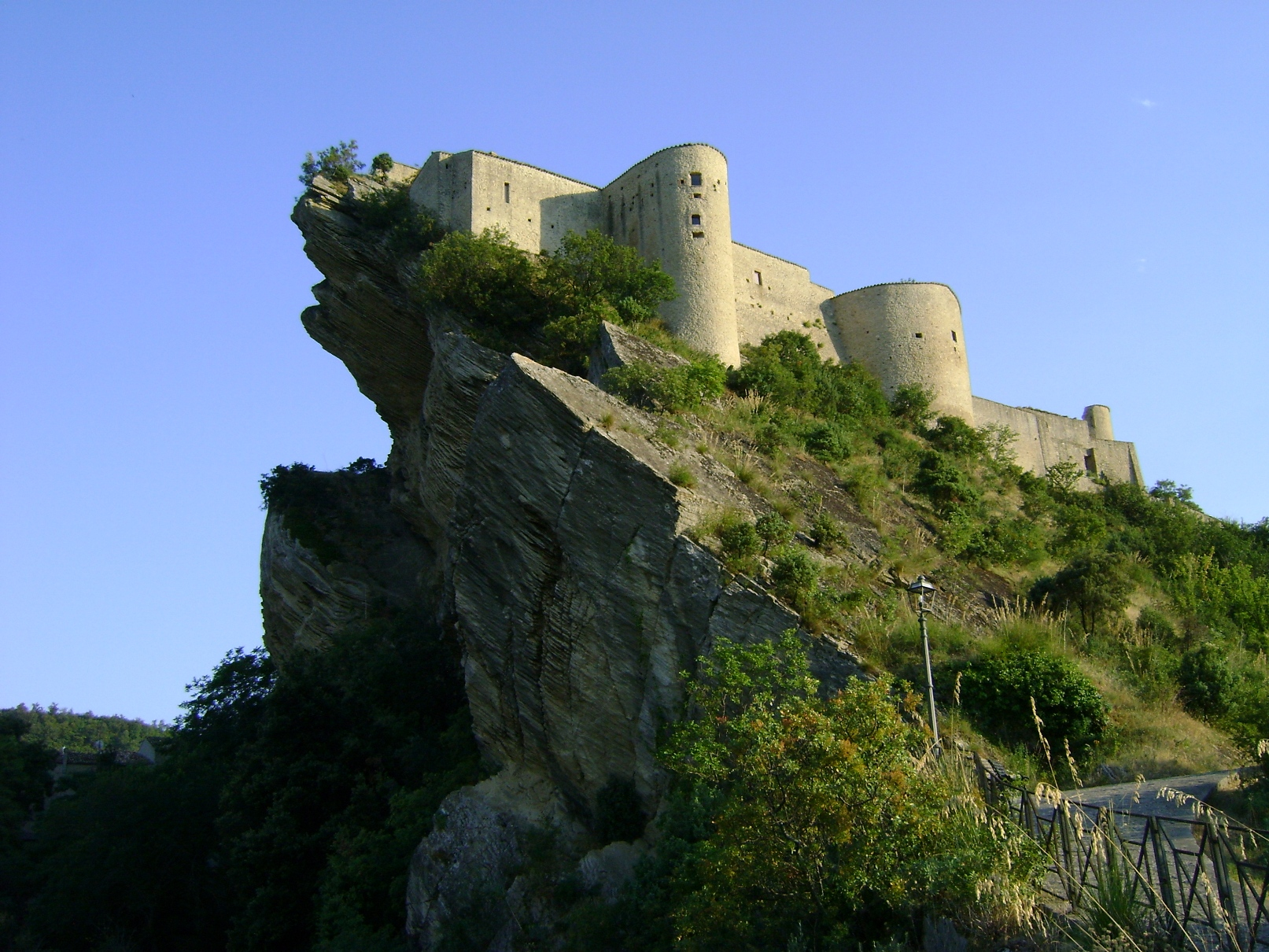
Castello di Roccascalegna, Roccascalegna

Province of L'Aquila

- Castello normanno, Anversa degli Abruzzi
- Castello Orsini-Colonna, Avezzano
- Castello Piccolomini, Balsorano
- Castle of Barisciano, Barisciano
- Castello di Barrea, Barrea
- Castle of Bominaco, Bominaco
- Castello di Bugnara, Bugnara
- Rocca Calascio, Calascio
- Castello Piccolomini, Capestrano
- Castello di Carsoli, Carsoli
- Castello di Castel di Sangro, Castel di Sangro
- Palazzo dei Conti di Celano, Castelvecchio Subequo
- Castello Piccolomini, Celano
- Castle of Fossa, Fossa
- Castello di Gagliano Aterno, Gagliano Aterno
- Forte Spagnolo, L'Aquila
- Castello Orsini, Massa d'Albe
- Palazzo Santucci, Navelli
- Castle of Ocre, Ocre
- Castello di Oricola, Oricola
- Castello di Ortona dei Marsi, Ortona dei Marsi
- Castello Piccolomini, Ortucchio
- Castello Caldora, Pacentro
- Castello di Pereto, Pereto
- Castello Cantelmo, Pettorano sul Gizio
- Castel Camponeschi, Prata d'Ansidonia
- Castello De Sanctis, Roccacasale
- Castle of San Pio delle Camere, San Pio delle Camere
- Castle of Sant'Eusanio Forconese, Sant'Eusanio Forconese
- Rocca Orsini, Scurcola Marsicana
- Rocca di Villalago, Villalago

Province of Chieti

- Palazzo baronale, Archi
- Castle of Carpineto Sinello, Carpineto Sinello
- Castello Masciantonio, Casoli
- Castelfraiano, Castiglione Messer Marino
- Castello Caldora, Civitaluparella
- Castello Baglioni, Civitella Messer Raimondo
- Castello ducale di Crecchio, Crecchio
- Castello di Gamberale, Gamberale
- Castello di Septe, Mozzagrogna
- Castello Franceschelli, Montazzoli
- Castello di Monteodorisio, Monteodorisio
- Castello Aragonese, Ortona
- Castello marchesale, Palmoli
- Castello di Roccascalegna, Roccascalegna
- Castello Caldoresco, Vasto

Province of Pescara

- Castello di Musellaro, Bolognano
- Castello Mediceo, Bussi sul Tirino
- Castello Chiola-Caracciolo, Loreto Aprutino
- Castello De Sterlich-Aliprandi, Nocciano
- Castello ducale, Pescosansonesco
- Castello ducale Cantelmo, Popoli
- Palazzo De Felice, Rosciano
- Castello di Salle, Salle
- Castello Farnese, San Valentino in Abruzzo Citeriore
- Castel Menardo, Serramonacesca
- Castello Caracciolo, Tocco da Casauria
- Castello Gizzi, Torre de' Passeri

Province of Teramo

- Palazzo De Sterlich, Cermignano
- Fortezza di Civitella del Tronto, Civitella del Tronto
- Castel Manfrino, Valle Castellana

== Aosta Valley ==
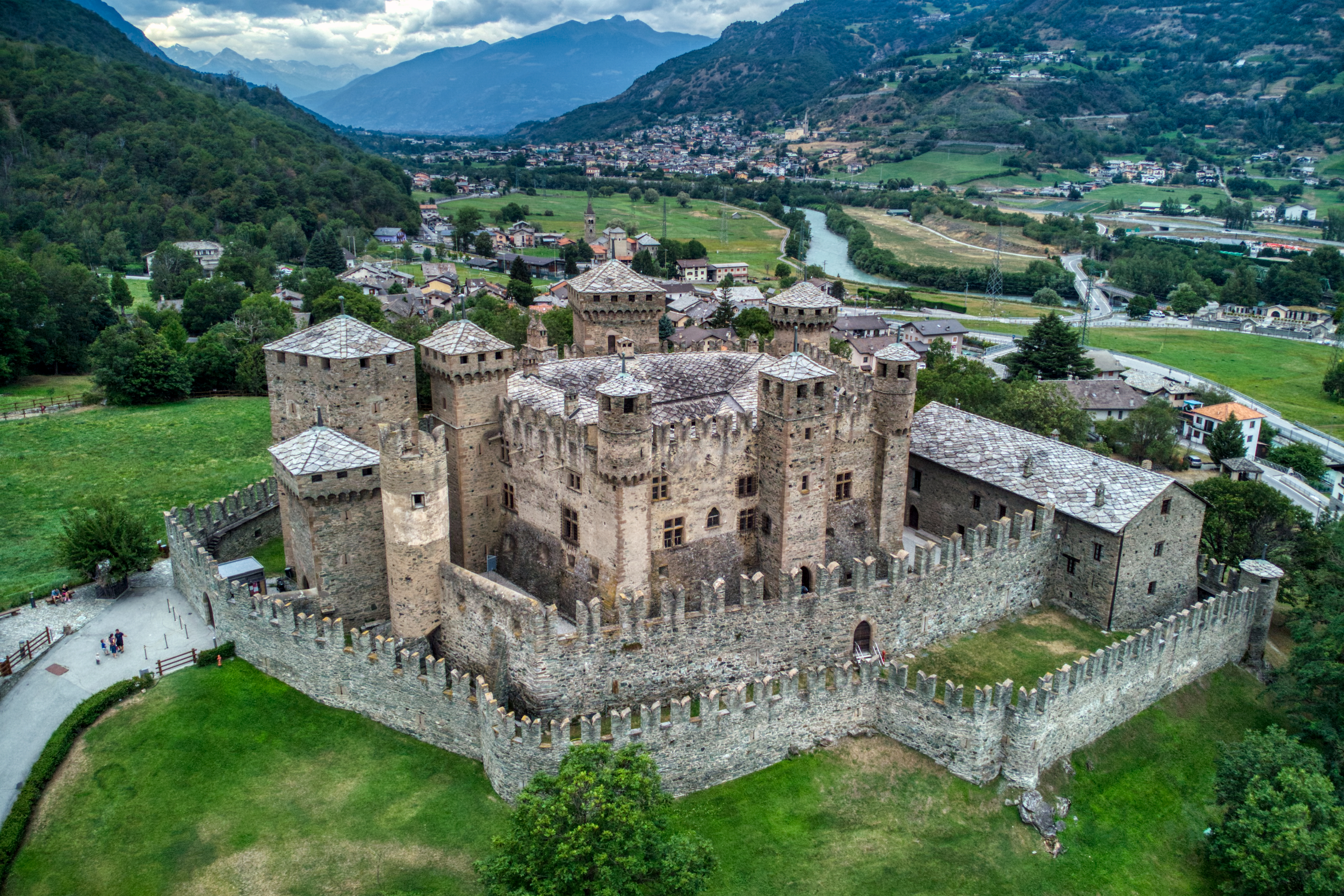
Fénis Castle, Fénis

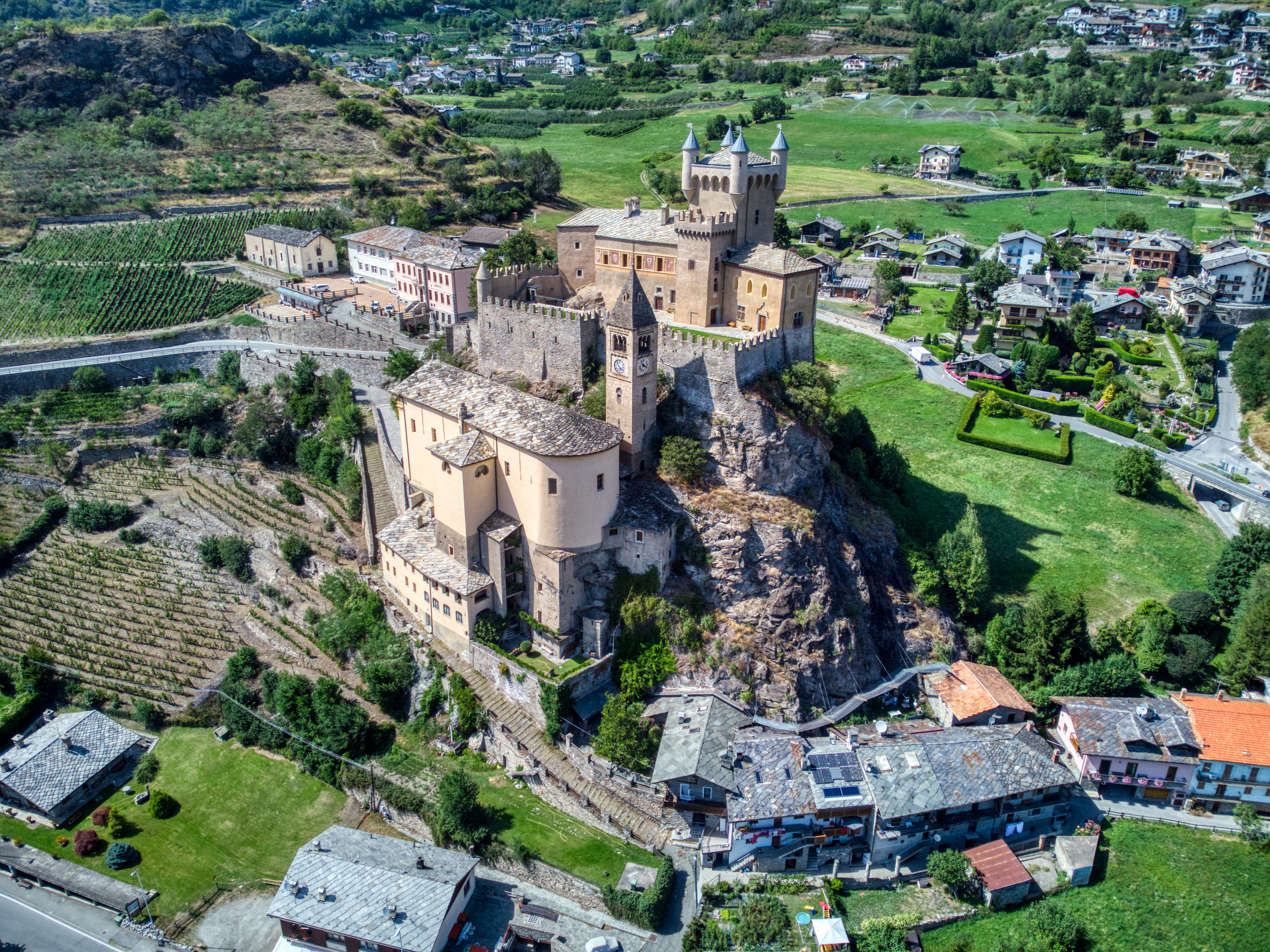
Saint-Pierre Castle, Saint-Pierre

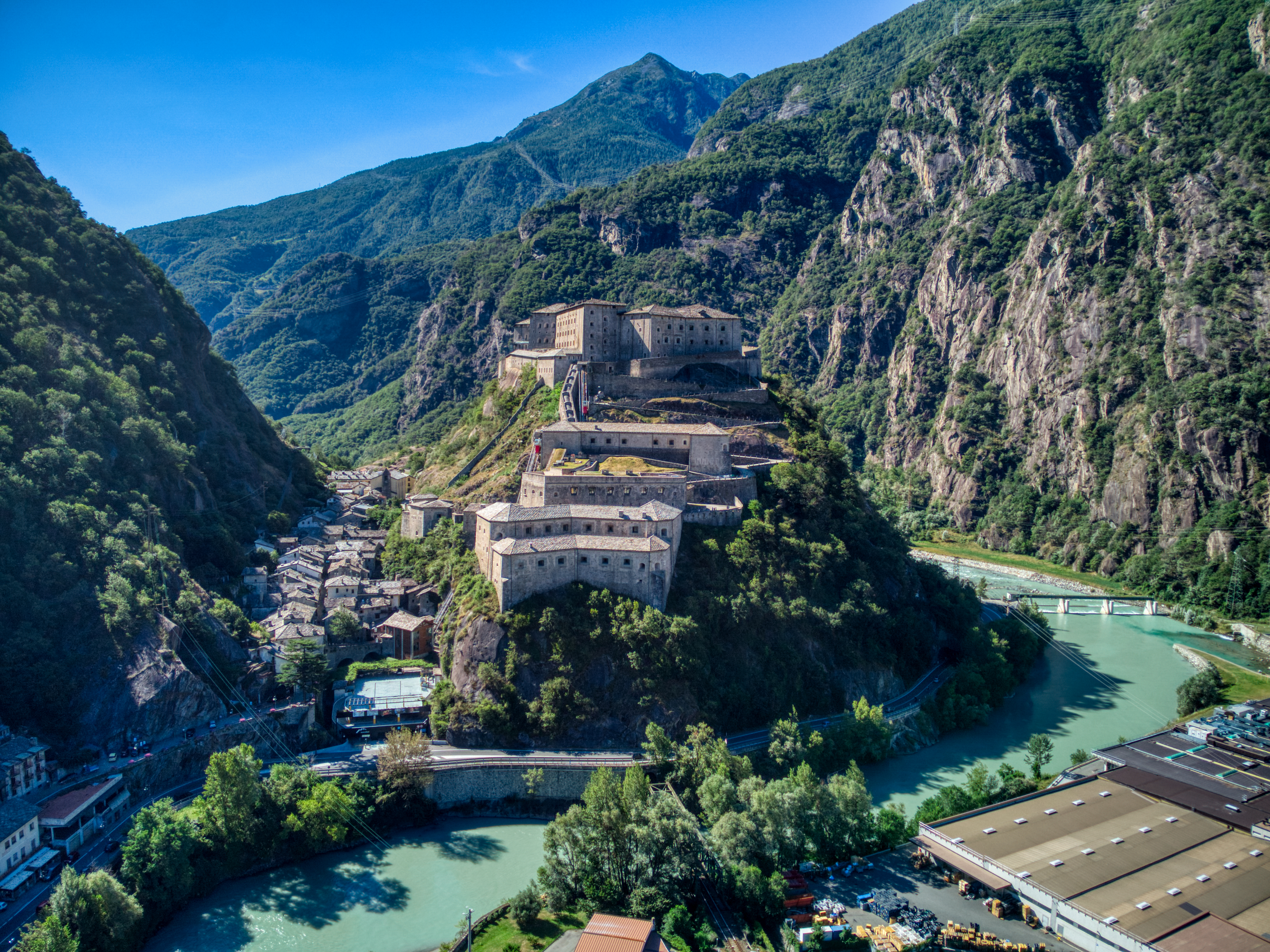
Fort Bard, Bard

- Baraing Castle, Pont-Saint-Martin
- Savoy Castle (Gressoney-Saint-Jean), Gressoney-Saint-Jean
- Fort Bard (or Bard Fort), Bard
- Verrès Castle, Verrès
- Issogne Castle, Issogne
- Graines Castle, Brusson
- Chenal Castle, Montjovet
- Saint-Germain Castle (Aosta Valley), Montjovet
- Ussel Castle, Châtillon
- Cly Castle, Saint Denis
- Fénis Castle, Fénis
- Nus Castle, Nus
- Quart Castle, Quart
- Bramafam Castle, Aosta
- Sarre Castle, Sarre
- Aymavilles Castle, Aymavilles
- Saint-Pierre Castle, Saint-Pierre
- Sarriod de la Tour Castle, Saint-Pierre
- Châtel-Argent, Villeneuve
- Introd Castle, Introd
- Montmayeur Castle, Arvier
- Avise Castle, Avise
- Châtelard Castle, La Salle

== Apulia ==
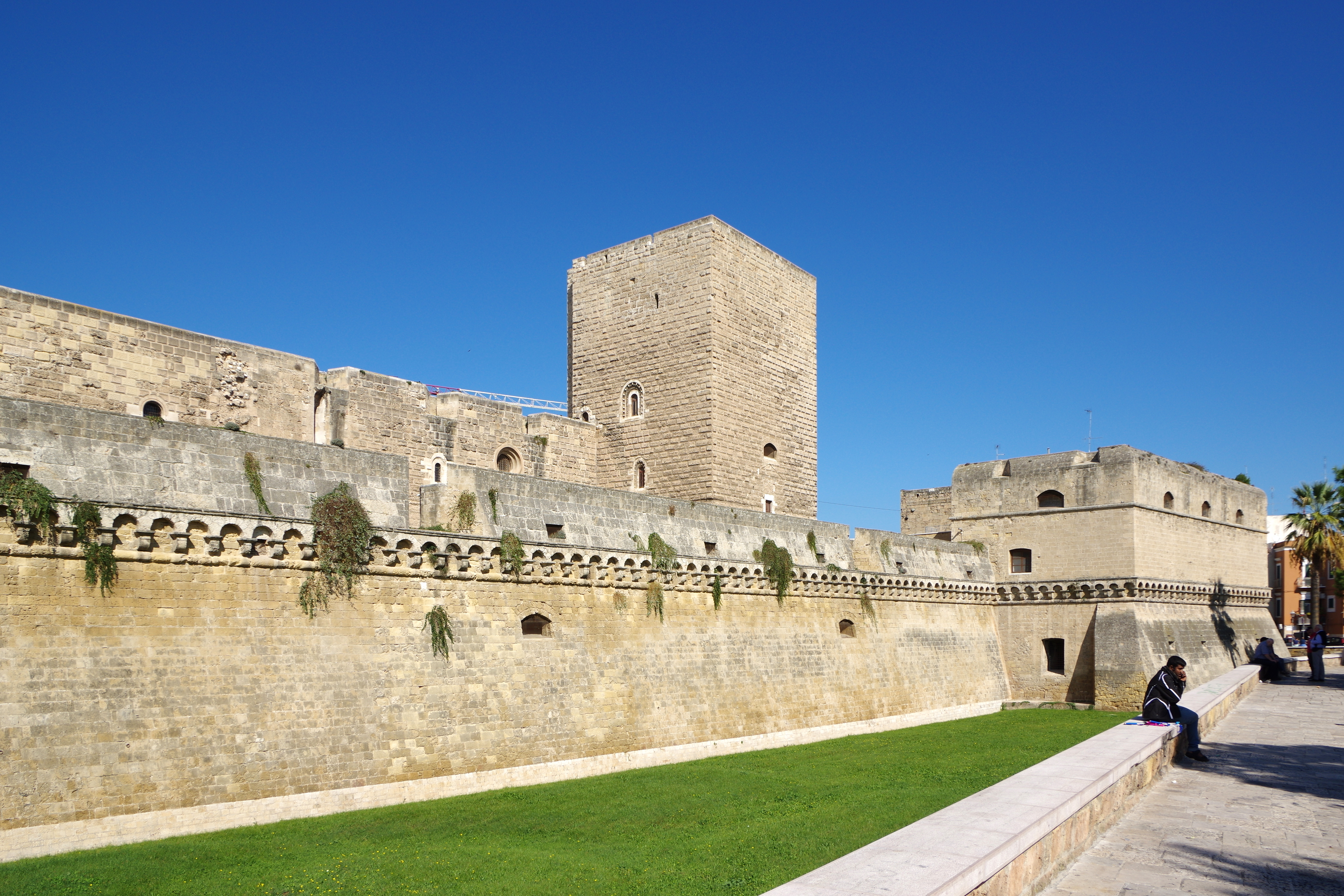
Castello Svevo, Bari

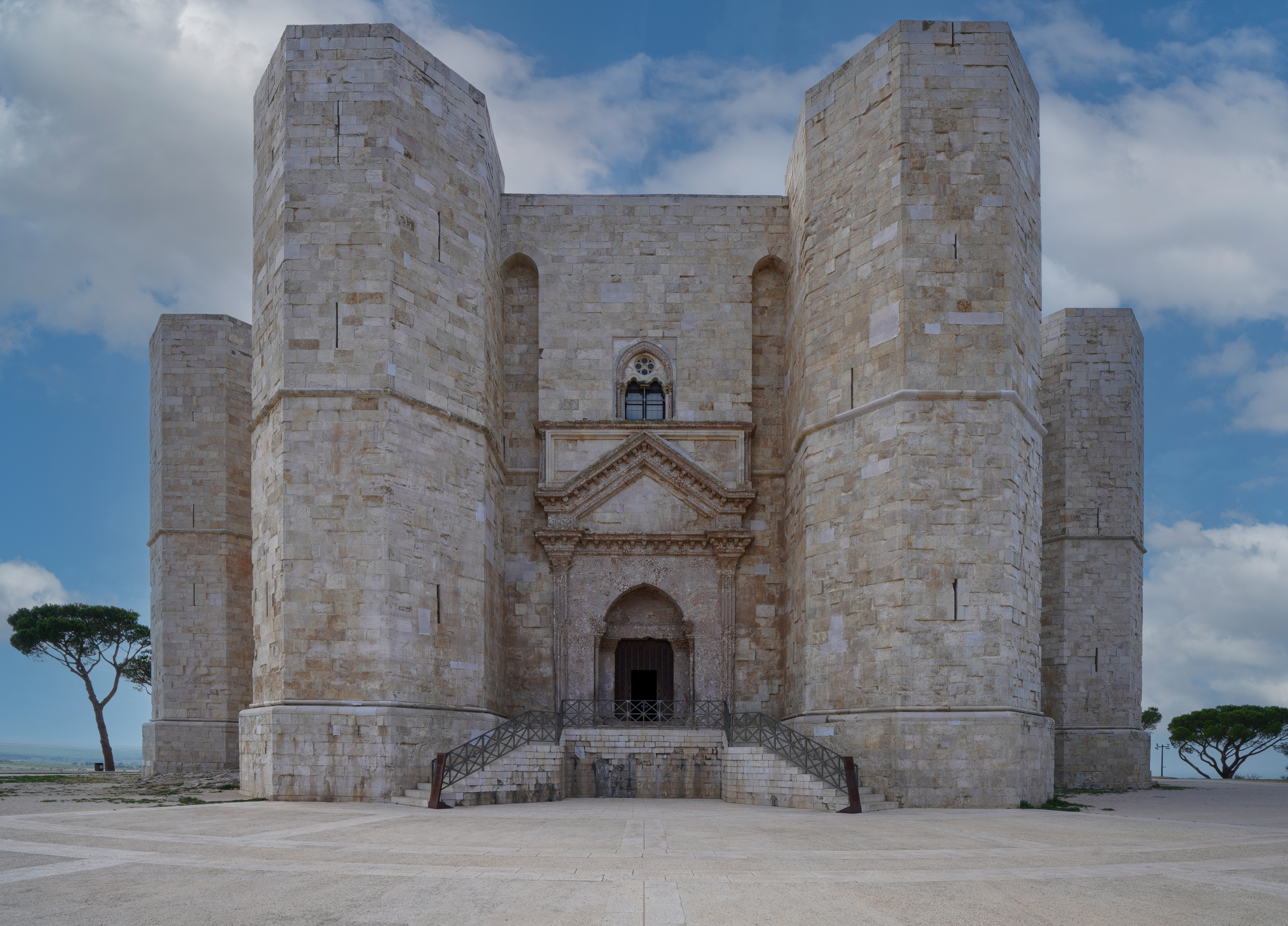
Castel del Monte, Andria

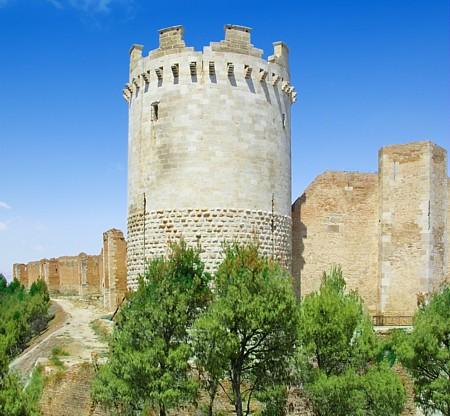
Lucera Castle, Lucera

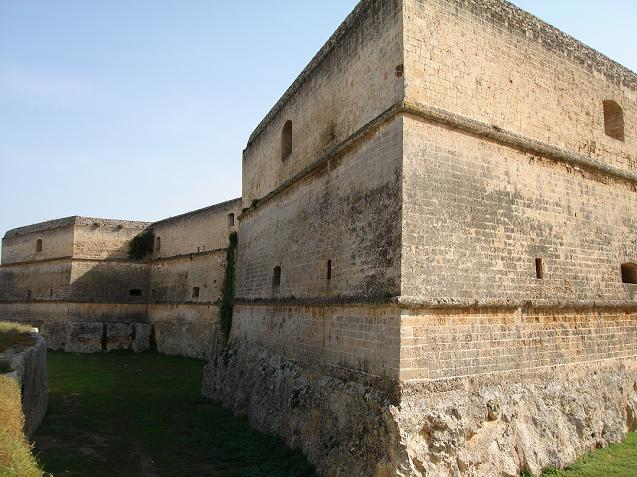
Copertino Castle, Copertino

Province of Bari

- Castello Svevo, Bari
- Conversano Castle, Conversano
- Castle of Charles V, Monopoli
- Santo Stefano Castle, Monopoli
- Castello Normanno-Svevo, Sannicandro di Bari
- Castello Normanno, Terlizzi
- Altamura Castle, Altamura

Province of Barletta-Andria-Trani

- Castel del Monte, Andria
- Barletta Castle, Barletta
- Castello Normanno, Spinazzola
- Castello Svevo, Trani

Province of Brindisi

- Castello Grande, Brindisi
- Forte a Mare, Brindisi
- Francavilla Fontana Castle, Francavilla Fontana
- Oria Castle, Oria, Apulia
- Castello Dentice di Frasso, San Vito dei Normanni

Province of Foggia

- Lucera Castle, Lucera
- Manfredonia Castle, Manfredonia
- Monte Sant ' Angelo Castle, Monte Sant'Angelo
- San Nicandro Garganico Castle, San Nicandro Garganico

Province of Lecce

- Copertino Castle, Copertino
- Gallipoli Castle, Gallipoli
- Castle of Charles V, Lecce
- Melendugno Castle, Melendugno
- Castello Aragonese, Otranto
- Acaya Castle, Vernole
- Castle of Ugento, Ugento

Province of Taranto

- Episcopio Castle, Grottaglie
- Aragonese Castle, Taranto

== Basilicata ==
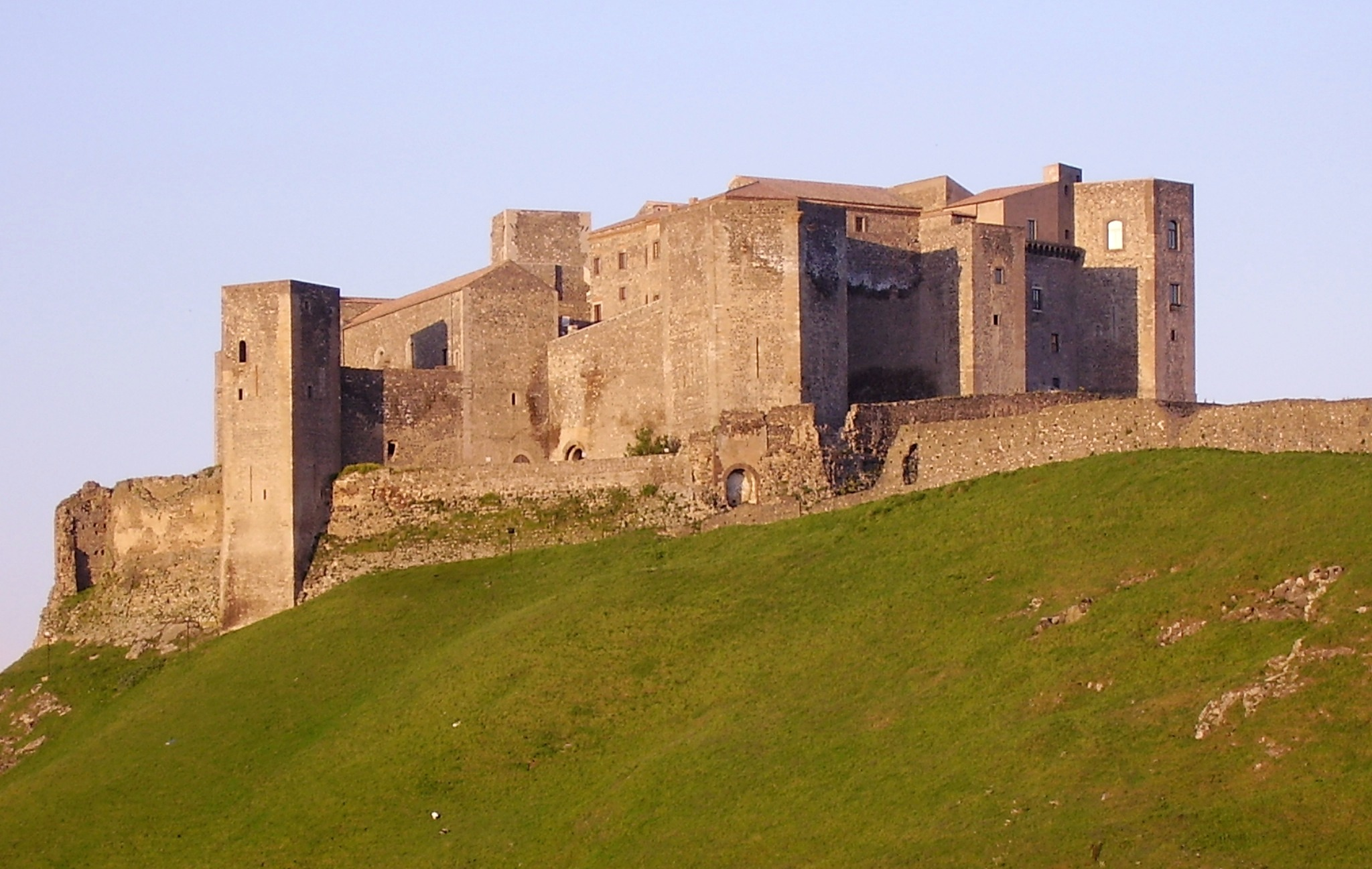
The Castle of Melfi

Province of Matera

- Bernalda Castle, Bernalda
- Castello Tramontano, Matera
- Castello del Malconsiglio, Miglionico
- San Basilio Castle, Pisticci
- Valsinni Castle, Valsinni

Province of Potenza

- Lagopesole Castle, Avigliano, Basilicata
- Laurenzana Castle, Laurenzana
- Castrocucco Castle, Maratea
- Castle of Melfi, Melfi
- Aragonese Castle, Venosa

== Calabria ==
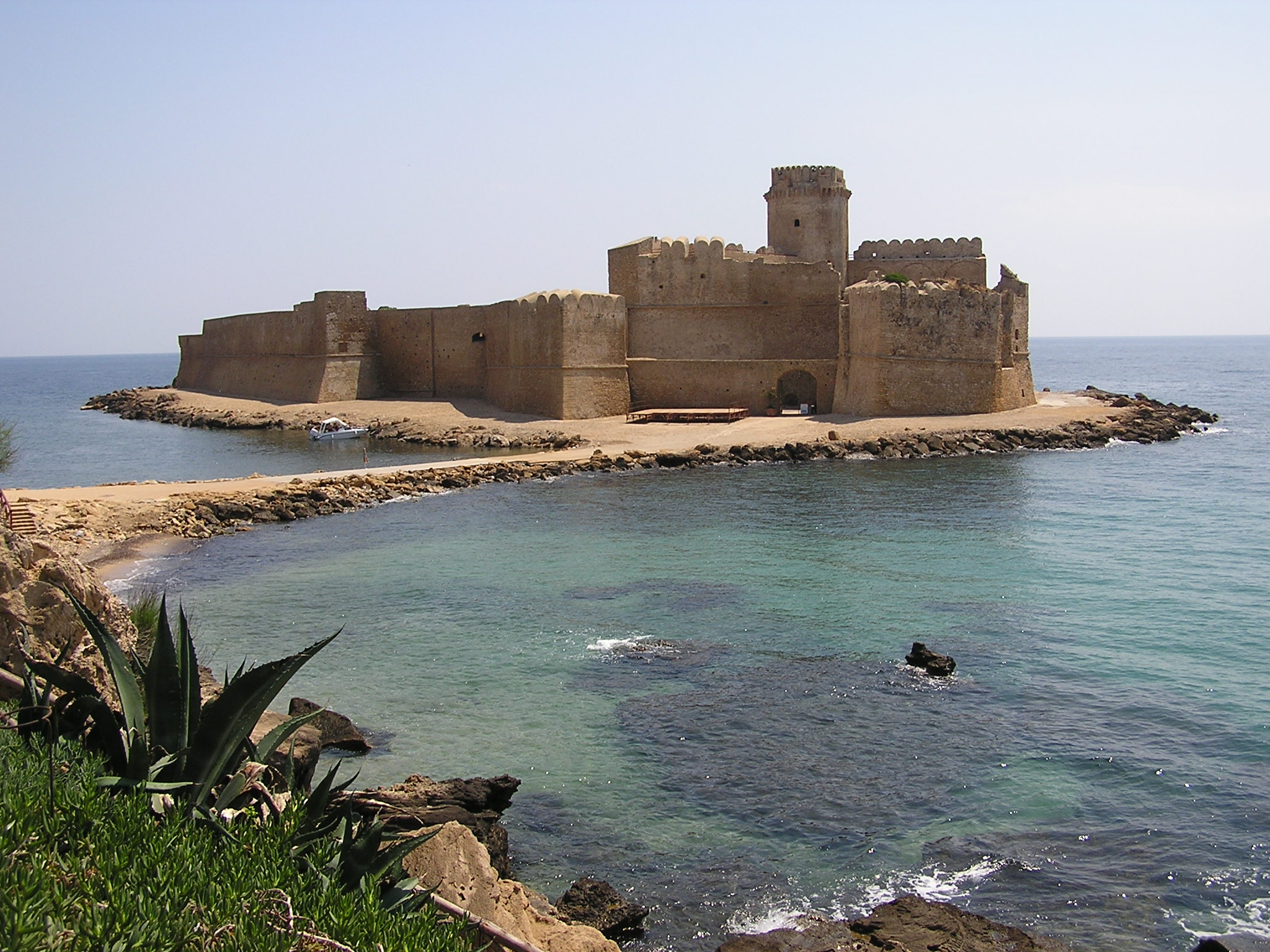
Le Castella, Isola di Capo Rizzuto

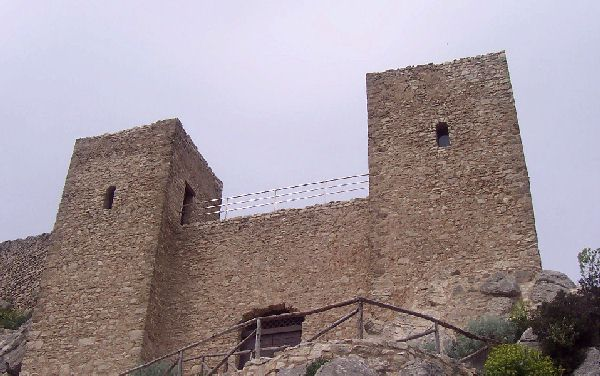
Castle of Sant'Aniceto, Motta San Giovanni

Province of Catanzaro

- Bastione di Malta
- Castello normanno-svevo di Nicastro

Province of Cosenza

- Ducal Castle, Corigliano Calabro
- San Mauro's Castle, Corigliano Calabro
- Acri Castle, Acri
- Castello Normanno-Svevo, Cosenza
- Roseto Capo Spulico Castle, Roseto Capo Spulico

Province of Crotone

- Caccuri Castle, Caccuri
- Charles V Castle, Crotone
- Le Castella, Isola di Capo Rizzuto

Province of Reggio Calabria

- Ruffo Castle of Amendolea, Amendolea
- Aragonese Castle, Castrovillari
- Condojanni Castle, Condojanni
- Castle of Sant'Aniceto, Motta San Giovanni
- Ruffo Castle of Scilla, Scilla, Calabria
- Castello di Squillace, Squillace, Calabria
- Castle of Stilo, Stilo, Calabria
- Altafiumara Fort, Villa San Giovanni
- Horse Tower, Villa San Giovanni

== Campania ==
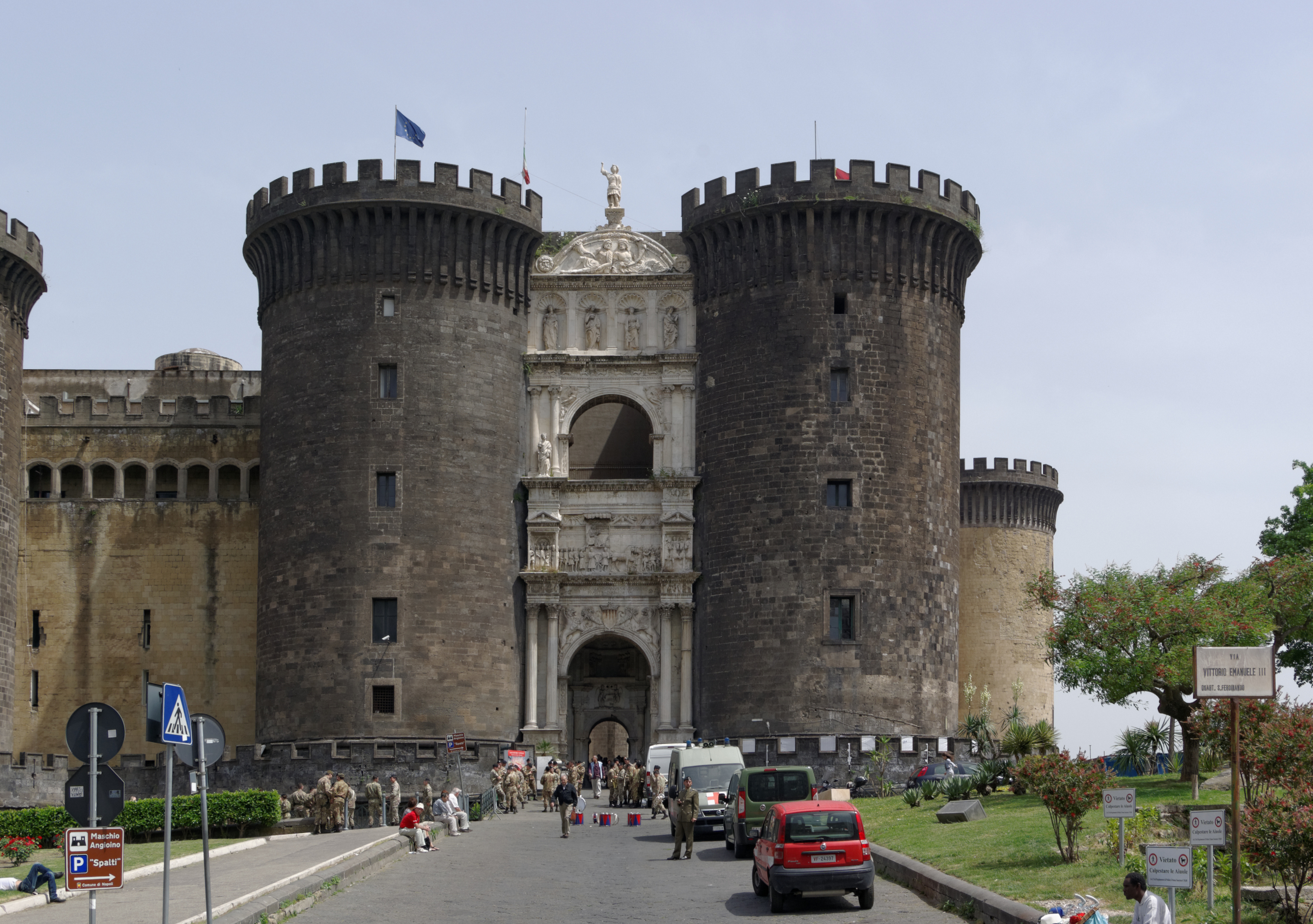
Castel Nuovo (Maschio Angioino), Naples

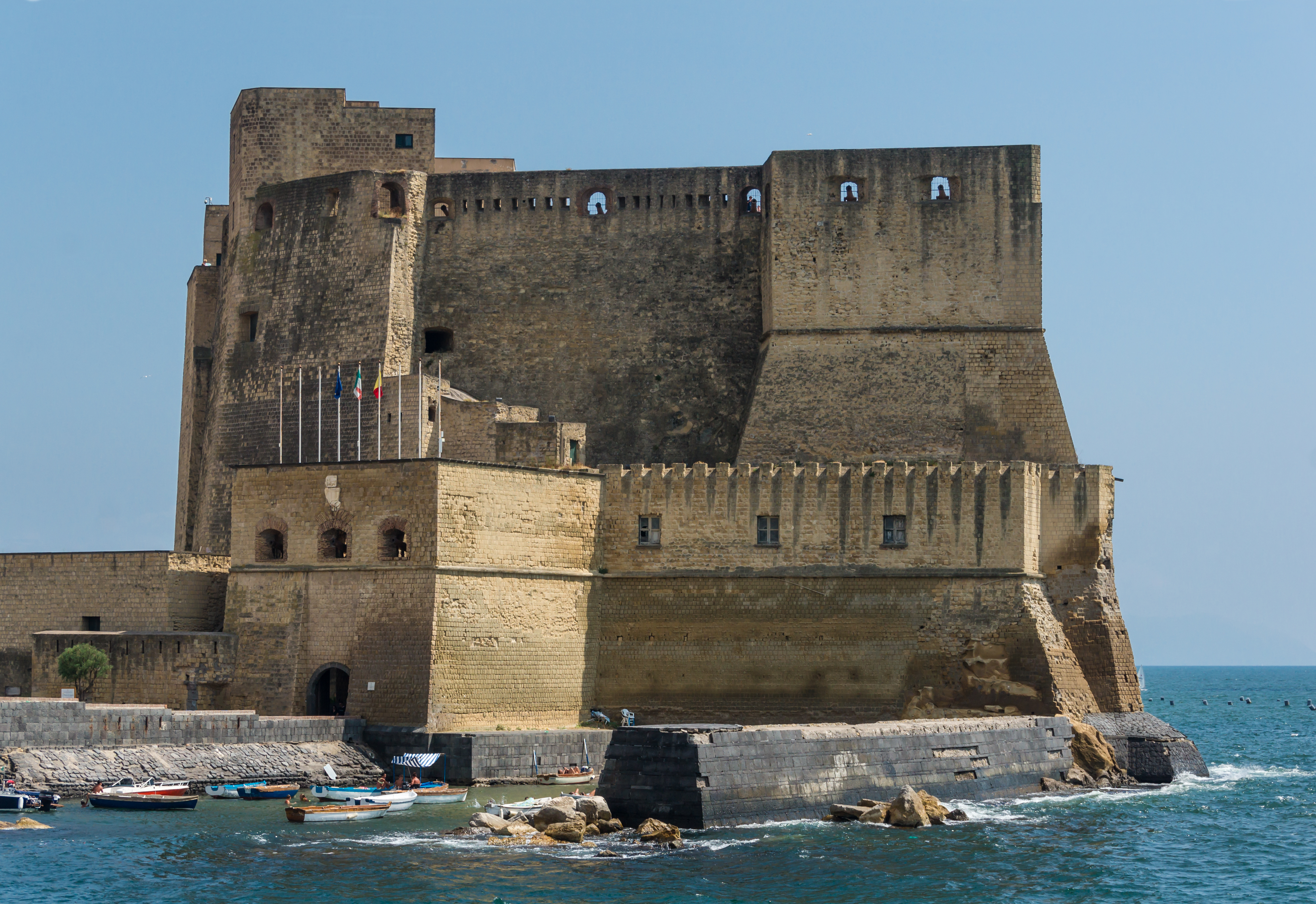
Castel dell'Ovo, Naples

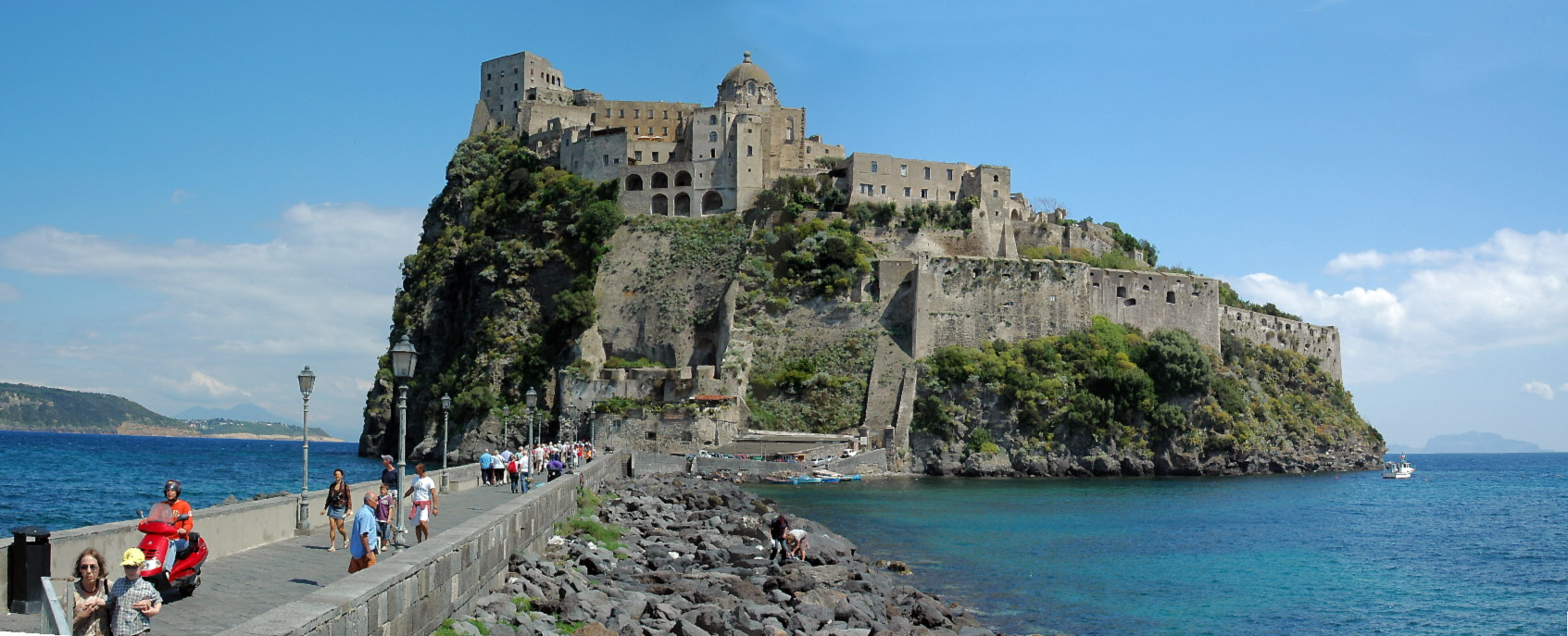
Castello Aragonese, Ischia

Province of Avellino

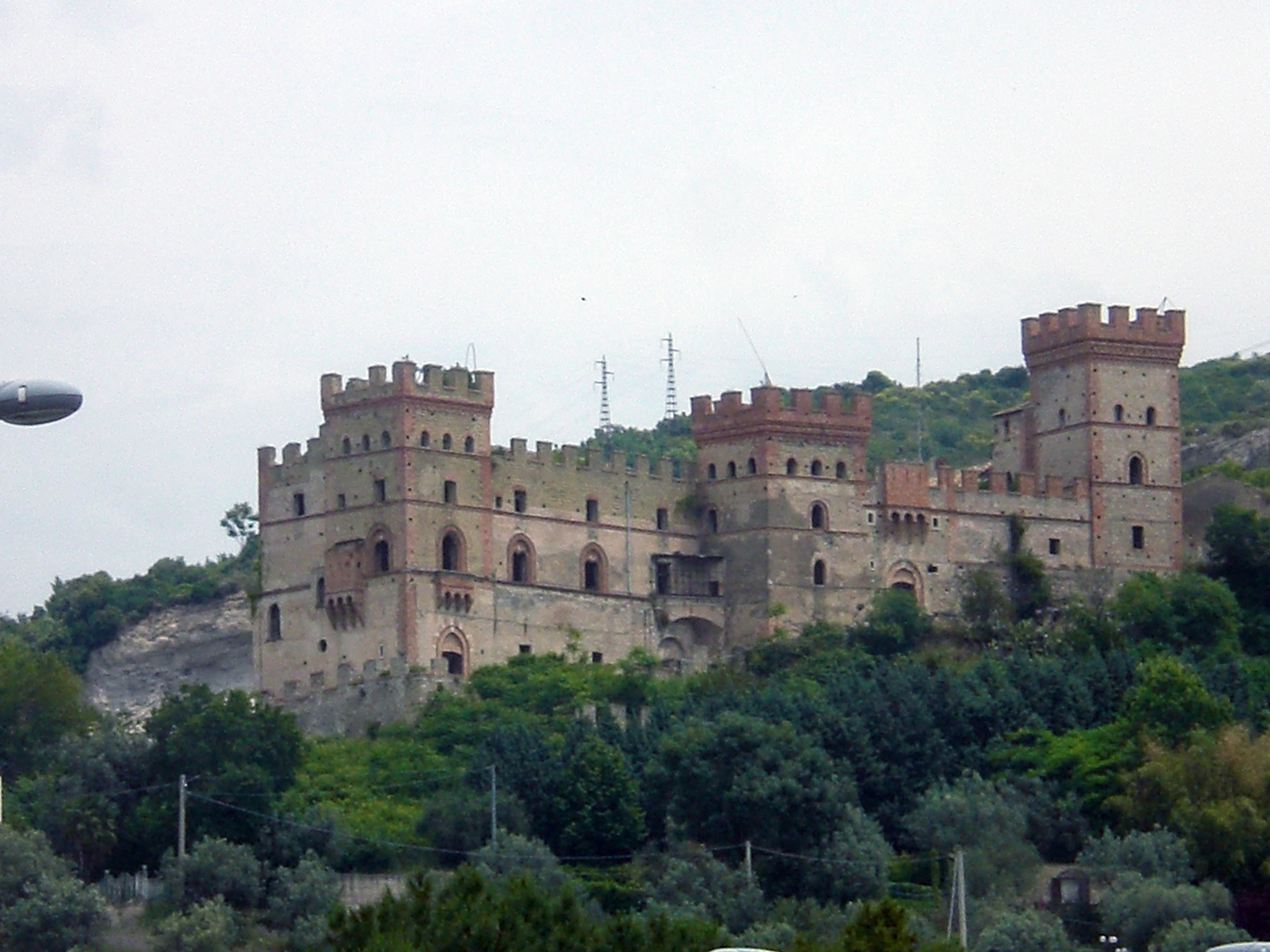
Battipaglia Castle, Battipaglia

- Castel Candriano, Torella dei Lombardi
- Castello di Gesualdo, Gesualdo
- Castello di Rocca San Felice, Rocca San Felice

Province of Benevento

- Rocca dei Rettori, Benevento
- Apice Castle, Apice
- Cusano Mutri Castle, Cusano Mutri
- Faicchio Castle, Faicchio
- D'Avalos Castle, Montesarchio
- Rocca of San Salvatore Telesino, San Salvatore Telesino

Province of Caserta

- Castel Campagnano, Province of Caserta
- Gioia Sannitica Castle, Gioia Sannitica
- Castel Loriano, Marcianise

Province of Naples

- Aragonese Castle, Bacoli
- Castello Aragonese, Ischia
- Aselmeyer Castle, Naples
- Carmine Castle, Naples
- Castel Capuano, Naples
- Castel Nuovo (Maschio Angioino), Naples
- Castel dell'Ovo, Naples
- Sant'Elmo, Naples
- Vigliena Fort, Naples
- Castello di Cicala, Nola

Province of Salerno

- Battipaglia Castle, Battipaglia
- Caggiano Castle, Caggiano
- Gerione Castle, Campagna
- Alegisio Castle, Campagna
- Castello del Parco, Nocera Inferiore
- Castel Terracena, Salerno
- Arechi Castle, Salerno
- Forte La Carnale, Salerno
- Rocca di San Quirico, Roccapiemonte

== Emilia-Romagna ==
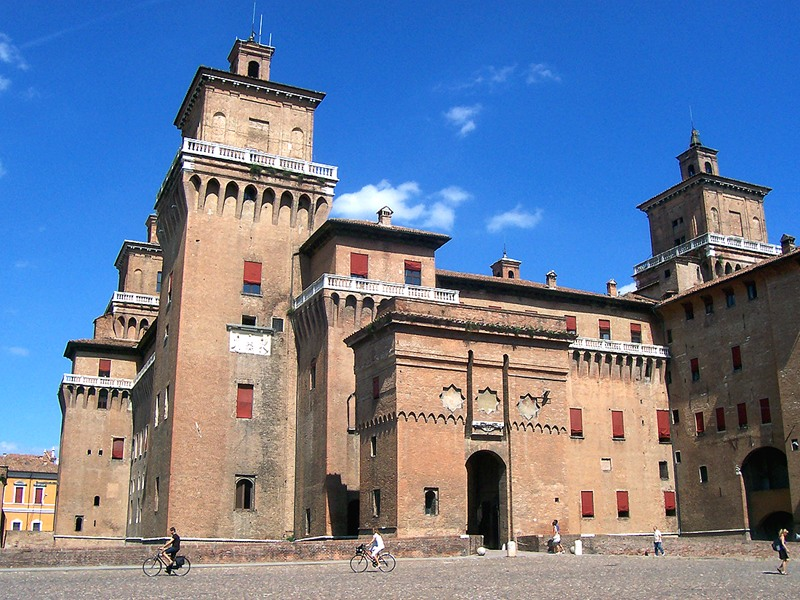
Castello Estense, Ferrara

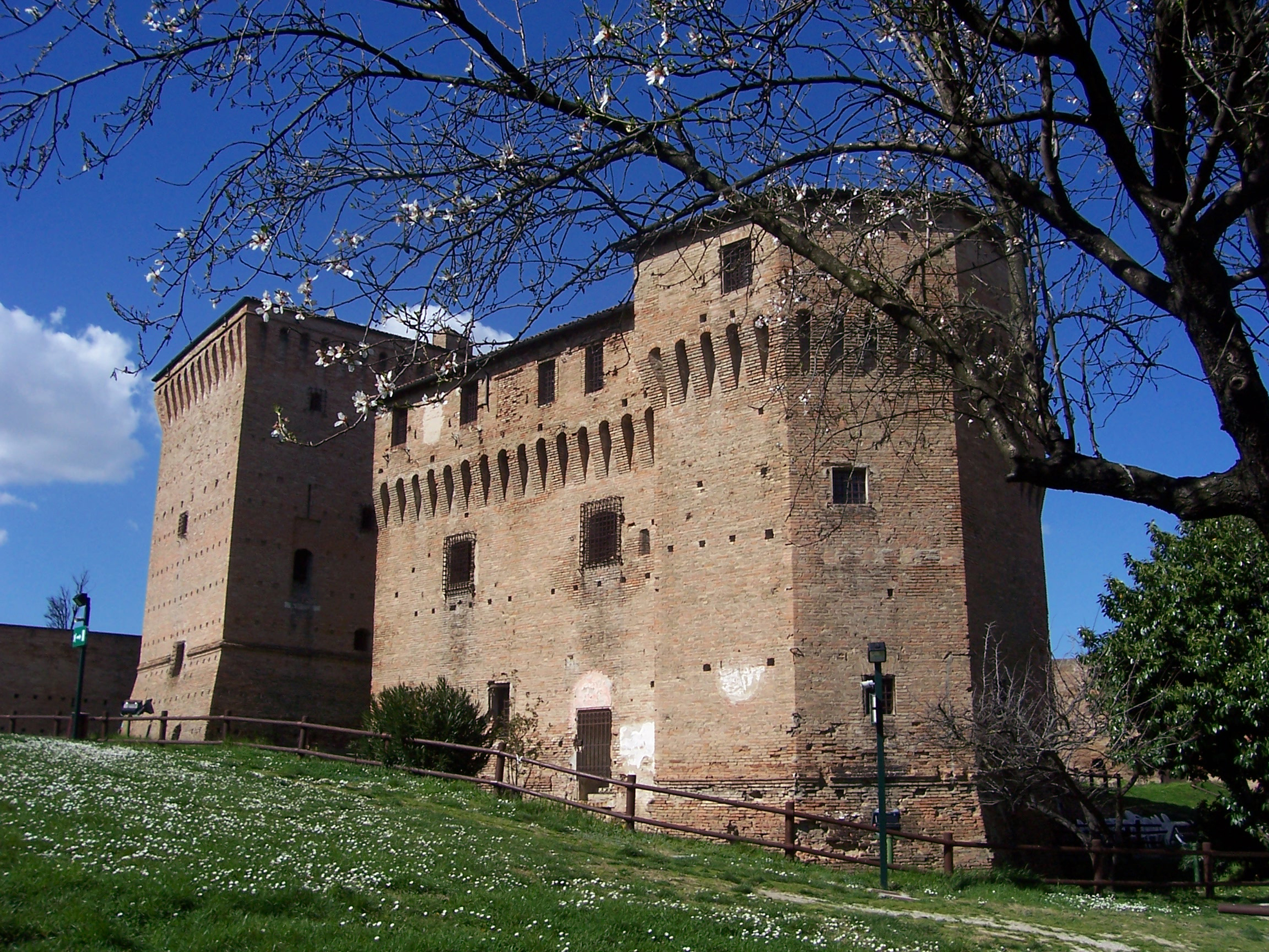
Rocca Malatestiana, Cesena

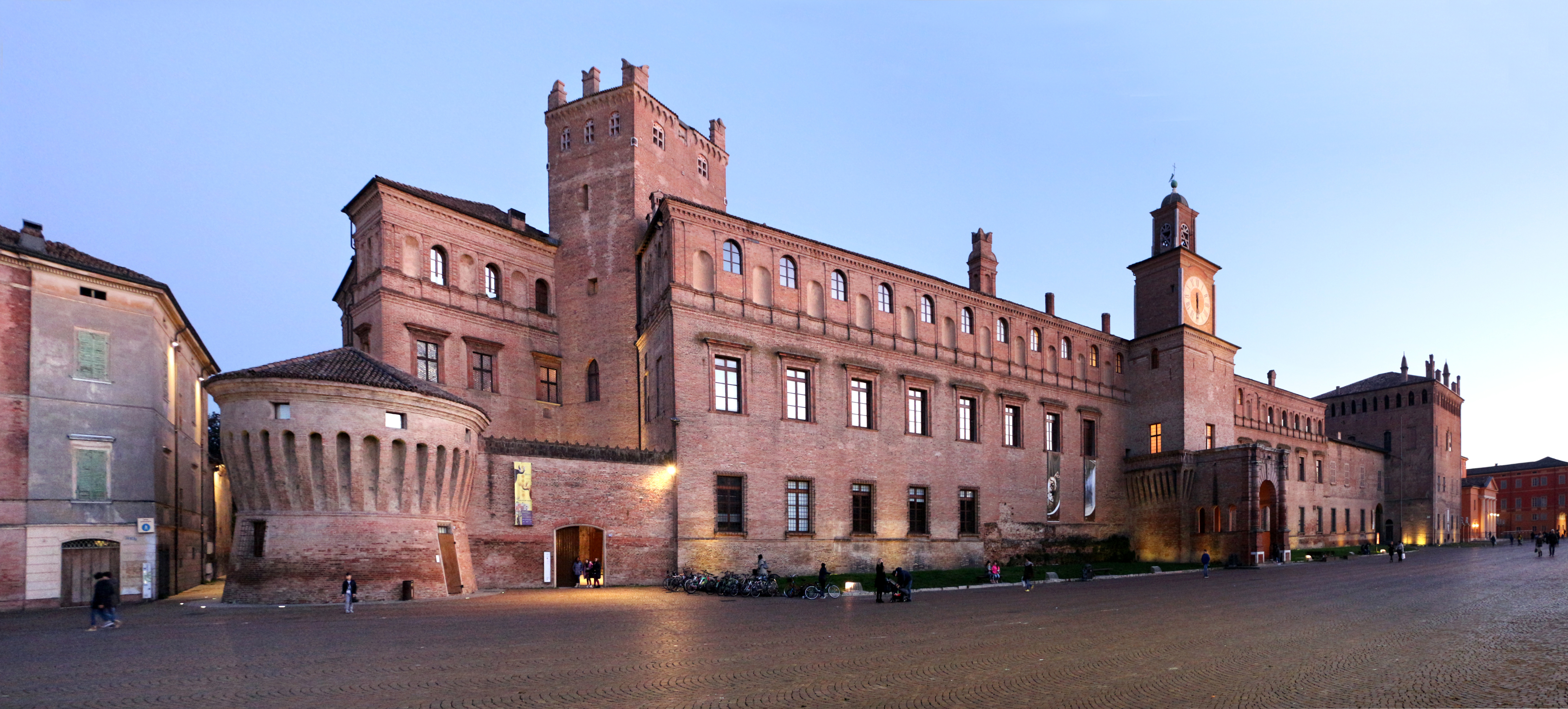
Castello dei Pio, Carpi

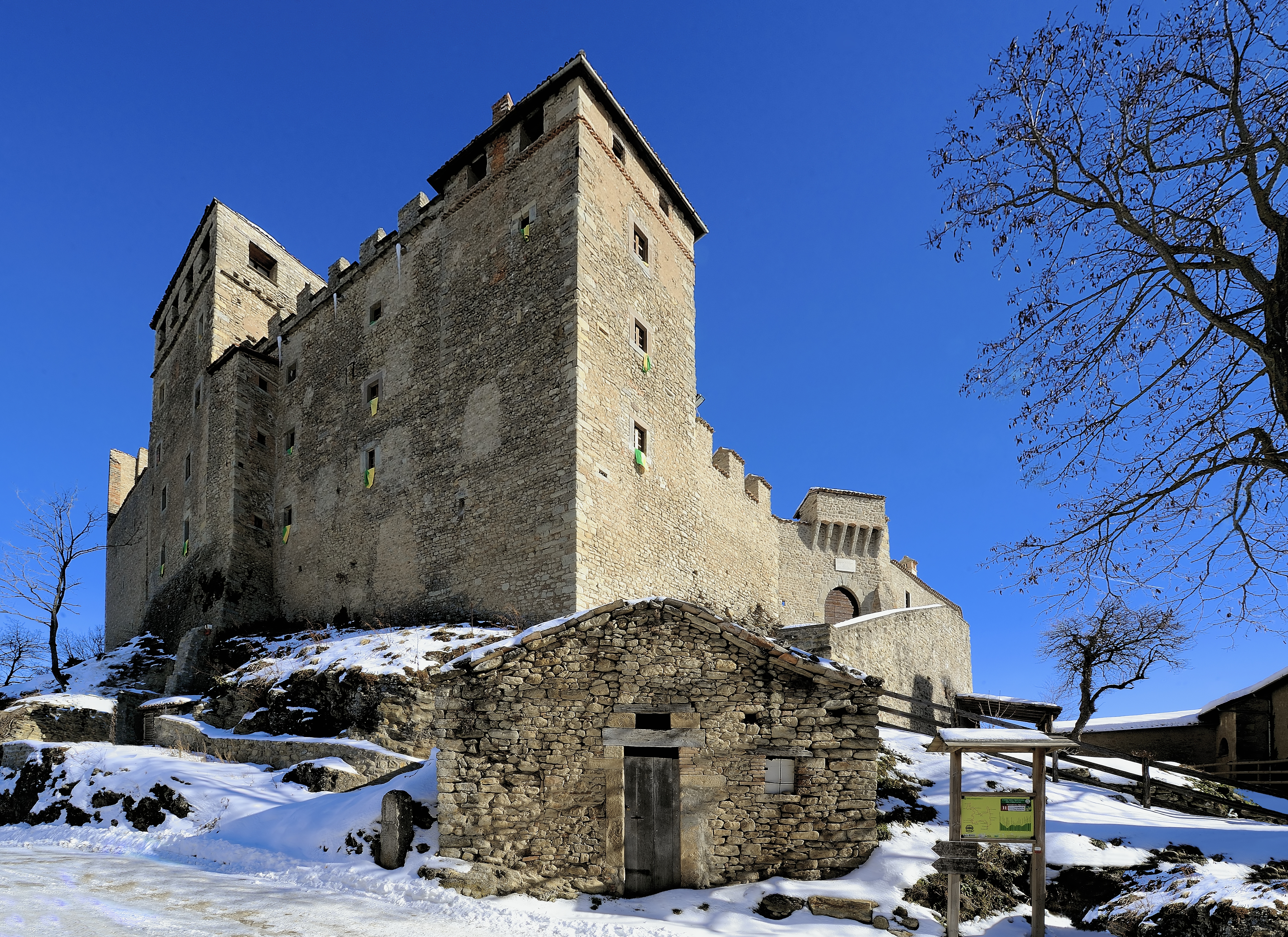
The Castello di Montecuccolo, Pavullo nel Frignano

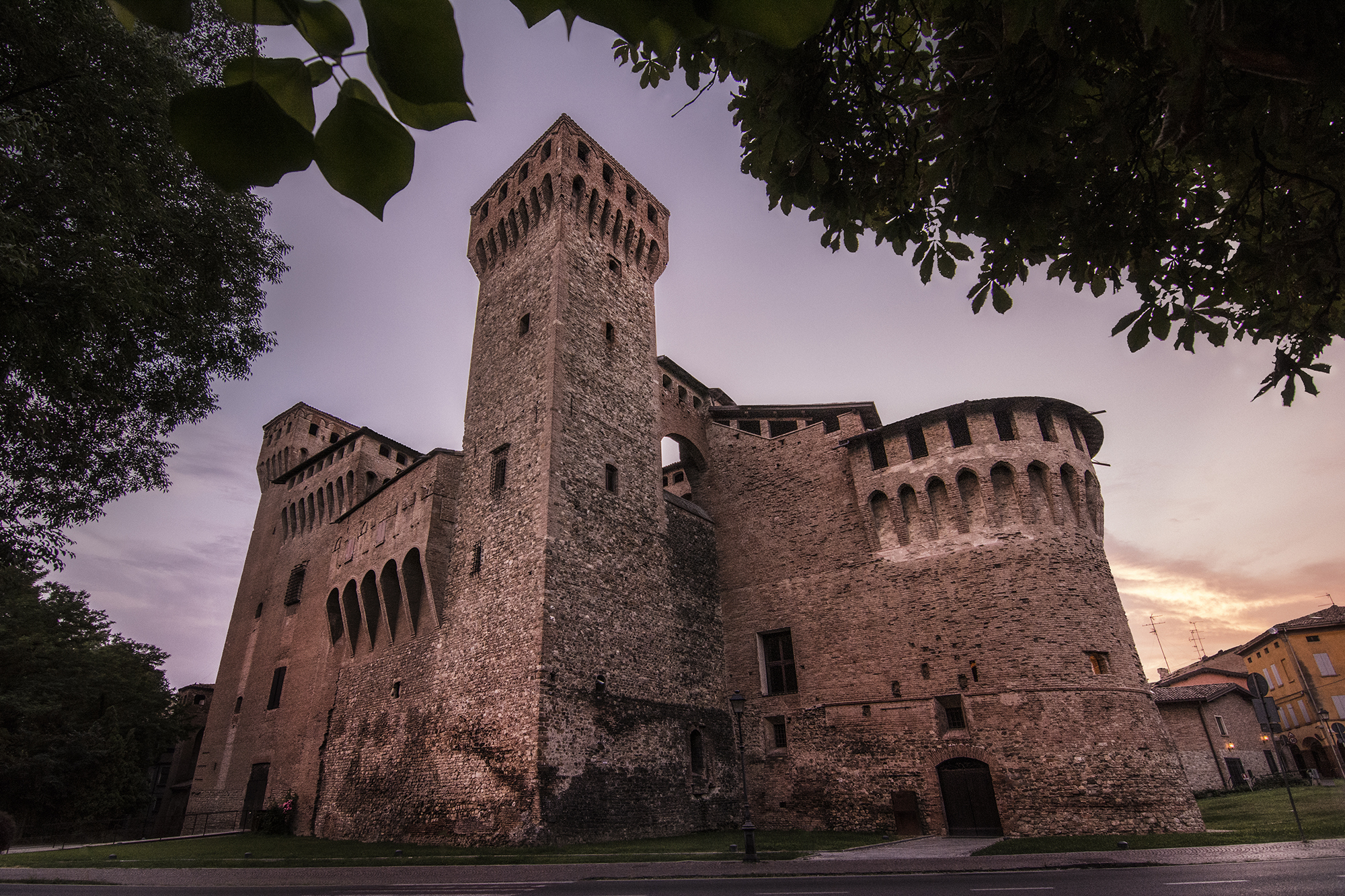
Vignola Castle, Vignola

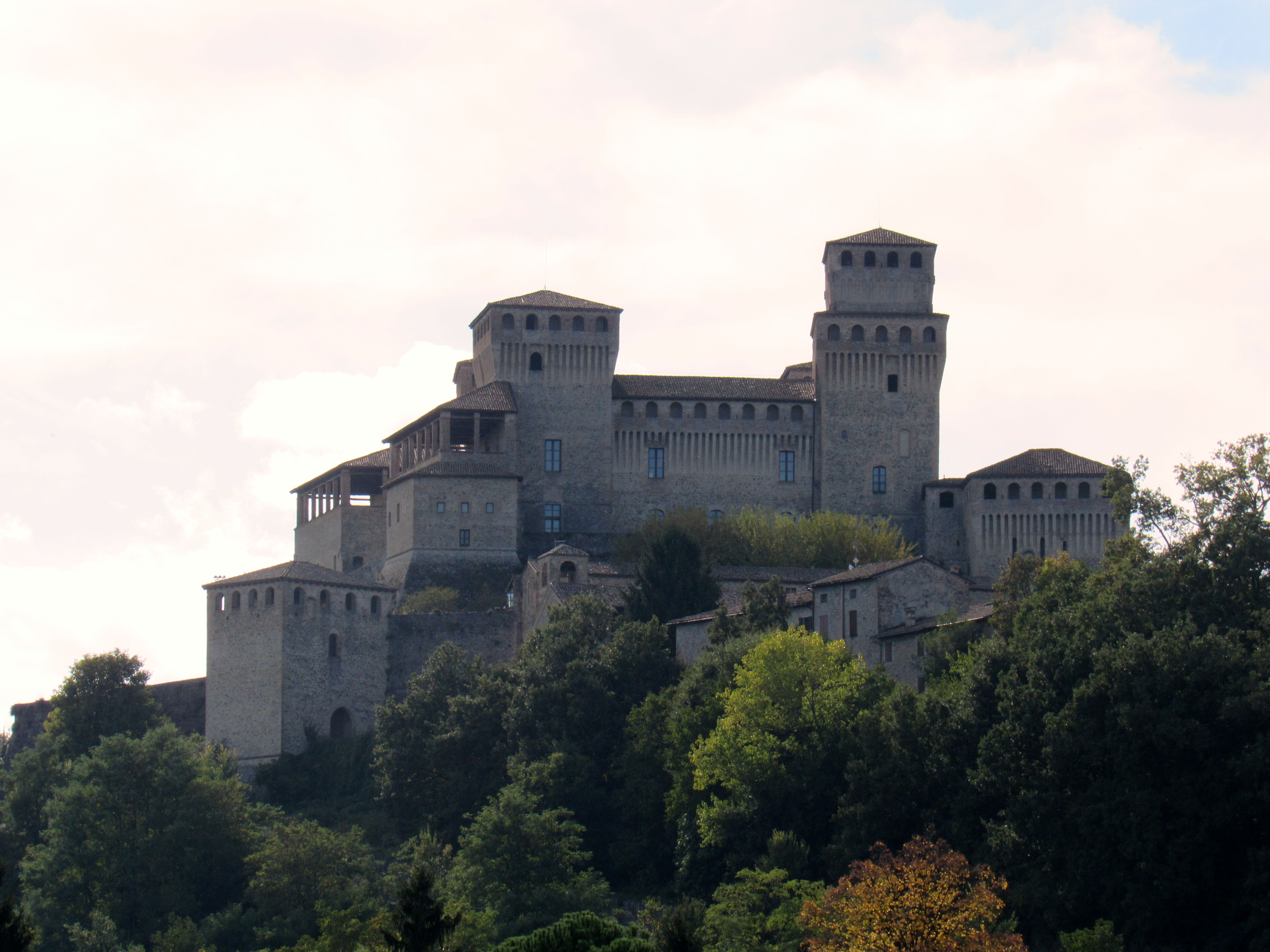
Torrechiara Castle, Langhirano

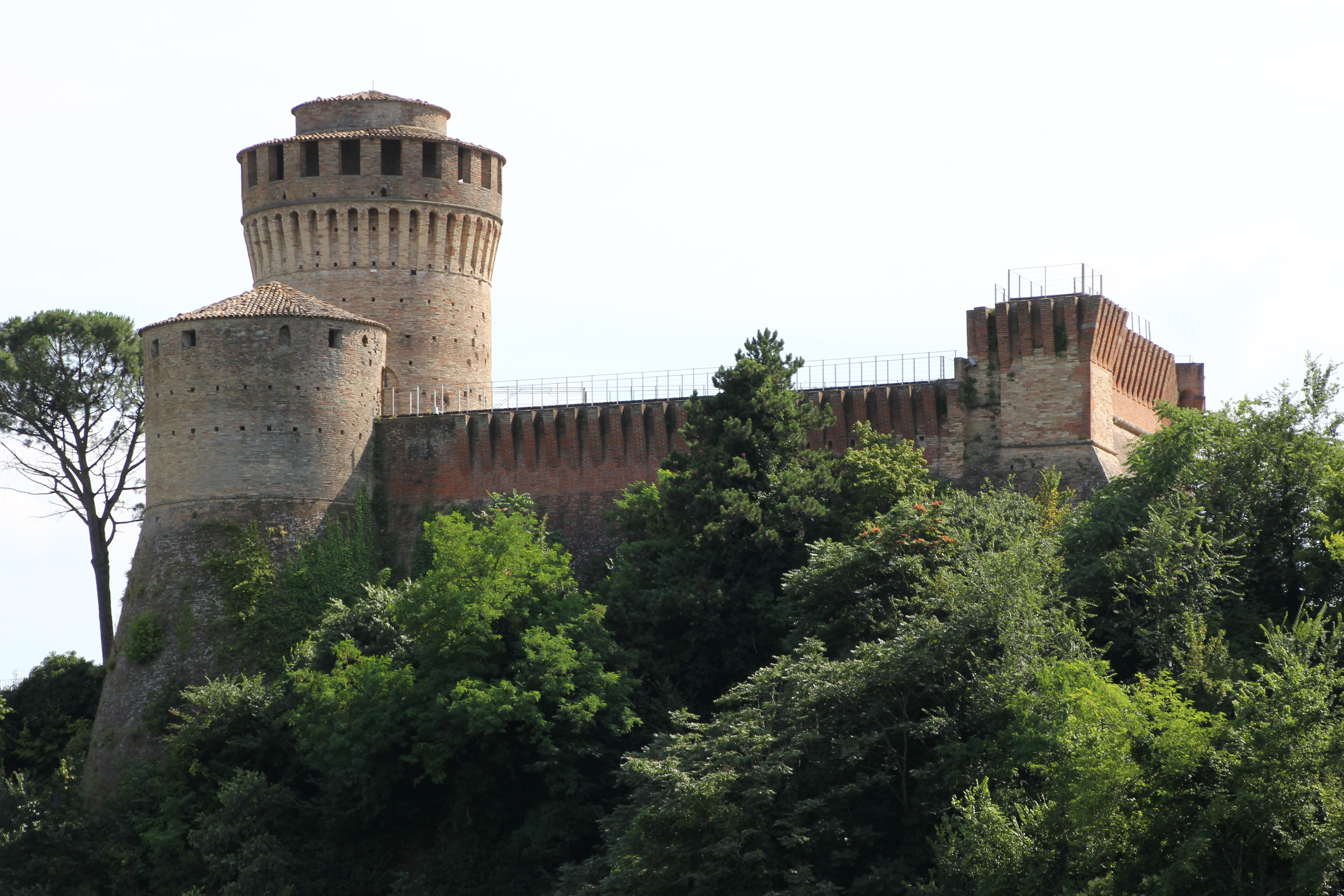
Brisighella Castle, Brisighella

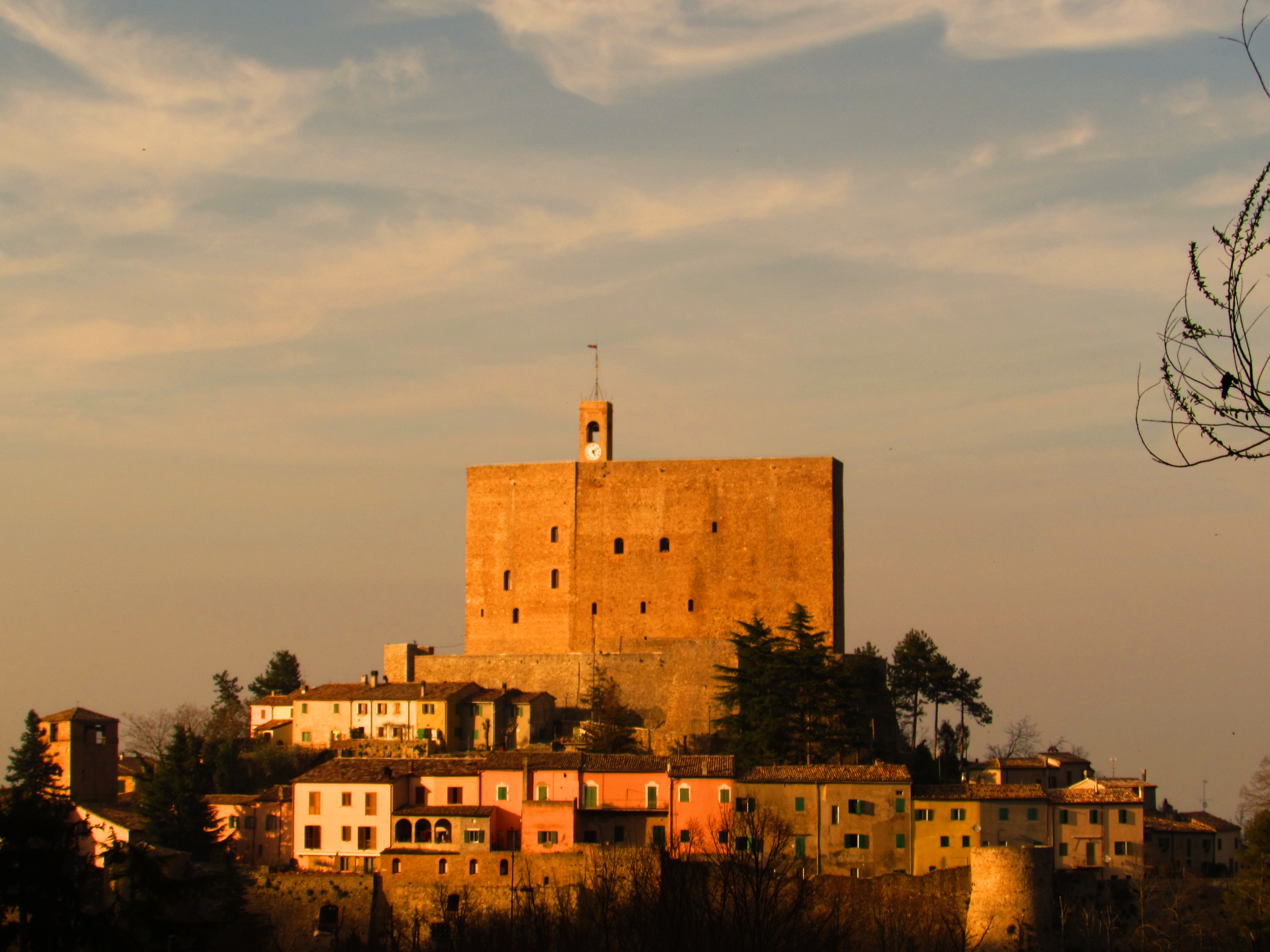
Castello di Montefiore Conca, Montefiore Conca

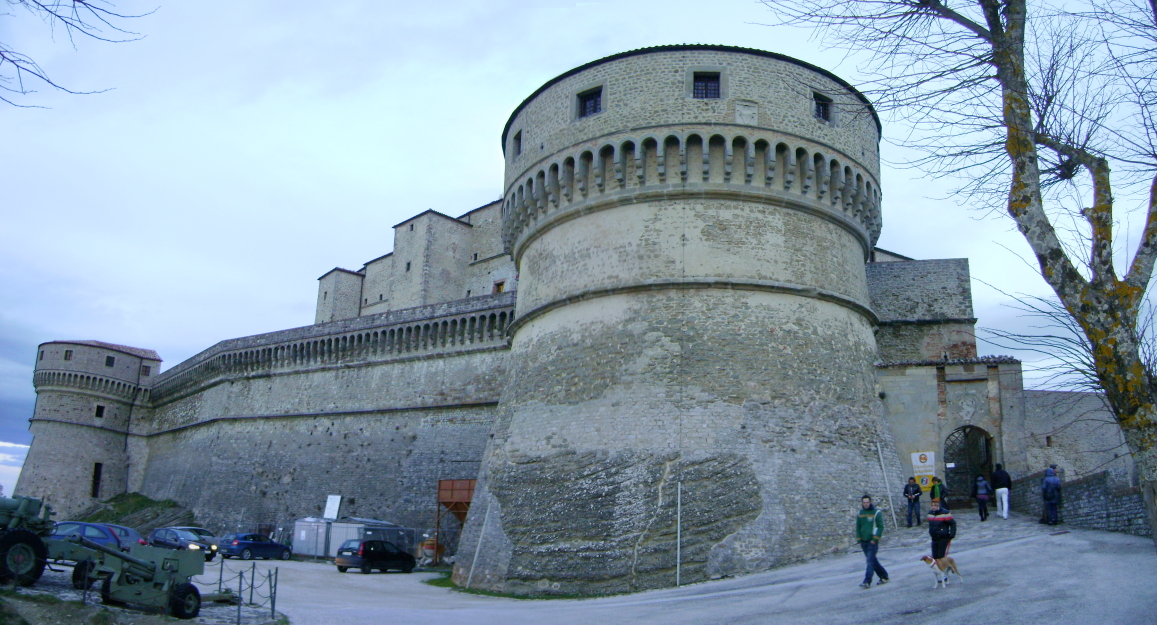
Fortress of San Leo, San Leo

Province of Bologna

- Castello di Galeazza, Crevalcore
- Rocchetta Mattei, Grizzana Morandi
- Rocca Sforzesca, Imola
- Rocca Sforzesca di Dozza, Dozza

Province of Ferrara

- Rocca, Cento
- Castello Estense, Ferrara
- Mesola Castles, Mesola
- Lambertini Castle, Poggio Renatico

Province of Forlì-Cesena

- Rocca Malatestiana, Cesena
- Rocca Dovadola, Dovadola
- Giaggiolo Castle, Forlì
- Monteleone Castle, Roncofreddo
- Rocca di Forlimpopoli, Forlimpopoli
- Rocca delle Caminate, Meldola
- Rocca di Ravaldino, Forlì
- Fortezza Terra del Sole, Castrocaro Terme e Terra del Sole

Province of Modena

- Castello dei Pio, Carpi
- Castello di Montecuccolo, Pavullo nel Frignano
- Castello delle Rocche, Finale Emilia
- Castello dei Pico, Mirandola
- Rocca Estense, San Felice sul Panaro
- Vignola Castle (Rocca di Vignola), Vignola

Province of Parma

- Bardi Castle, Bardi
- Citadel of Parma, Parma
- Castello di Compiano, Compiano
- Castello di Felino, Felino
- Castello di Montechiarugolo, Montechiarugolo
- Castello di Corniglio, Corniglio
- Felino Castle, Felino
- Rocca di Belvedere, Tizzano Val Parma
- Rocca Sanvitale, Fontanellato
- Rocca Sanvitale, Sala Baganza
- Castello di Roccabianca, Roccabianca
- Contignaco Castle, Salsomaggiore Terme
- Rocca dei Rossi, San Secondo Parmense
- Scipione Castello
- Castello di Tabiano Tabiano Castle
- Torrechiara

Province of Piacenza

- Agazzano Castle, Agazzano
- Boffalora Castle, Agazzano
- Castello Malaspiniano, Bobbio
- Castello di Borgonovo Val Tidone, Borgonovo Val Tidone
- Calendasco Castle, Calendasco
- Zena Castle, Carpaneto Piacentino
- Rezzanello Castle, Gazzola
- Rivalta Castle, Gazzola
- Castelbosco, Gragnano Trebbiense
- Gropparello Castle, Gropparello
- Montechino, Montechino
- Rocca d'Olgisio, Pianello Val Tidone
- Monteventano Castle, Piozzano
- Riva Castle, Ponte dell'Olio
- Paderna Castle, Pontenure
- Montechiaro Castle, Rivergaro
- San Pietro in Cerro Castle, San Pietro in Cerro
- Sarmato Castle, Sarmato
- Statto Castle, Travo
- Castello di Vigoleno, Vernasca
- Grazzano Visconti Castle, Vigolzone

Province of Ravenna

- Brisighella Castle, Brisighella
- Cunio Castle, Cotignola
- Monte Battaglia, Casola Valsenio
- Rocca Estense, Lugo
- Rocca Brancaleone, Ravenna

Province of Reggio Emilia

- Canossa Castle, Canossa
- Castello delle Carpinete, Carpineti
- Salame di Felina, Castelnovo Monti
- Bianello Castle, Quattro Castella

Province of Rimini

- Castello di Montefiore Conca, Montefiore Conca
- Castel Sismondo, Rimini
- Castello Due Torri, Torriana
- Fortress of San Leo, San Leo
- Castello Malatestiano Santarcangelo, Santarcangelo di Romagna

== Friuli-Venezia Giulia ==
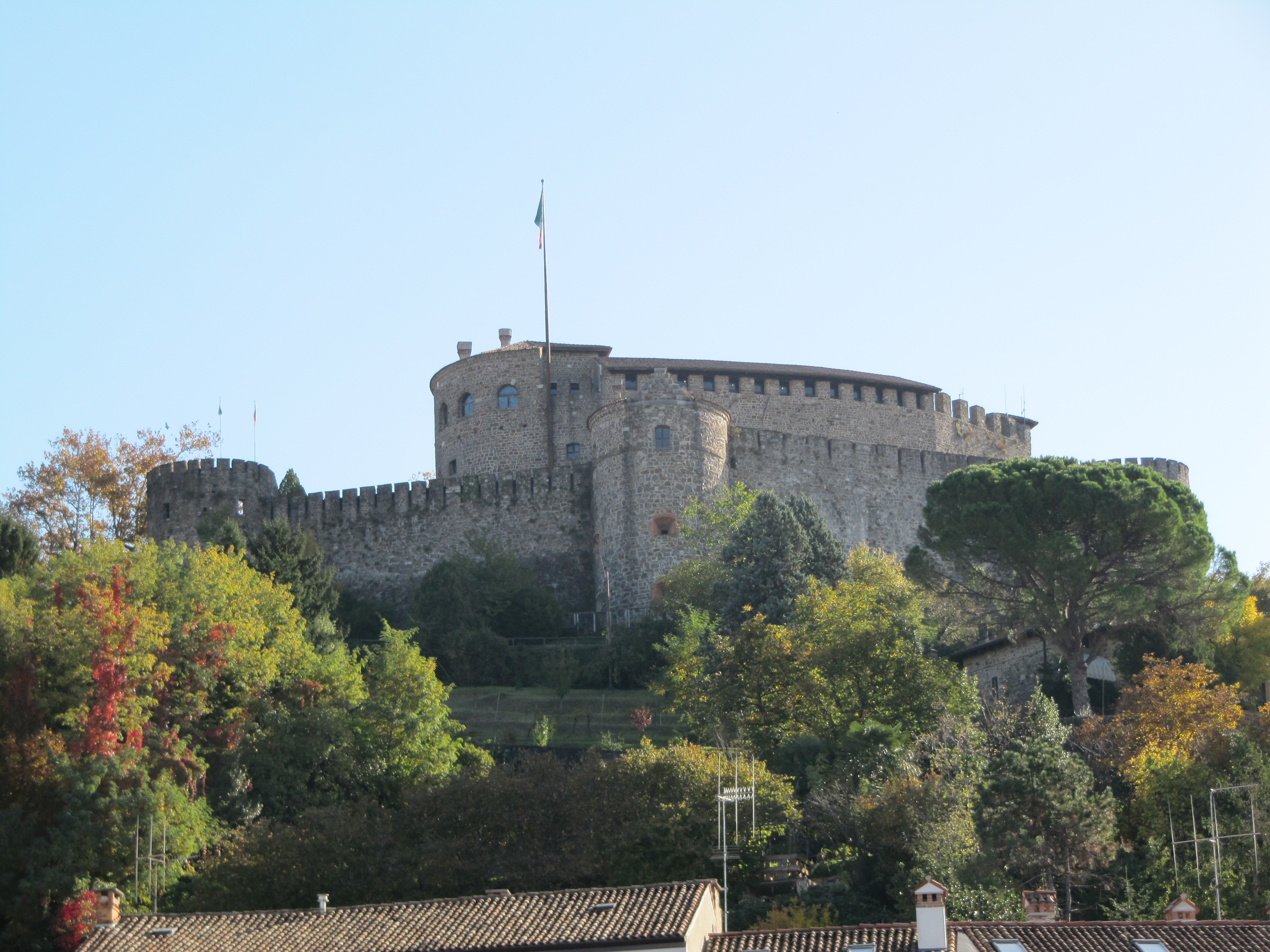
Gorizia Castle, Gorizia

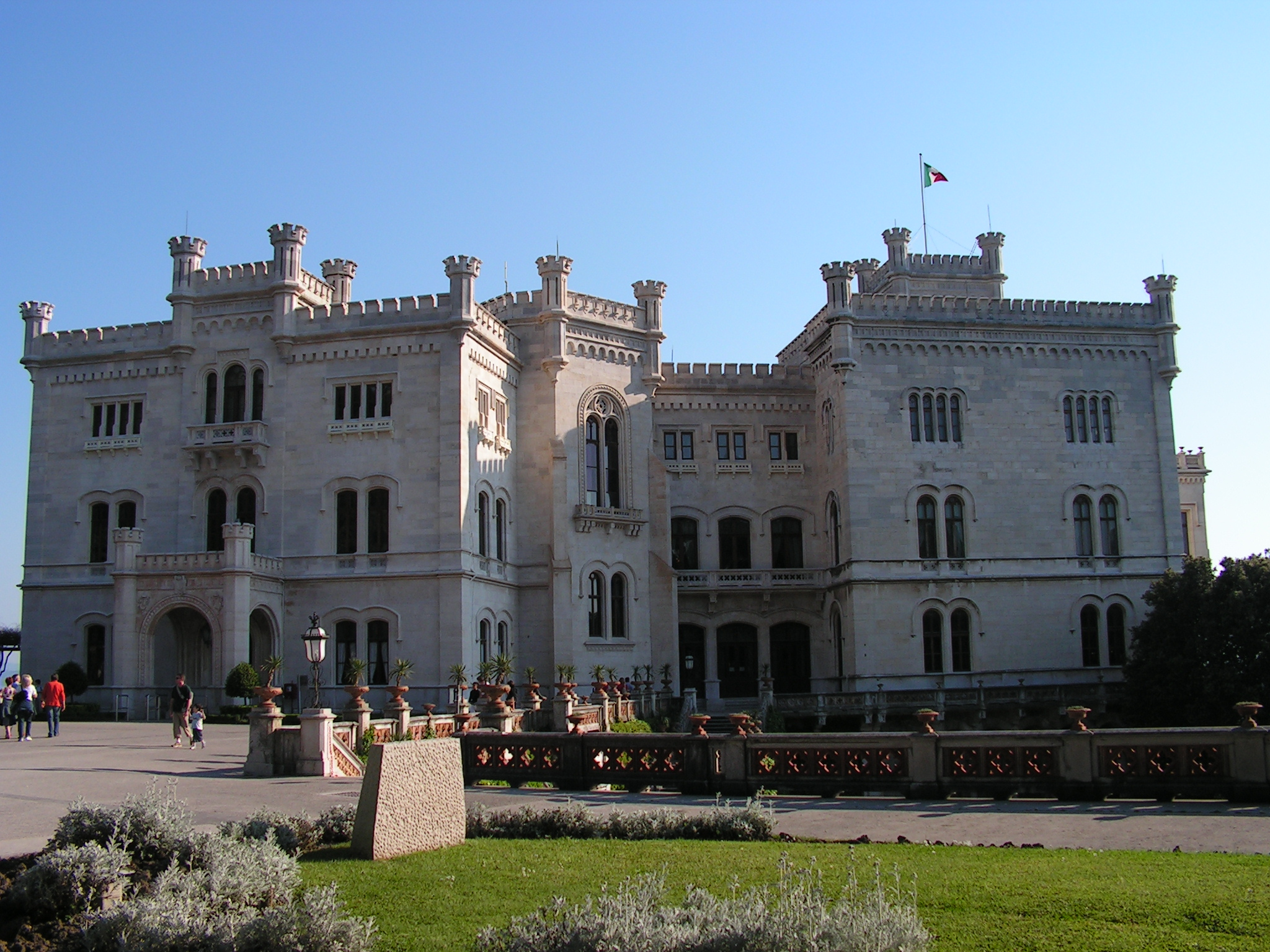
Castello di Miramare, Trieste

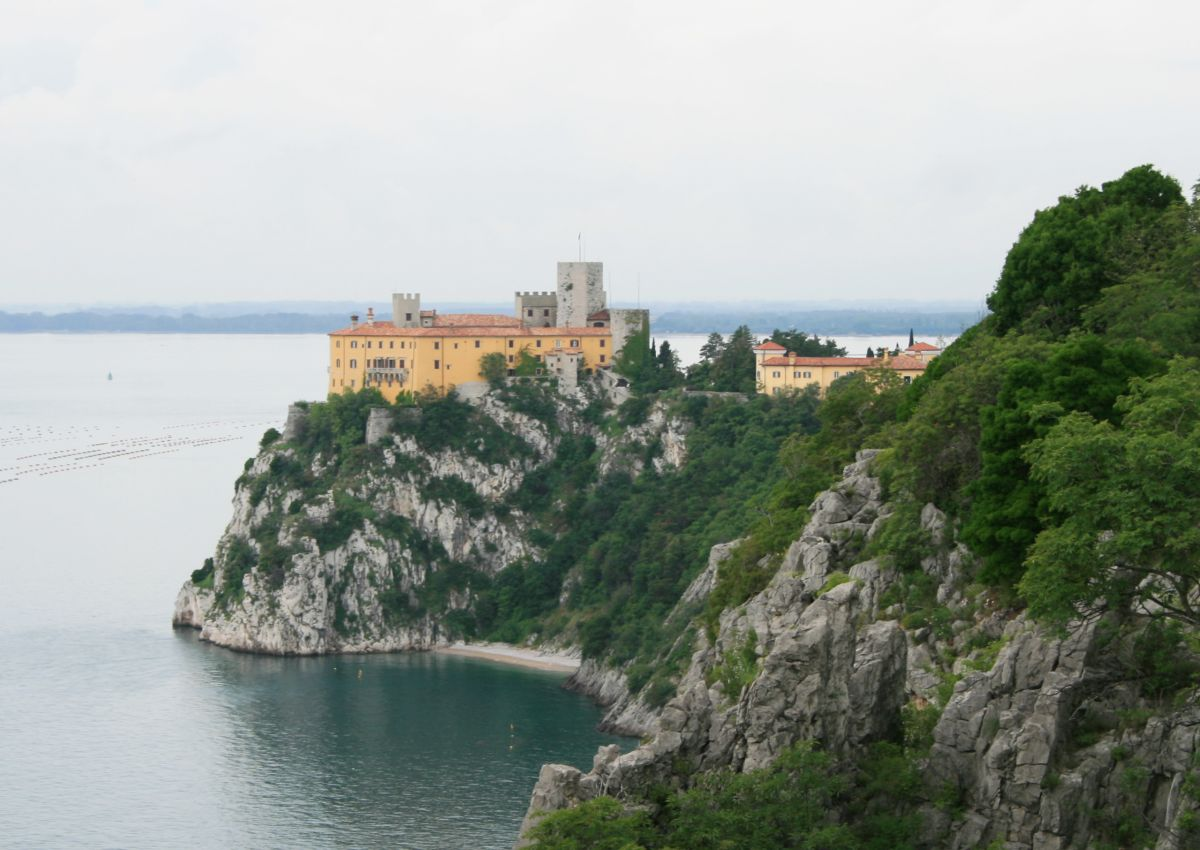
Castello di Duino, Duino

Province of Gorizia

- Castello di Ahrensperg, Biacis
- Castello di Cormons, Cormans
- Castello di Russiz, Russiz
- Castello di Ruttars, Ruttars
- Castello di Trussio, Dolegna del Collio
- Rocca di Monfalcone, Monfalcone
- Gorizia Castle, Gorizia
- Gradisca Fortress, Gradisca
- Rubbia Castle, Savogna d'Isonzo

Province of Pordenone

- Castello d'Aviano, Aviano
- Castello di Caneva, Caneva
- Castello di Maniago, Maniago
- Castello di Montereale, Montereale Valcellina
- Castello di Pinzano, Pinzano al Tagliamento
- Castello di Spilimbergo, Spilimbergo
- Castello di Torrate, Chions

Province of Trieste

- Duino Castle, Duino
- Castello di Muggia, Muggia
- Castello di San Giusto, Trieste
- Castello di Miramare, Trieste

Province of Udine

- Castello di Partistagno, Attimis
- Castello di Sacuidic, Forni di Sopra
- Udine Castle, Udine

== Lazio ==
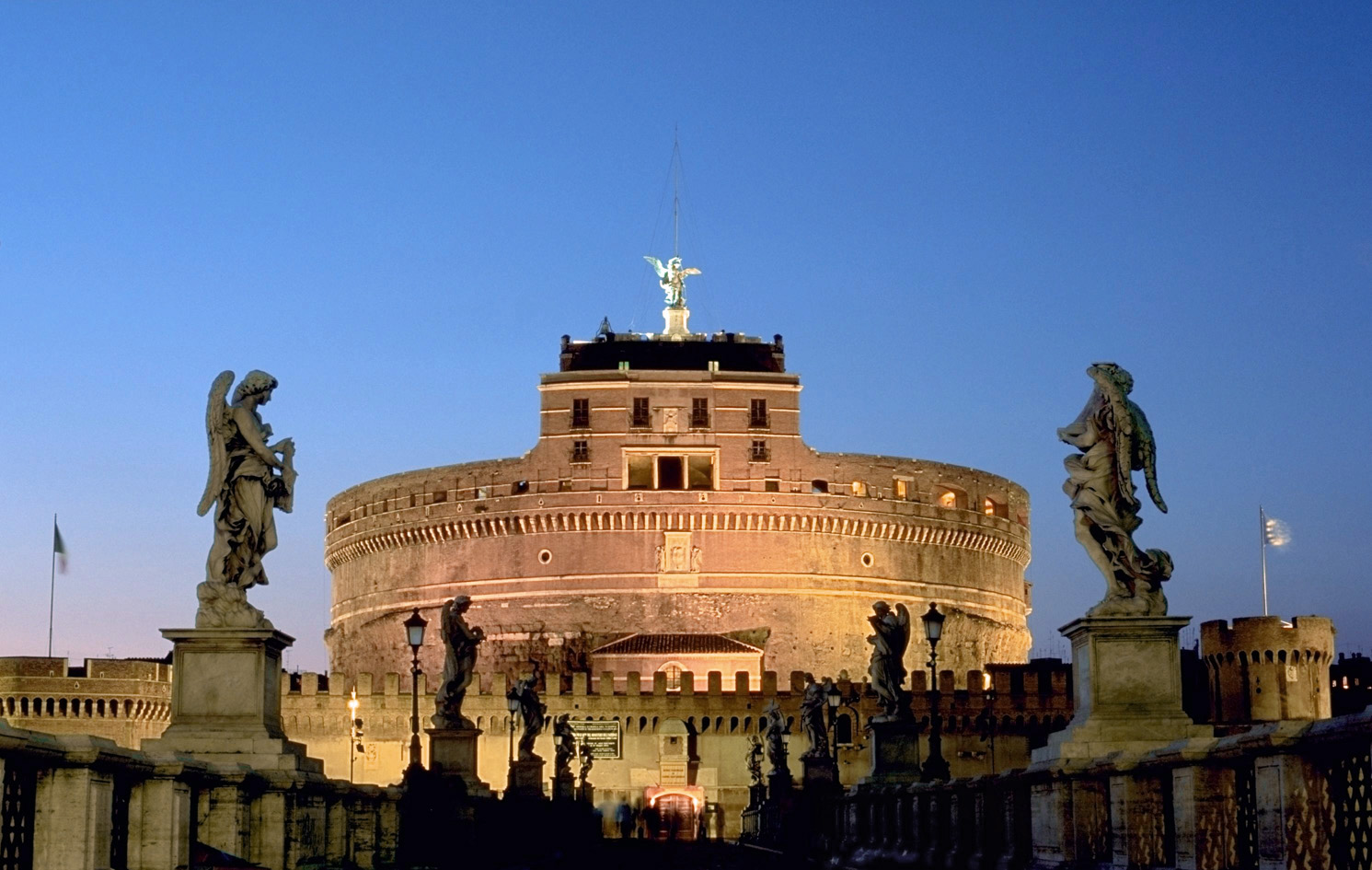
Castel Sant'Angelo, Rome

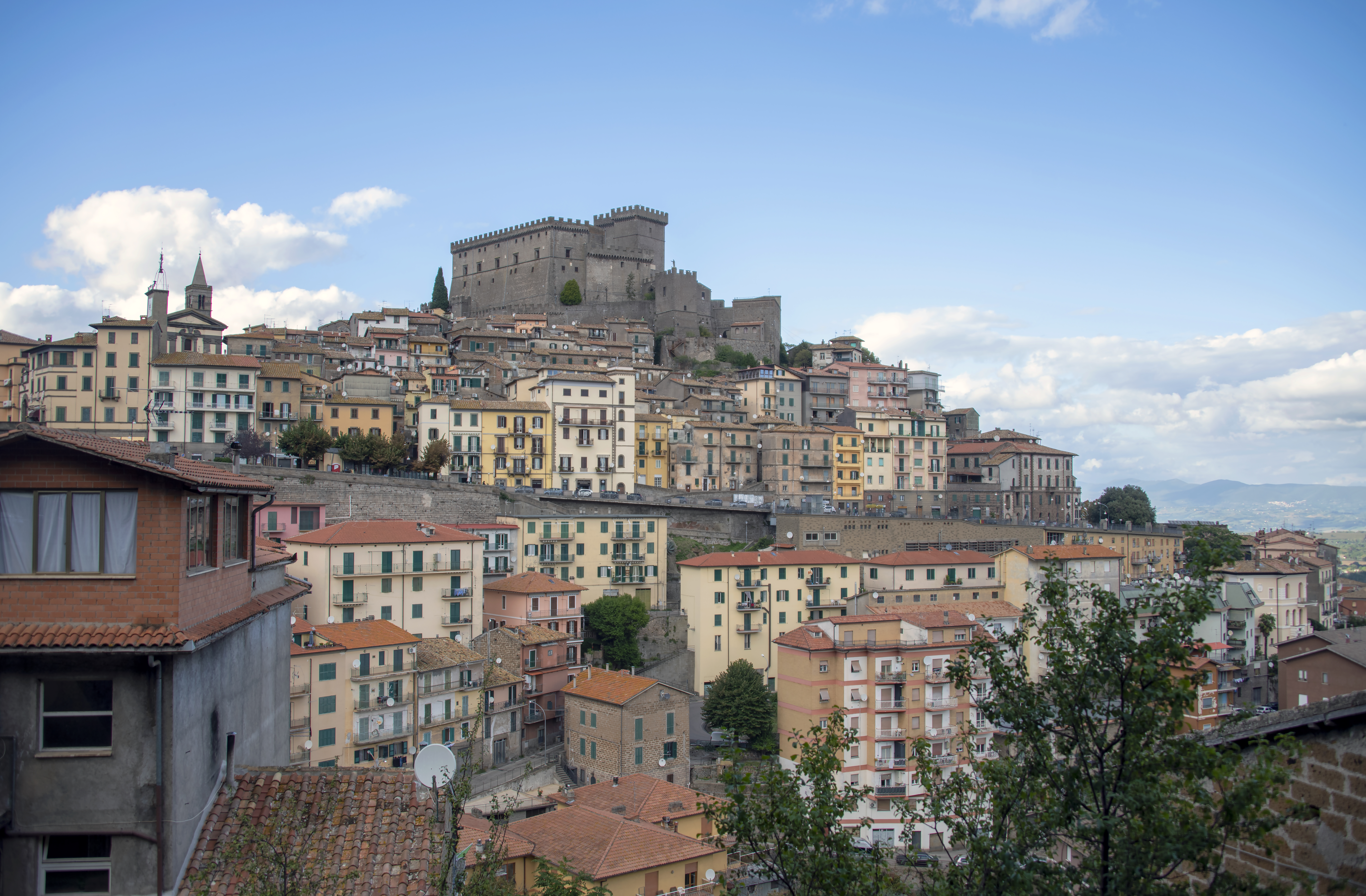
Castello Orsini, Soriano nel Cimino

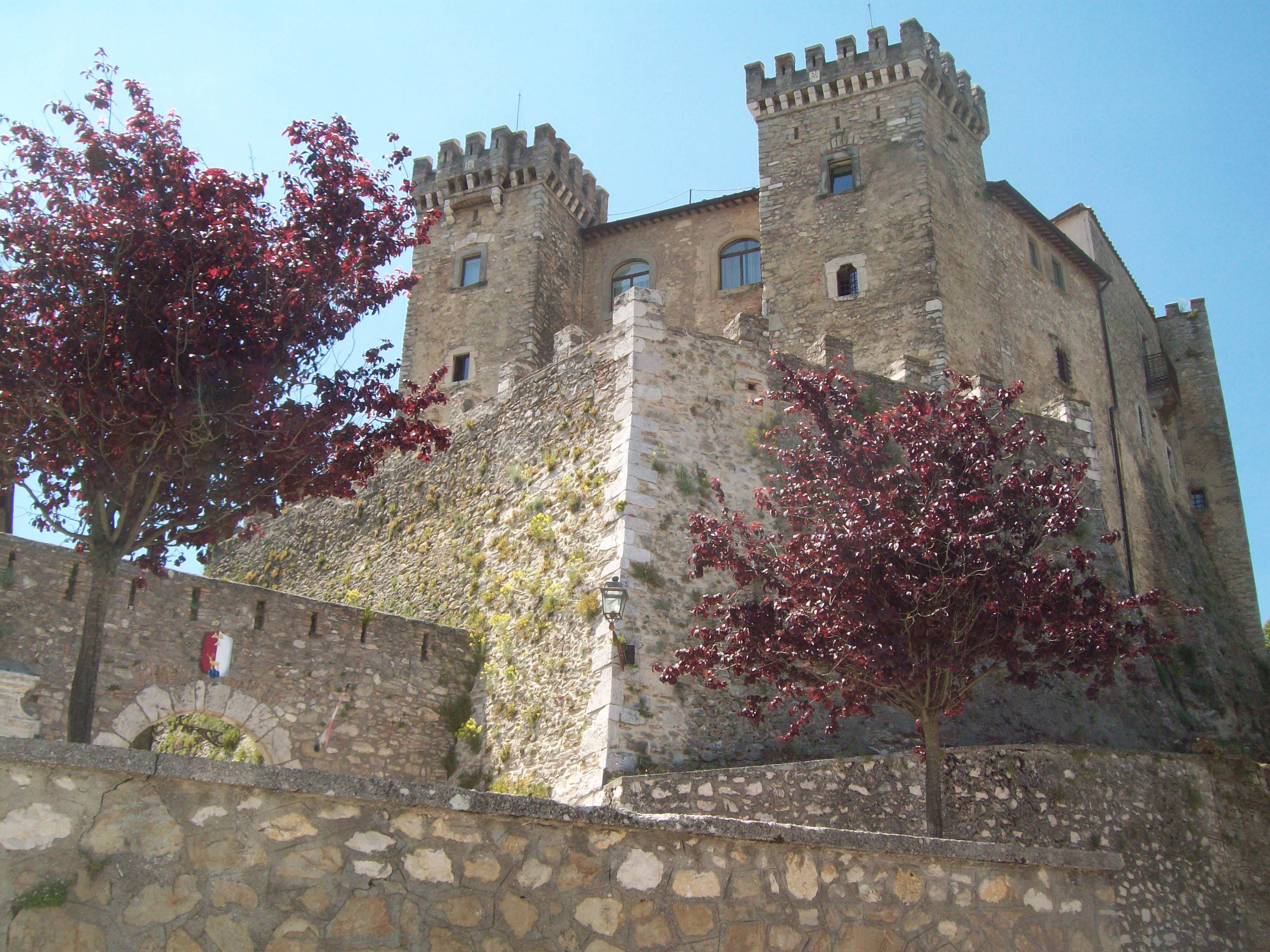
Castello Soderini, Collalto Sabino

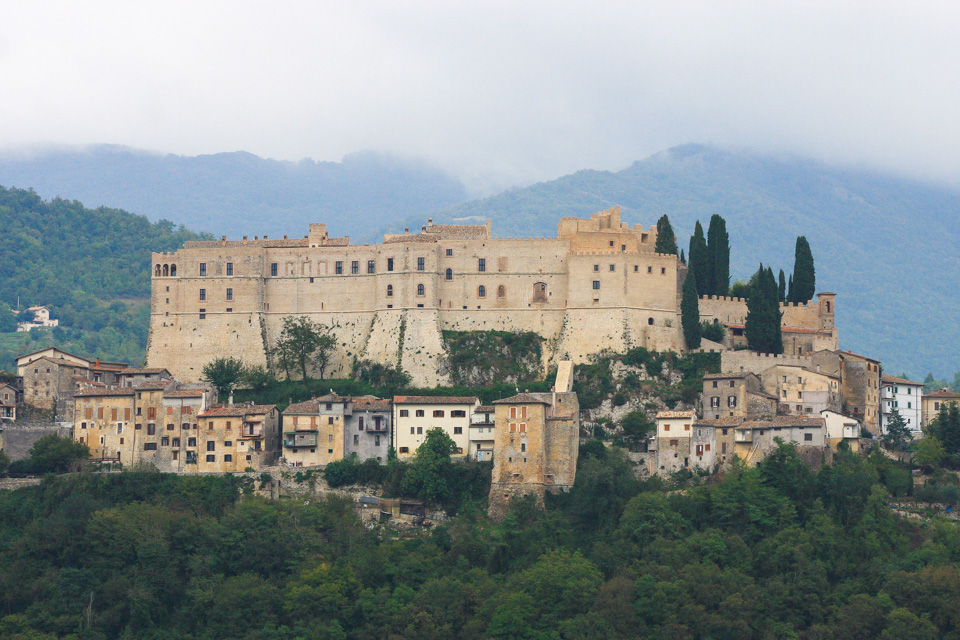
Castello Cesarini, Rocca Sinibalda

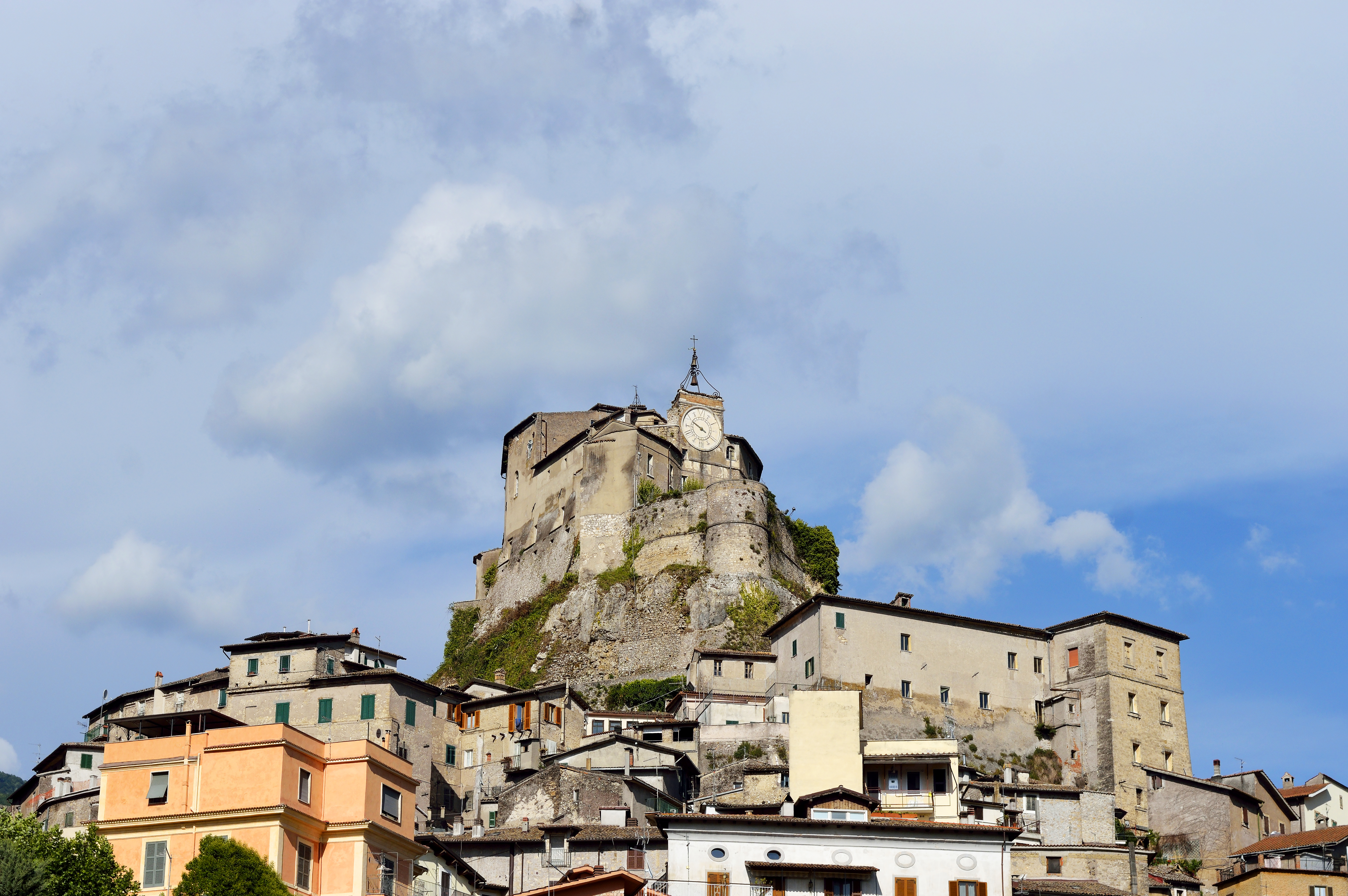
La Rocca Abbaziale

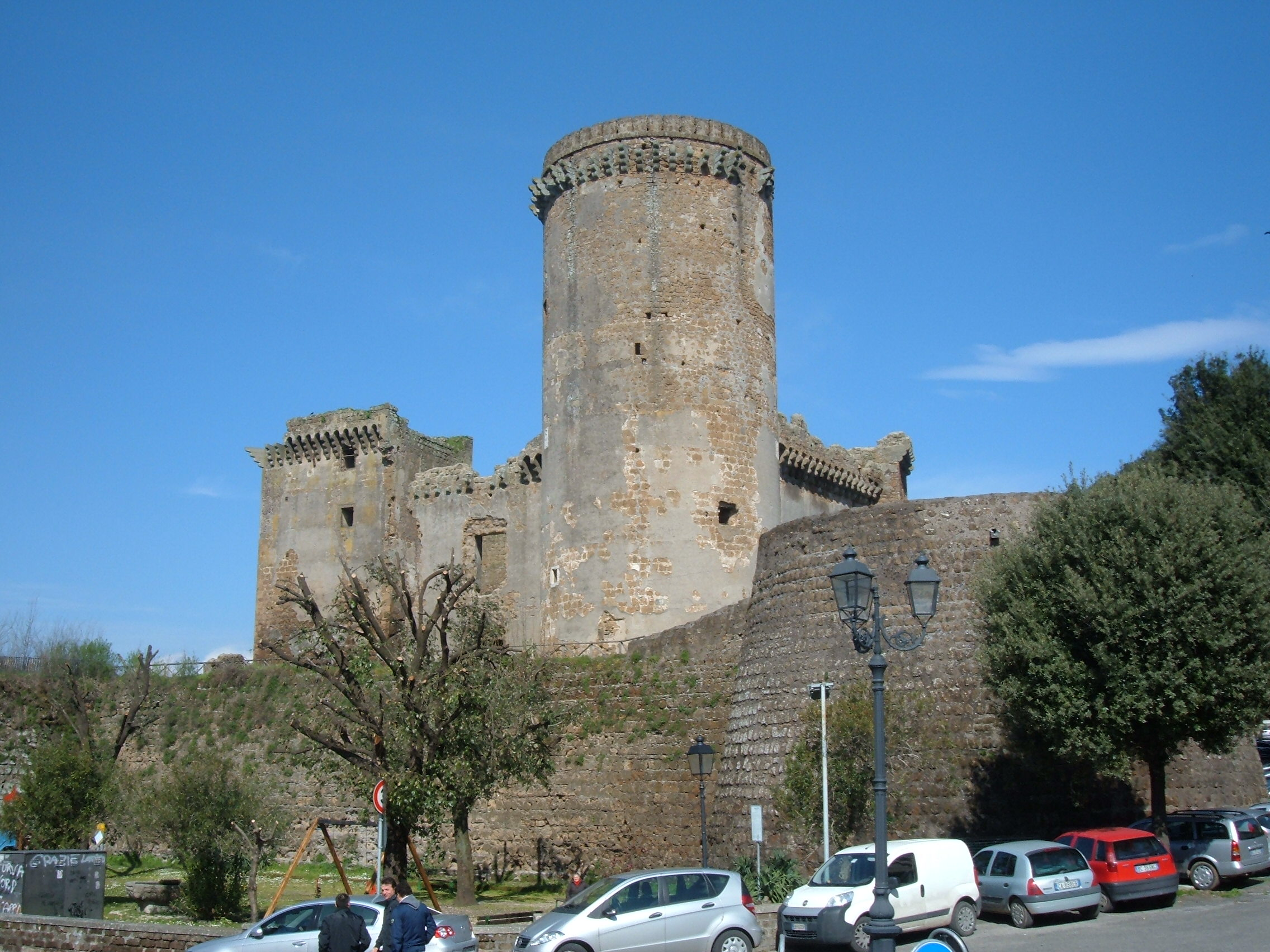
Castello Borgia

Province of Frosinone

- Castello Cantelmo, Alvito
- Castello di Isoletta, Arce
- Torre di Campolato, Arce
- Roccaguglielma, Esperia
- Castello di Fumone, Fumone
- Castello Boncompagni – Viscogliosi, Isola del Liri
- Castello di Monte San Giovanni Campano, Monte San Giovanni Campano
- Castello di Vicalvi, Vicalvi

Province of Latina

- Baronal Castle, Fondi
- Angevin-Aragonese Castle, Gaeta
- Fortress of Sant'Andrea, Itri
- Caetani Castle, Sermoneta

Province of Rieti

- Castello Nobili Vitelleschi, Labro
- Castello Sederini, Collalto Sabino
- Castello Cesarini, Rocca Sinibalda
- Castello Sforza Cesarini, Frasso Sabino
- Castello Orsini, Montenero Sabino
- Castel San Pietro Sabino, frazione of Poggio Mirteto
- Castello di Piscignola, Antrodoco
- Bocchignano, frazione of Montopoli di Sabina
- Castel Sant'Angelo

Province of Rome

- Castello di Torre in Pietra, Torre in Pietra
- Castello Massimo, Arsoli
- Castello Orsini-Odescalchi, Bracciano
- Castello Ducale Orsini, Fiano Romano
- Borgo Castello di Castiglione, Palombara Sabina
- Castello Savelli Torlonia, Palombara Sabina
- Castellaccio dei Monteroni, Ladispoli
- Castello di Palo, Ladispoli
- Castrum Marcellini, Marcellina
- Castel Nomentum, Mentana
- Castello degli Orsini, Morlupo
- Castello Orsini, Nerola
- Castle of Julius II, Ostia Antica
- Casal de' Pazzi, Rome
- Castello di Lunghezza, Rome
- Castello della Magliana, Rome
- Castel Sant'Angelo, Rome
- Castello Theodoli, Sambuci
- Castello Orsini-Cesi-Borghese, San Polo dei Cavalieri
- Rocca Abbaziale, Subiaco
- Rocca Pia, Tivoli
- Castello di Rota, Tolfa

Province of Viterbo

- Rocca, Civita Castellana
- Castello di Latera, Latera
- Castello Borgia, Nepi
- Castello Orsini, Soriano nel Cimino
- Castello Ruspoli, Vignanello
- Castello Proceno, Proceno
- Torre Alfina, Torre Alfina

== Liguria ==
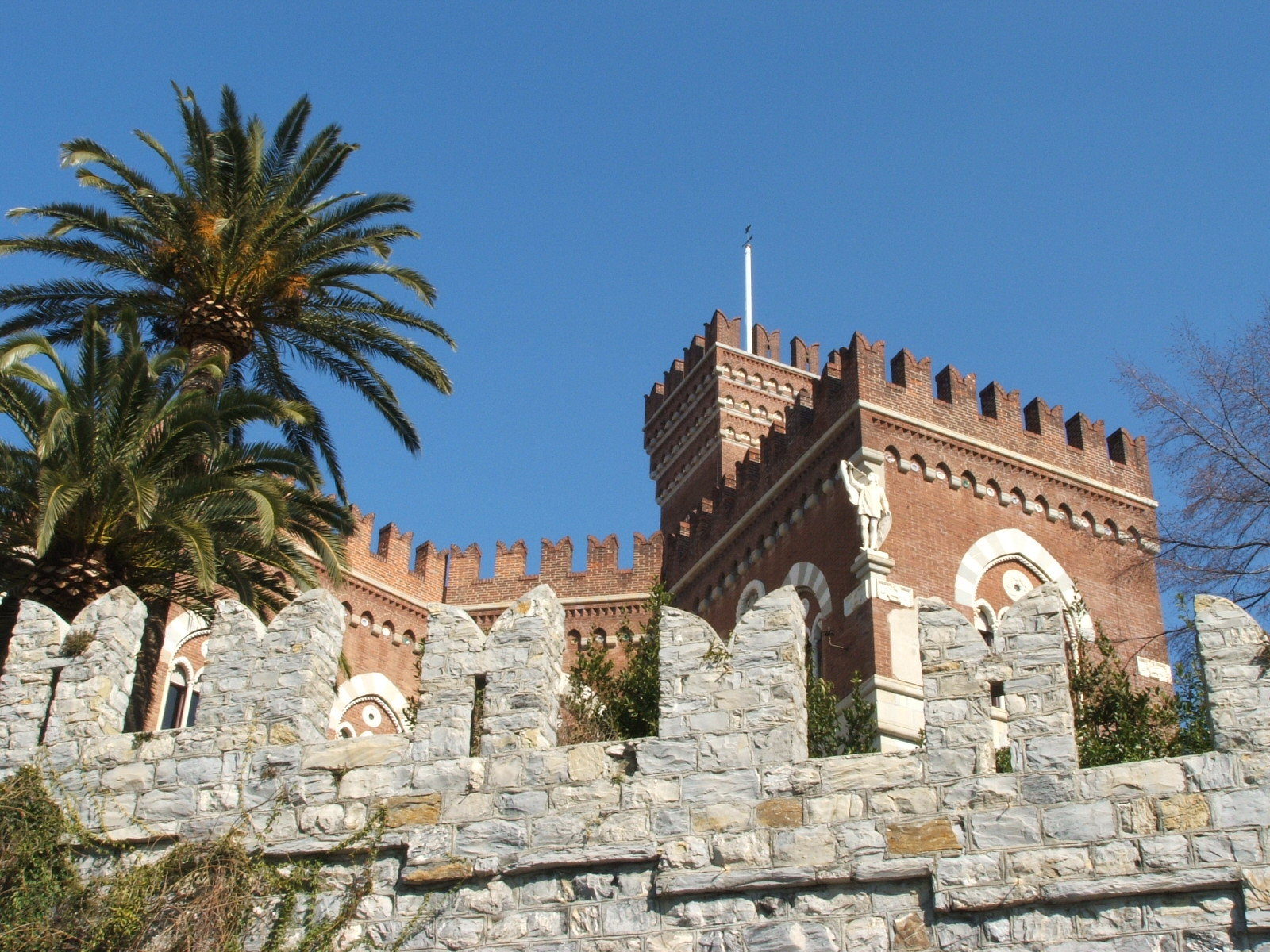
Albertis Castle, Genoa

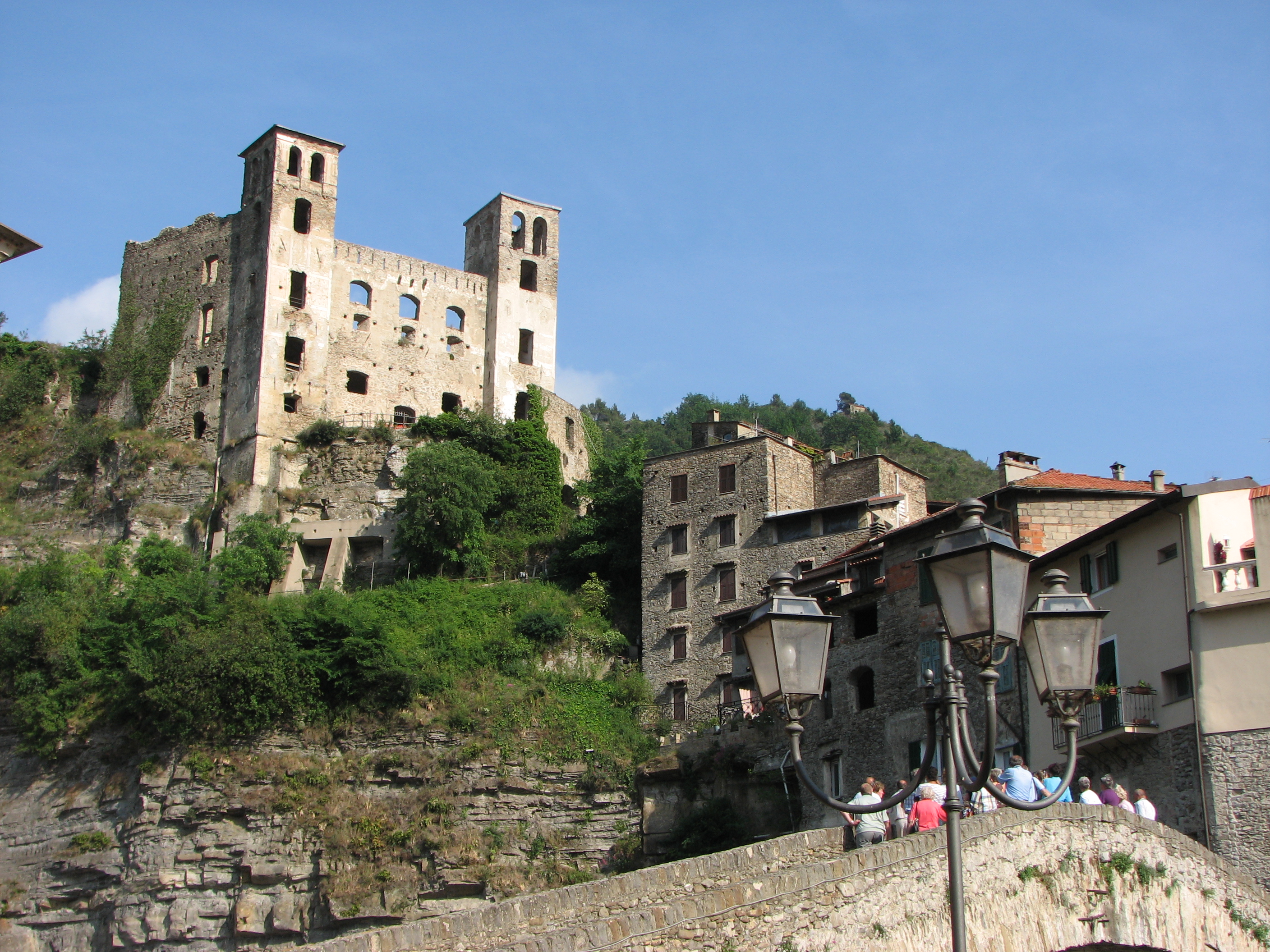
Castello di Dolceacqua, Dolceacqua

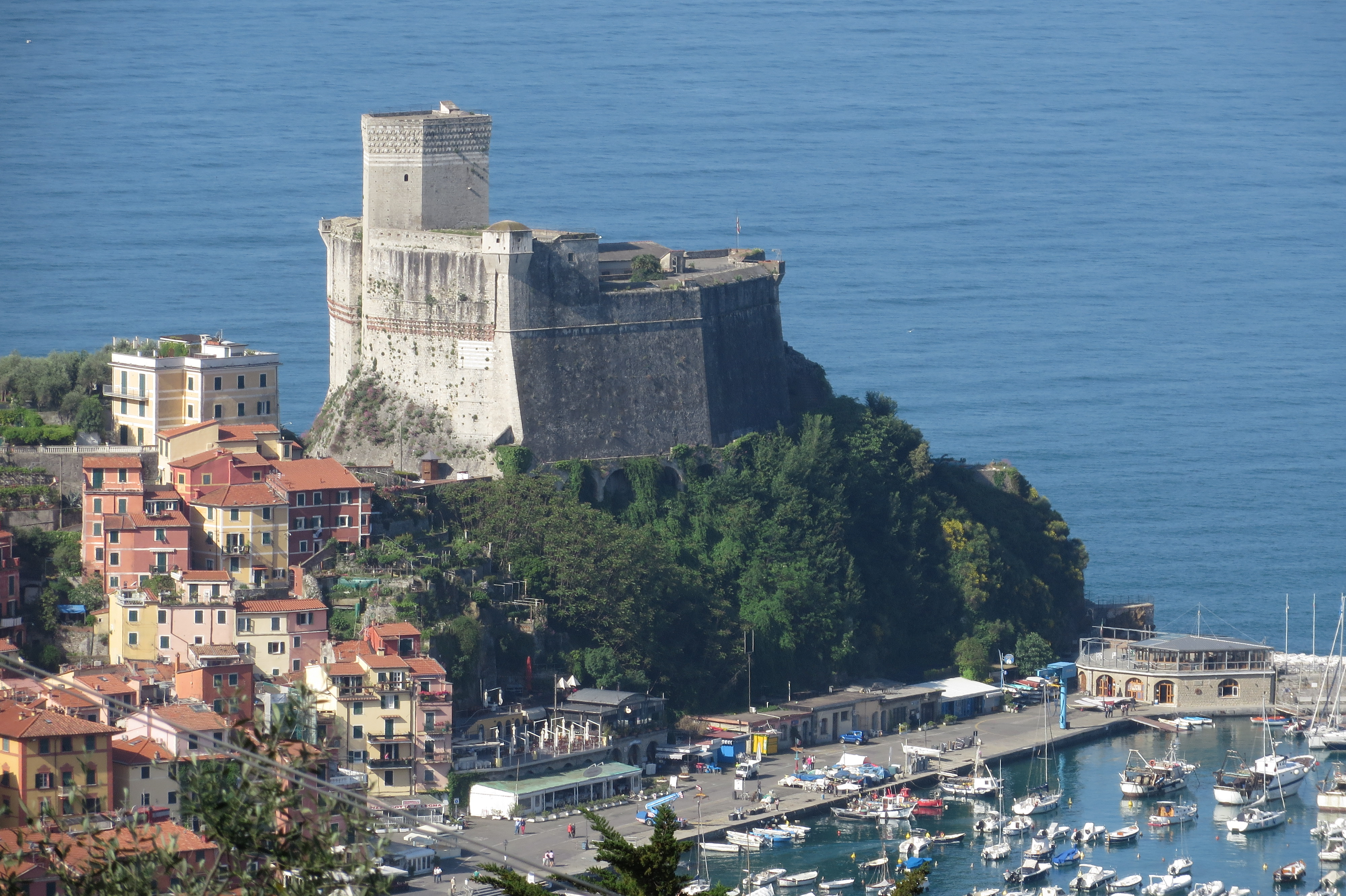
Castello di Lerici, Lerici

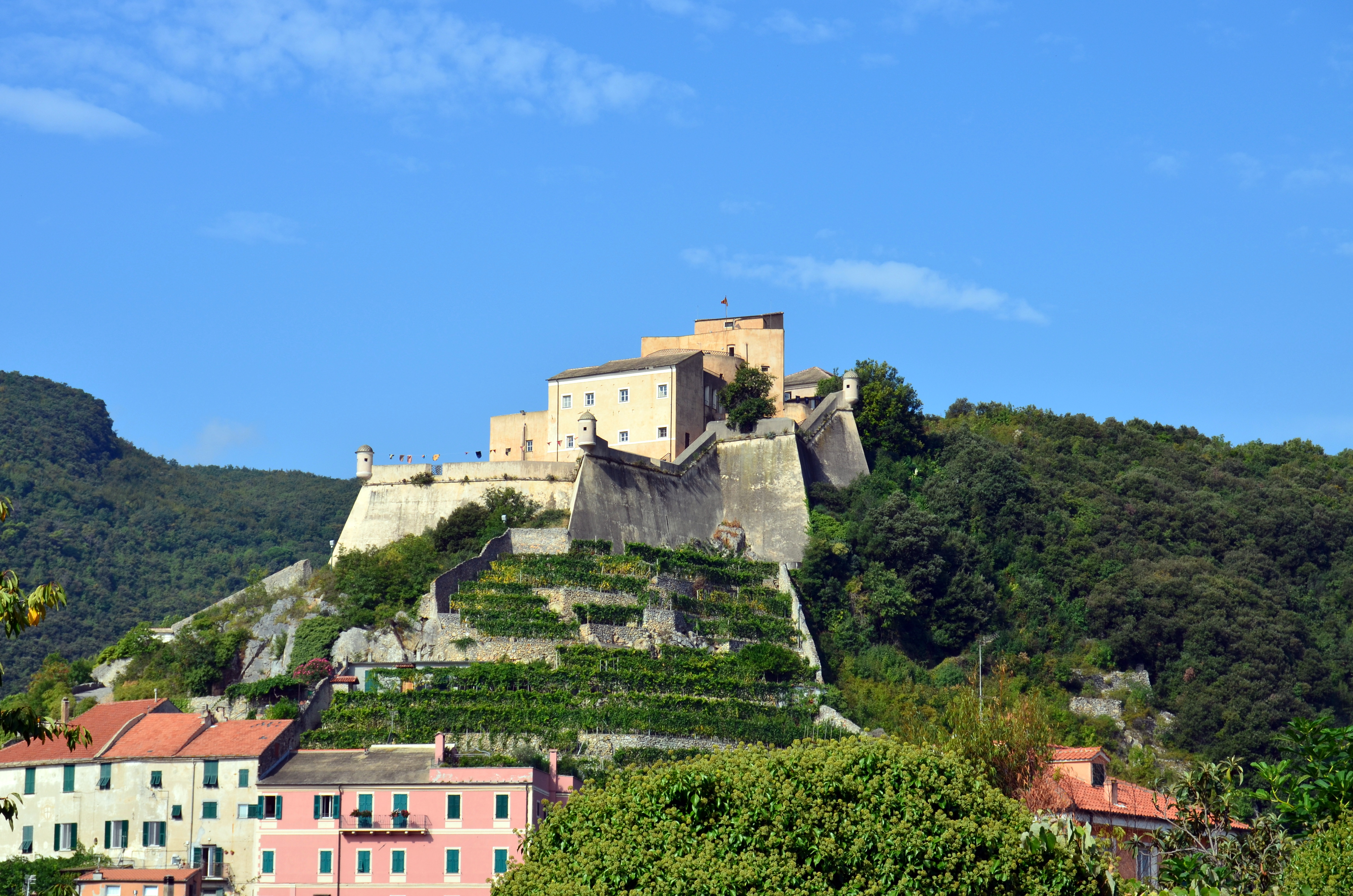
Castel San Giovanni, Finale Ligure

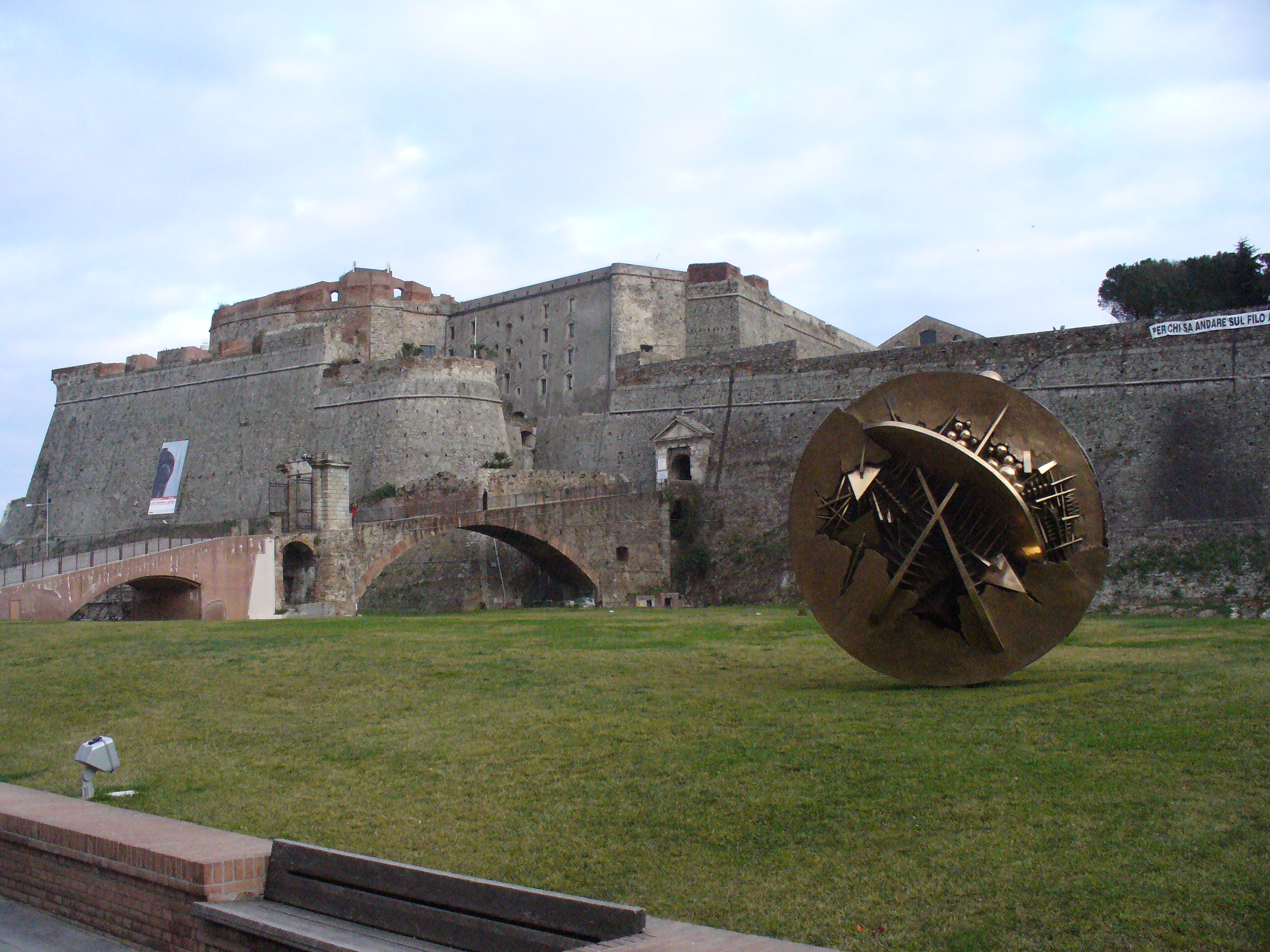
Priamar Fortress, Savona

Province of Genoa

- Castello di Busalla, Busalla
- Castello della Dragonara, Camogli
- Castello di Campo Ligure, Campo Ligure
- Chiavari Castle, Chiavari
- Albertis Castle, Genoa
- Castello Mackenzie, Genoa
- Castello Raggio, Genoa
- Castello di Isola del Cantone, Isola del Cantone
- Castello Spinola-Mignacco, Isola del Cantone
- Castello di Montoggio, Montoggio
- Castello Brown, Portofino
- Castello di Rapallo, Rapallo
- Castello di Borgo Fornari, Ronco Scrivia
- Castello di Ronco Scrivia, Ronco Scrivia
- Castello di Santa Margherita Ligure, Santa Margherita Ligure
- Castello di Santo Stefano d'Aveto, Santo Stefano d'Aveto
- Castello di Savignone, Savignone
- Castello della Pietra, Vobbia

Province of Imperia

- Castello della Lucertola, Apricale
- Castello di Dolceacqua, Dolceacqua
- Castello d'Appio, Ventimiglia

Province of La Spezia

- Castello di San Giorgio, La Spezia
- Castello di Lerici, Lerici
- Castello di Porto Venere, Porto Venere
- Fortezza di Sarzanello, Sarzana
- Castello Montetanano, Varese Ligure

Province of Savona

- Il Castellaro, Albisola Superiore
- Castello di Andora, Andora
- Castello di Bardineto, Bardineto
- Castello di Cairo Montenotte, Cairo Montenotte
- Castelfranco, Finale Ligure
- Castel Gavone, Finale Ligure
- Castelletto, Finale Ligure
- Castel San Giovanni, Finale Ligure
- Castello di Millesimo, Millesimo
- Castello di Monte Ursino, Noli
- Castel Delfino, Pontinvrea
- Priamar, Savona
- Castello di Spotorno, Spotorno
- Castello di Stella, Stella

== Lombardy ==
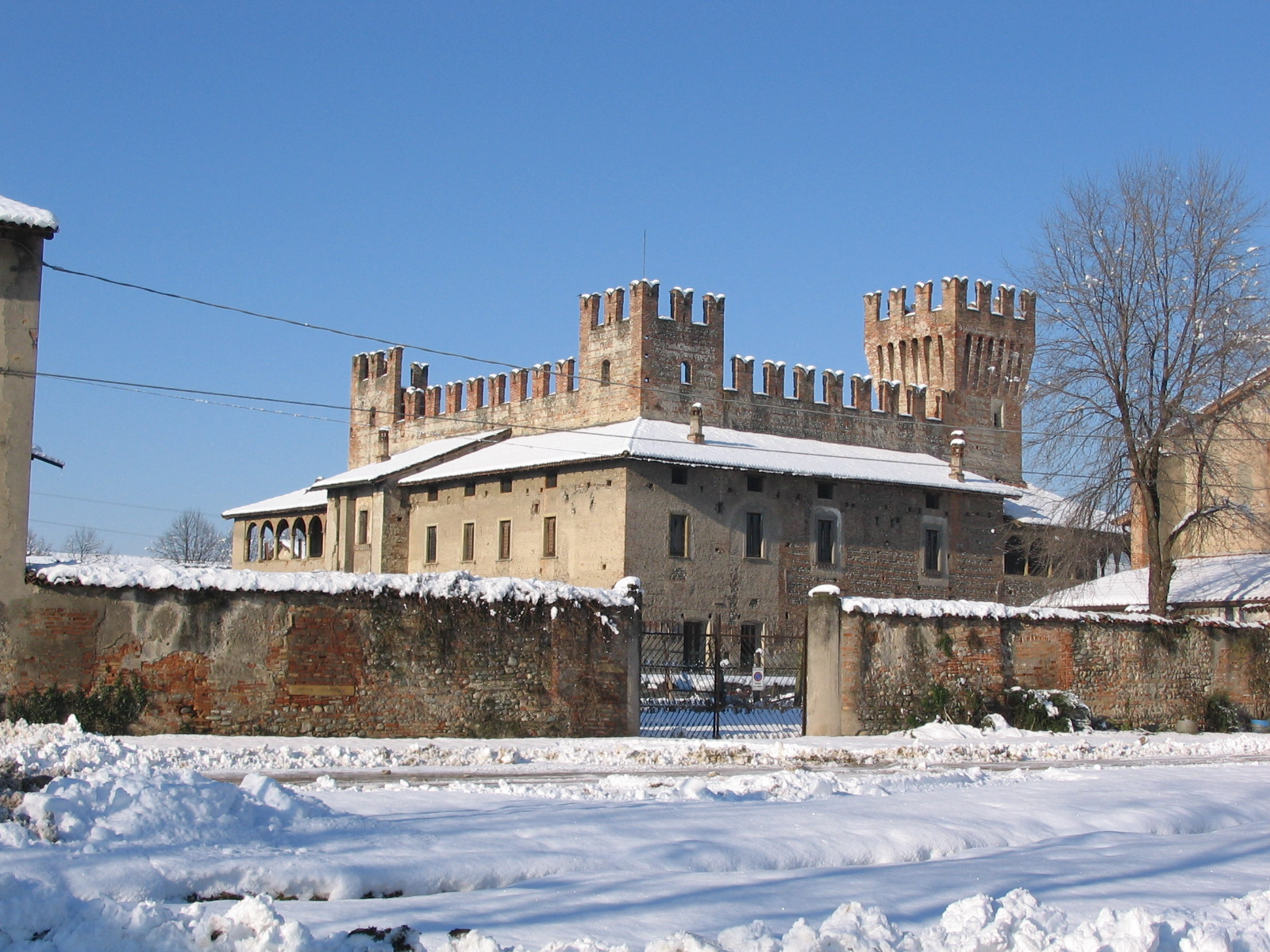
Malpaga Castle

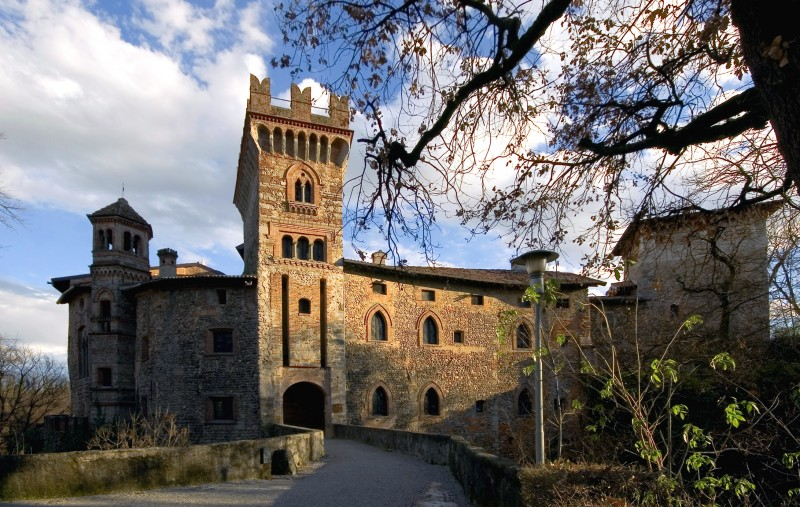
Marne Castle

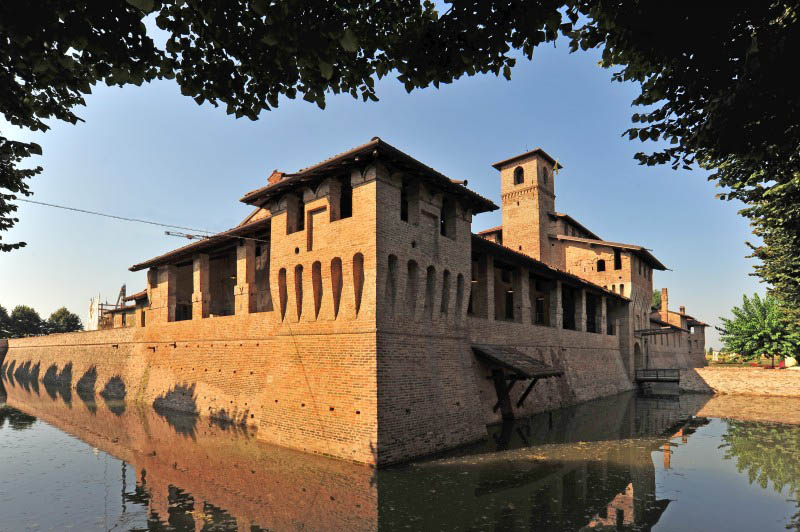
Pagazzano Castle

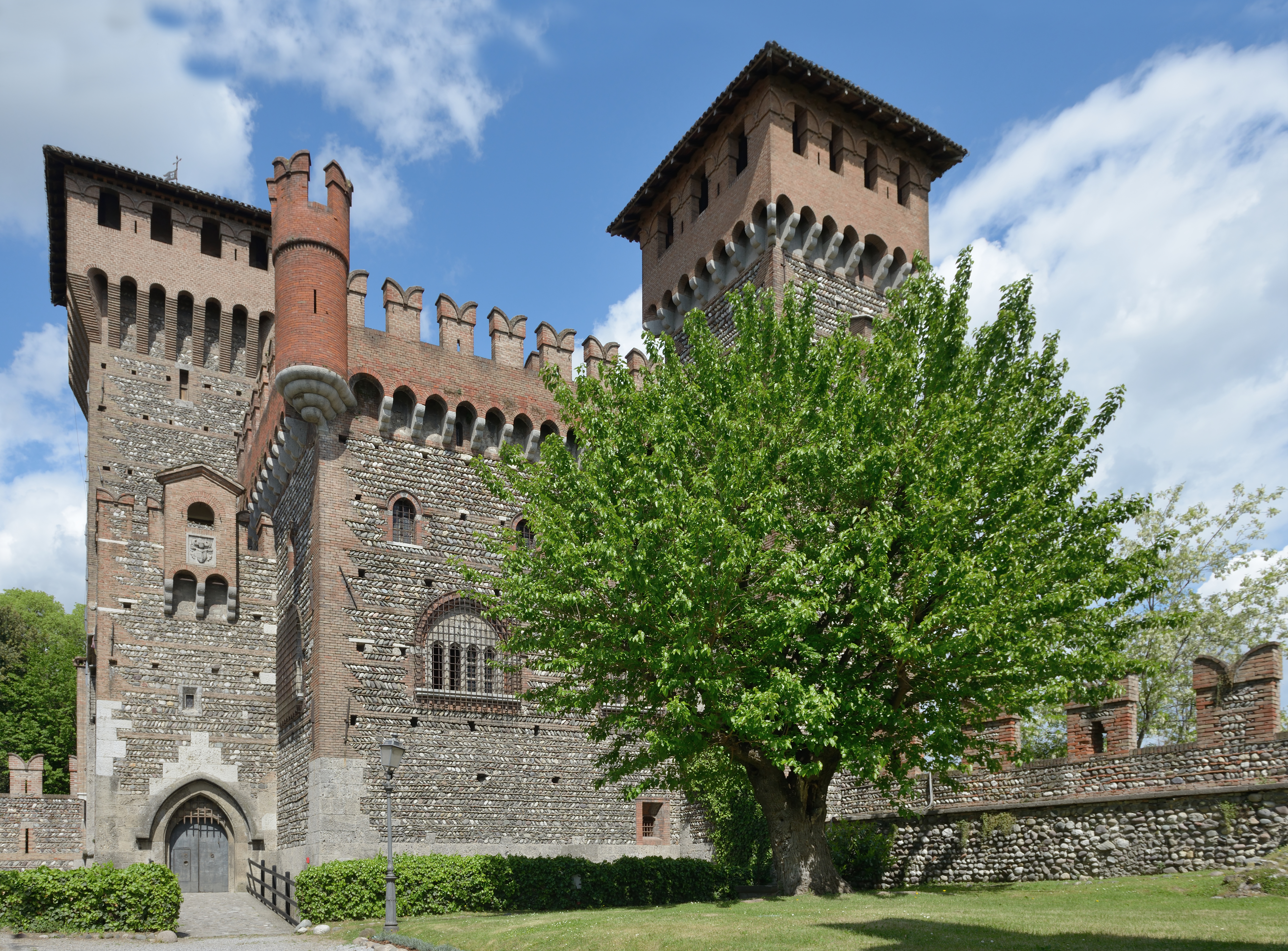
Bonoris Castle, Montichiari

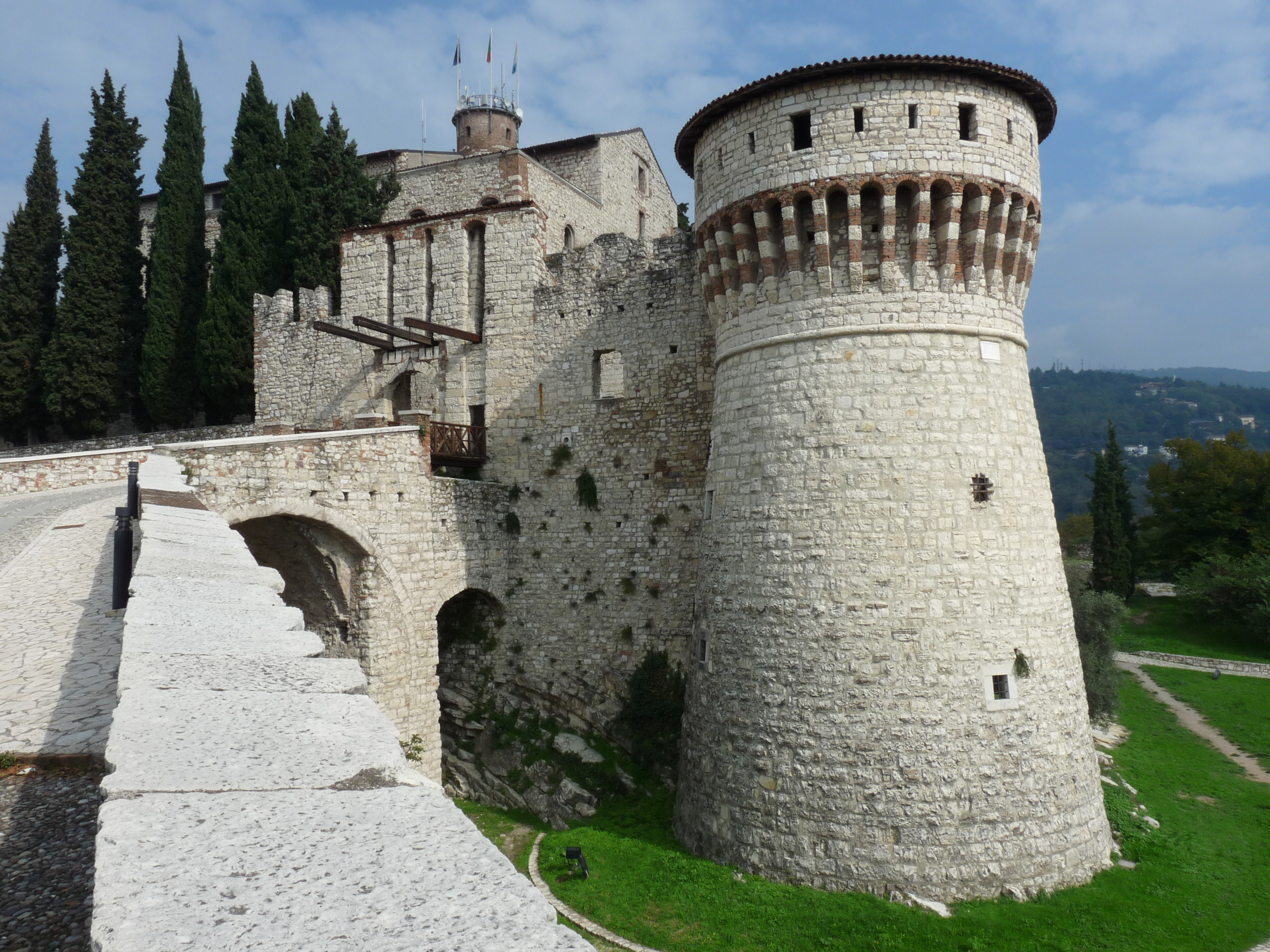
Brescia Castle, Brescia

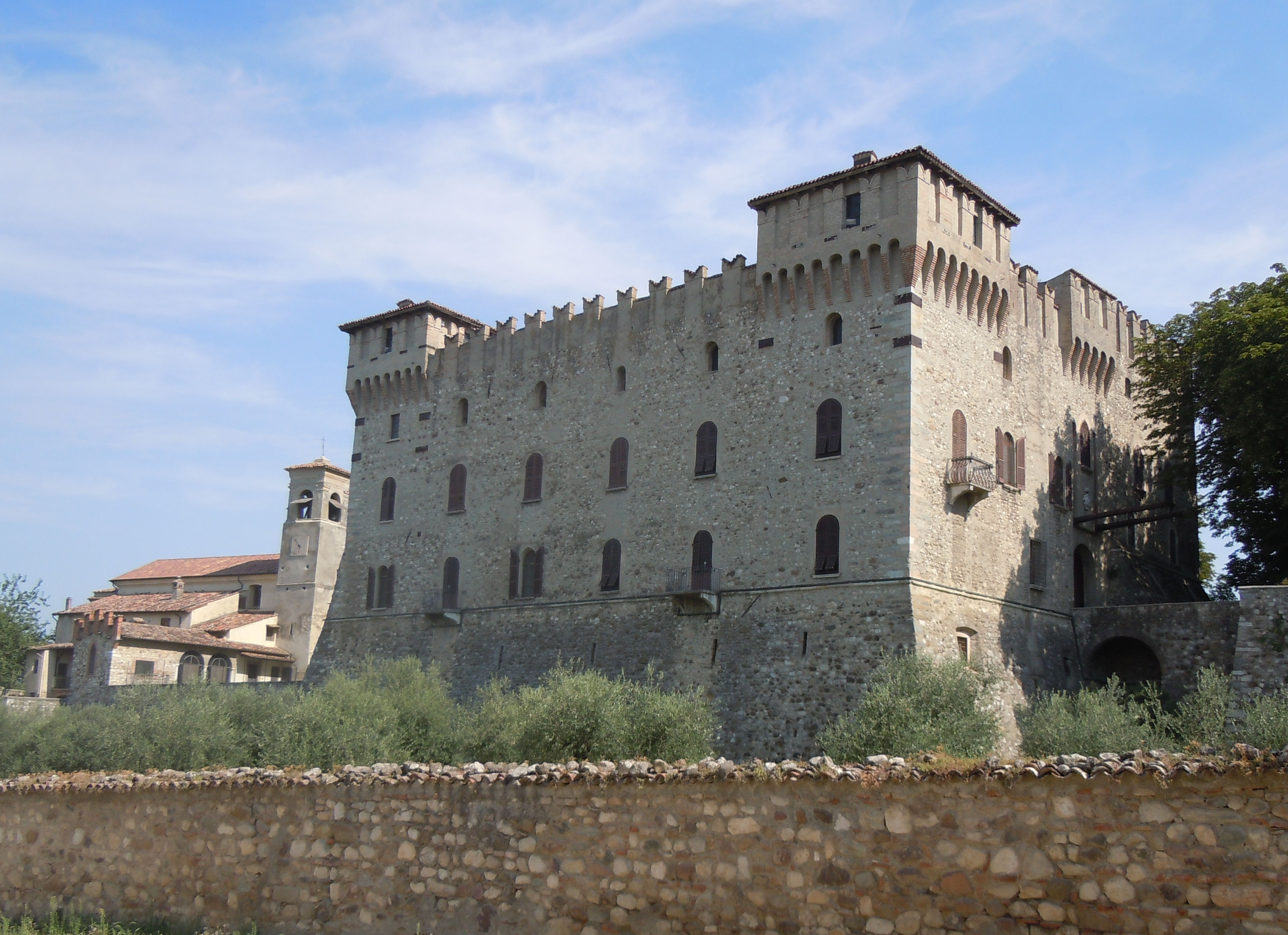
Drugolo Castle, Lonato del Garda

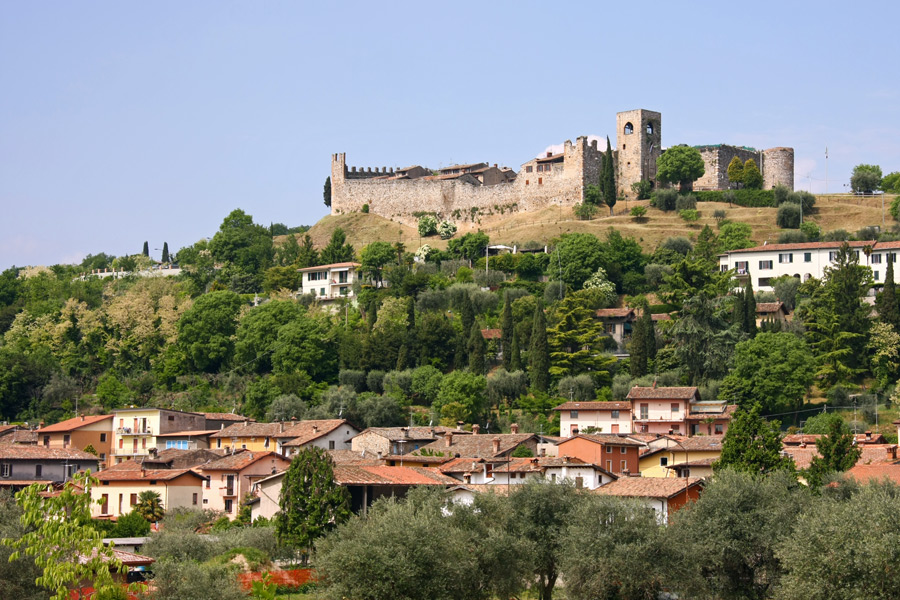
Padenghe Castle, Padenghe sul Garda

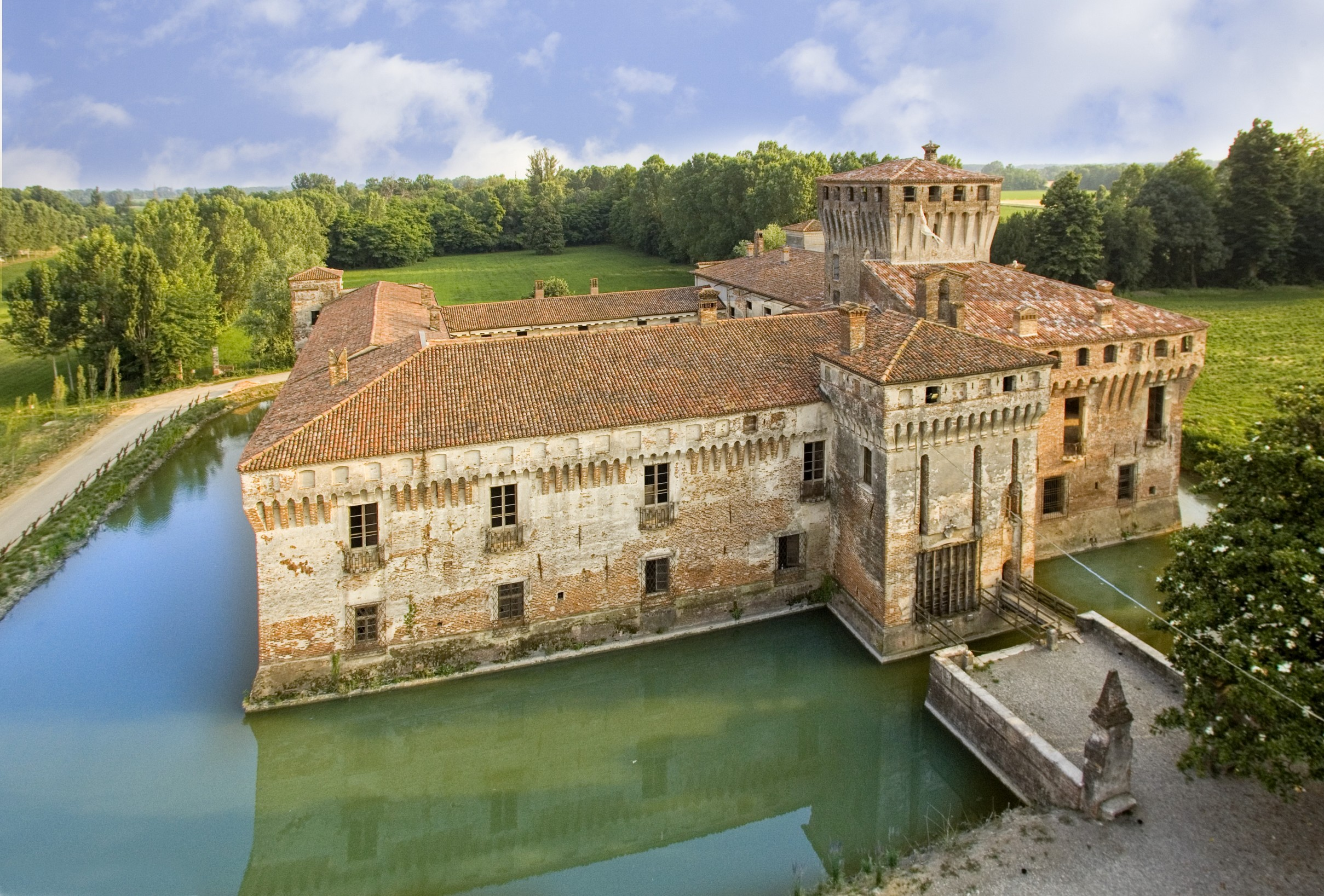
Padernello Castle

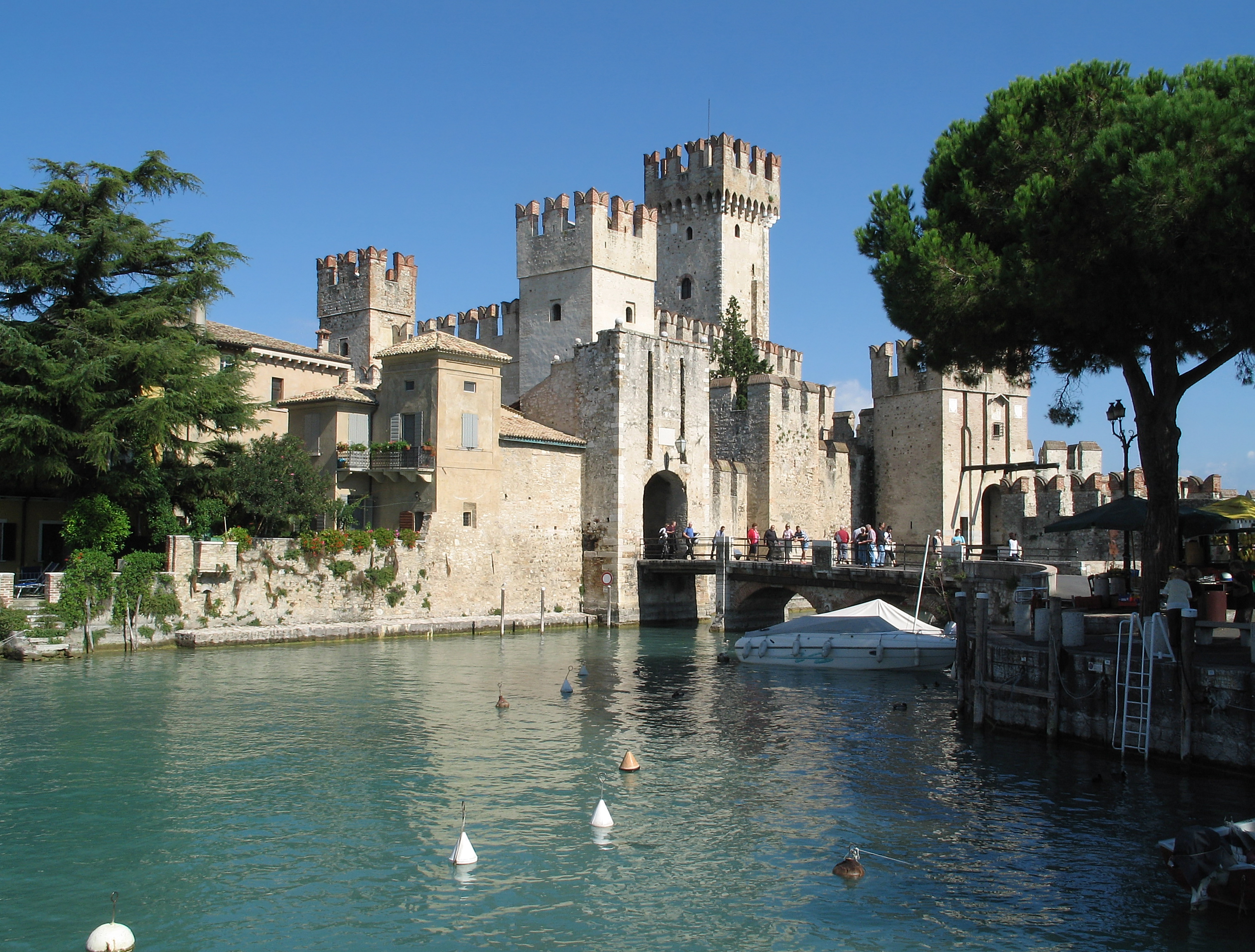
Scaligero Castle, Sirmione

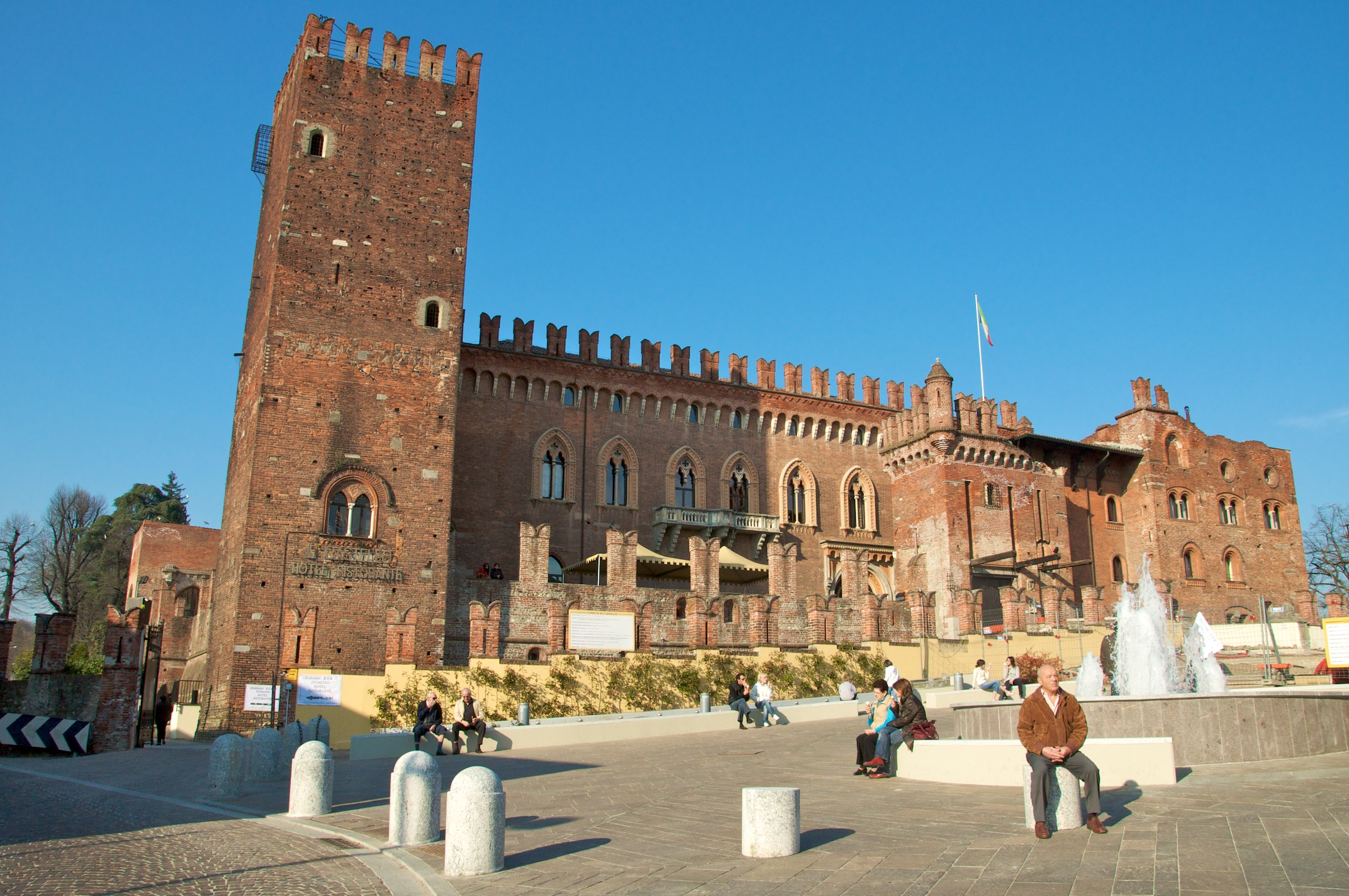
Castello di Carimate, Carimate

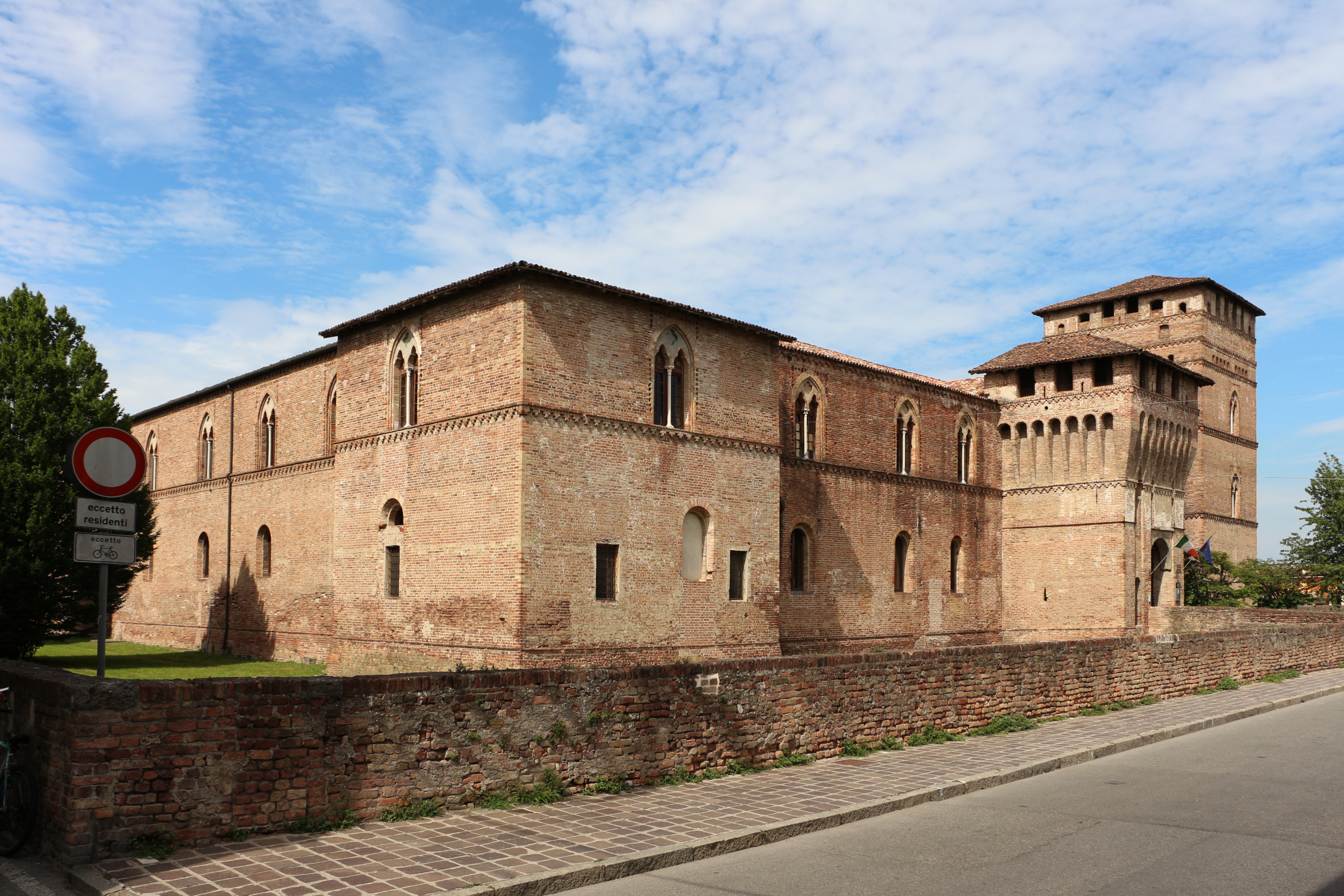
Pandino Castle, Pandino

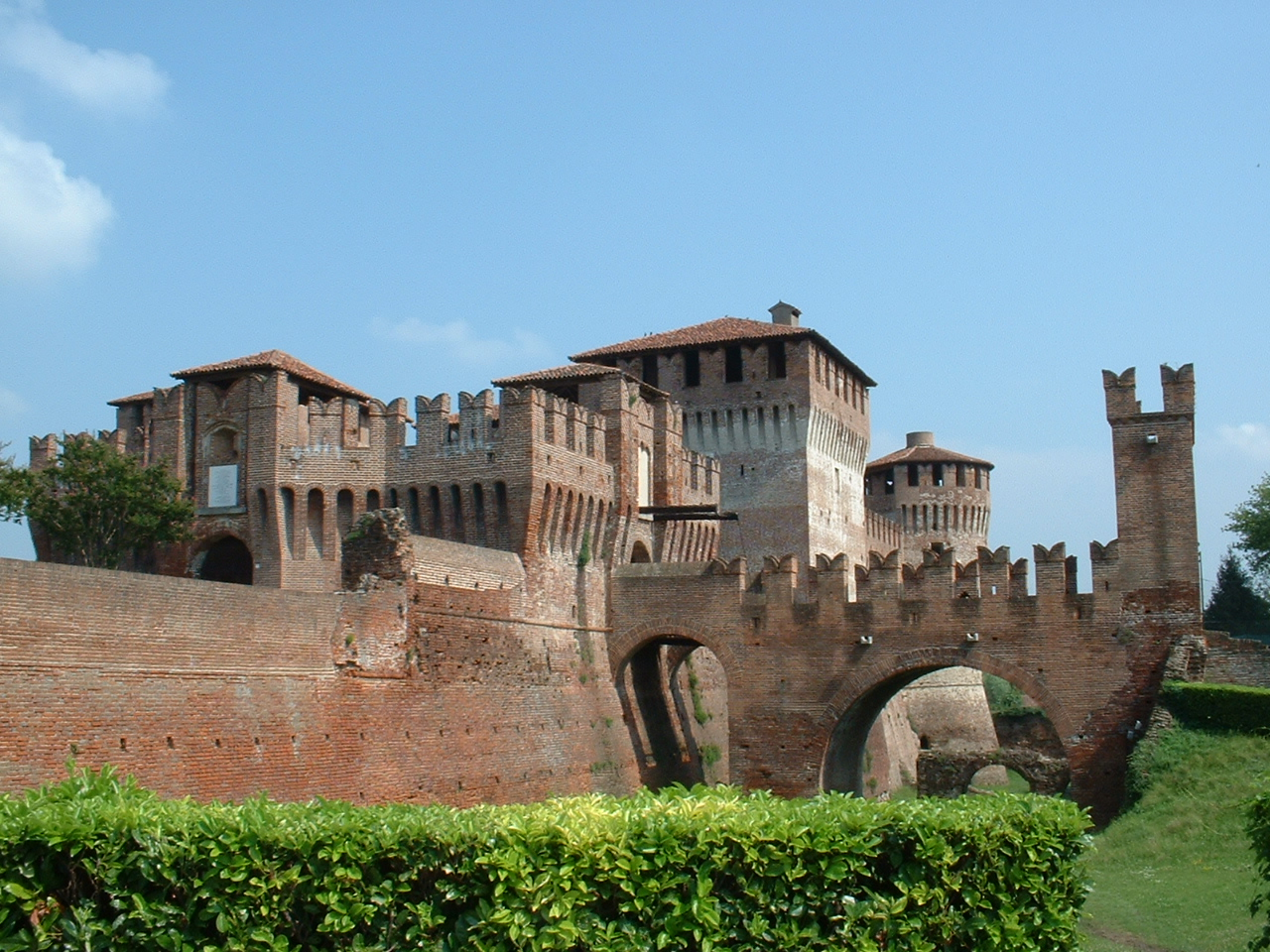
Soncino Castle, Soncino

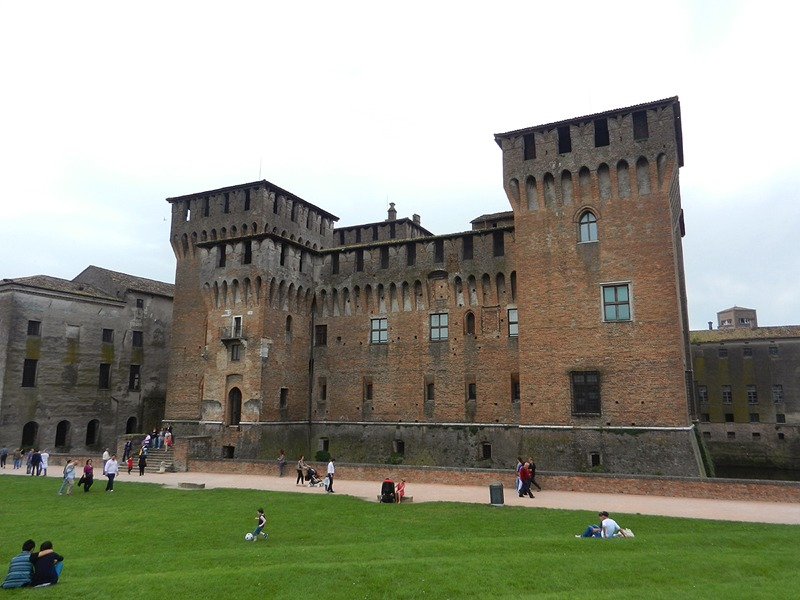
Castello San Giorgio, Mantua

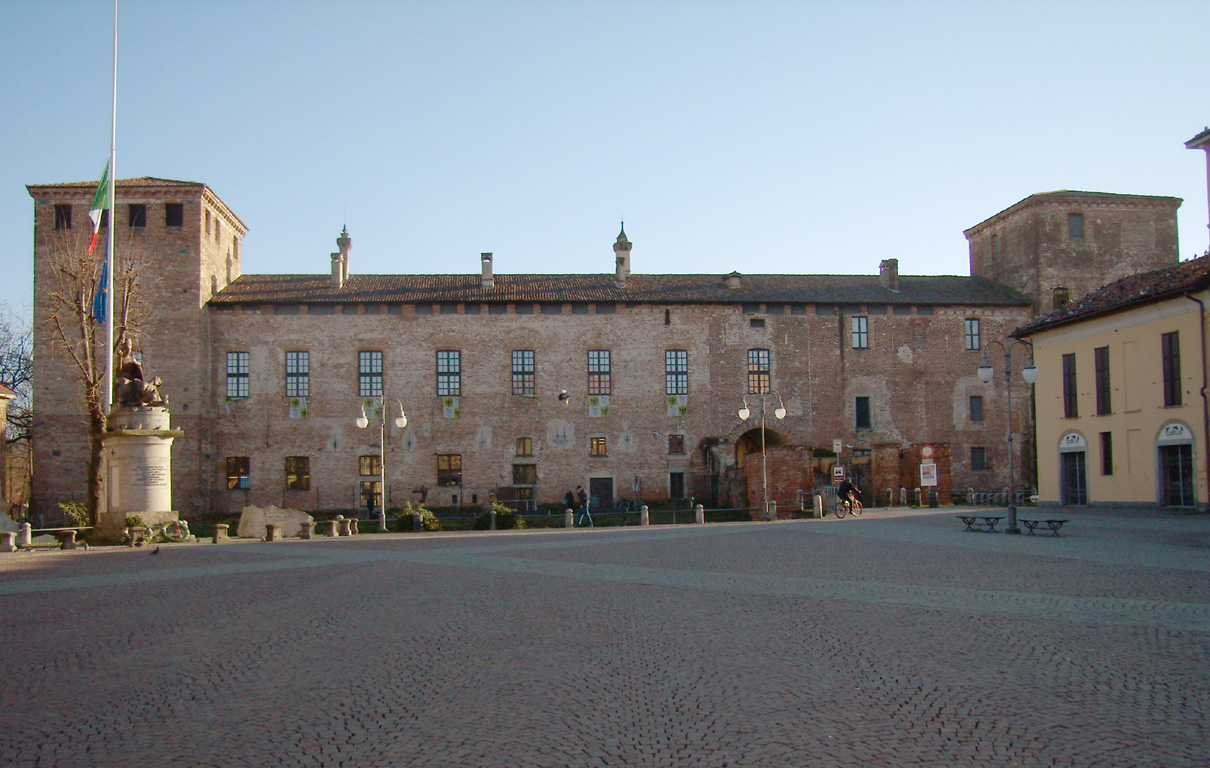
Melegnano Castle, Melegnano

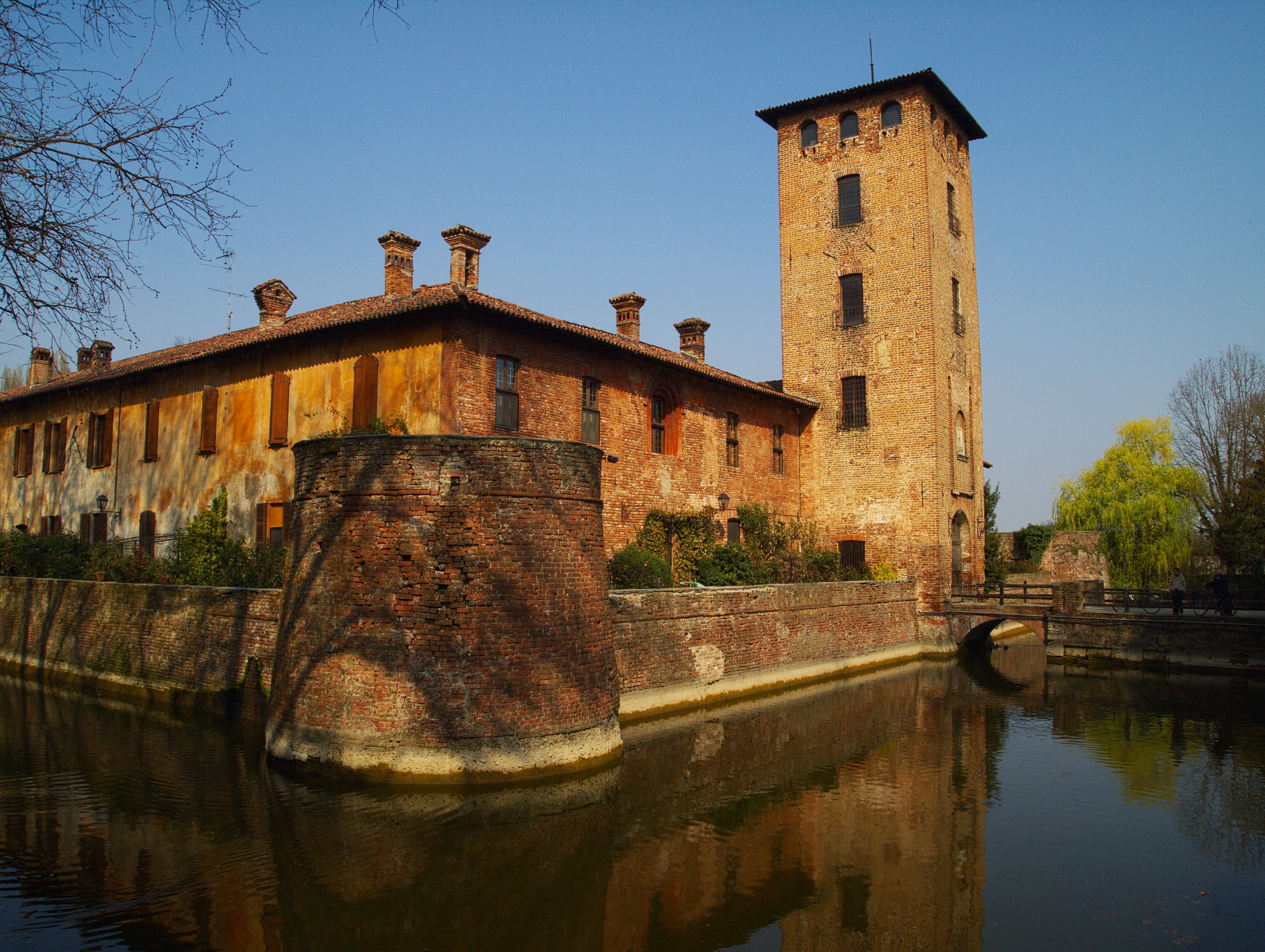
Peschiera Castle, Peschiera Borromeo

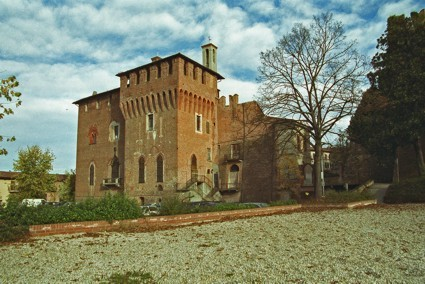
San Colombano Castle, San Colombano al Lambro

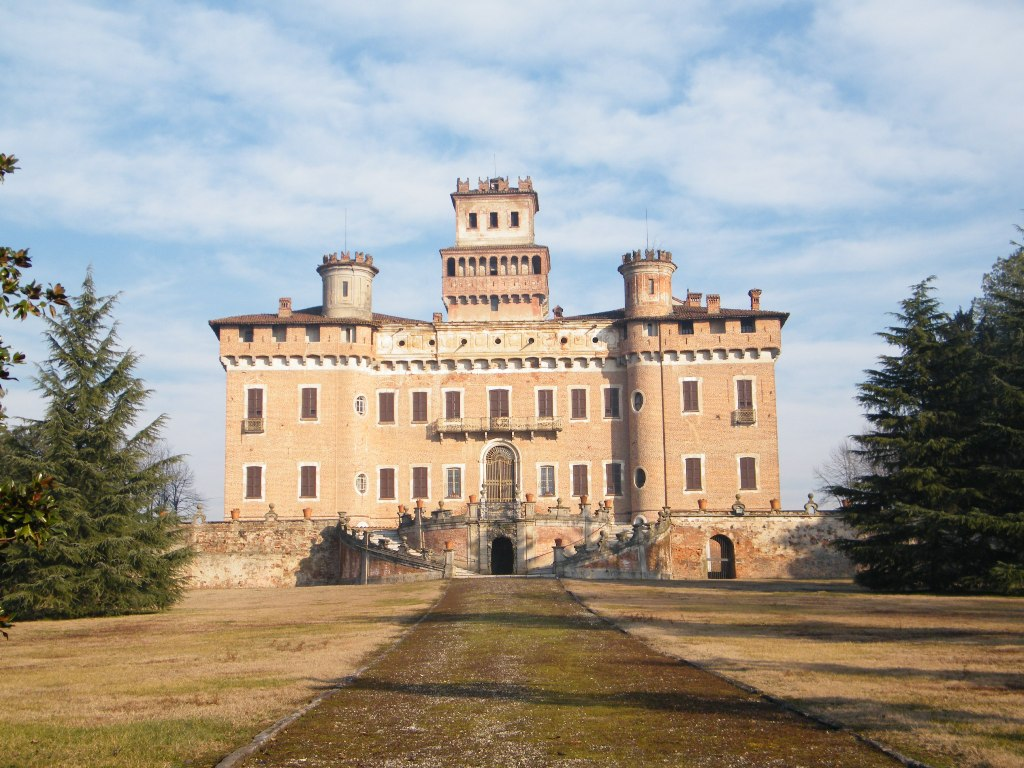
Chignolo Po Castle, Chignolo Po

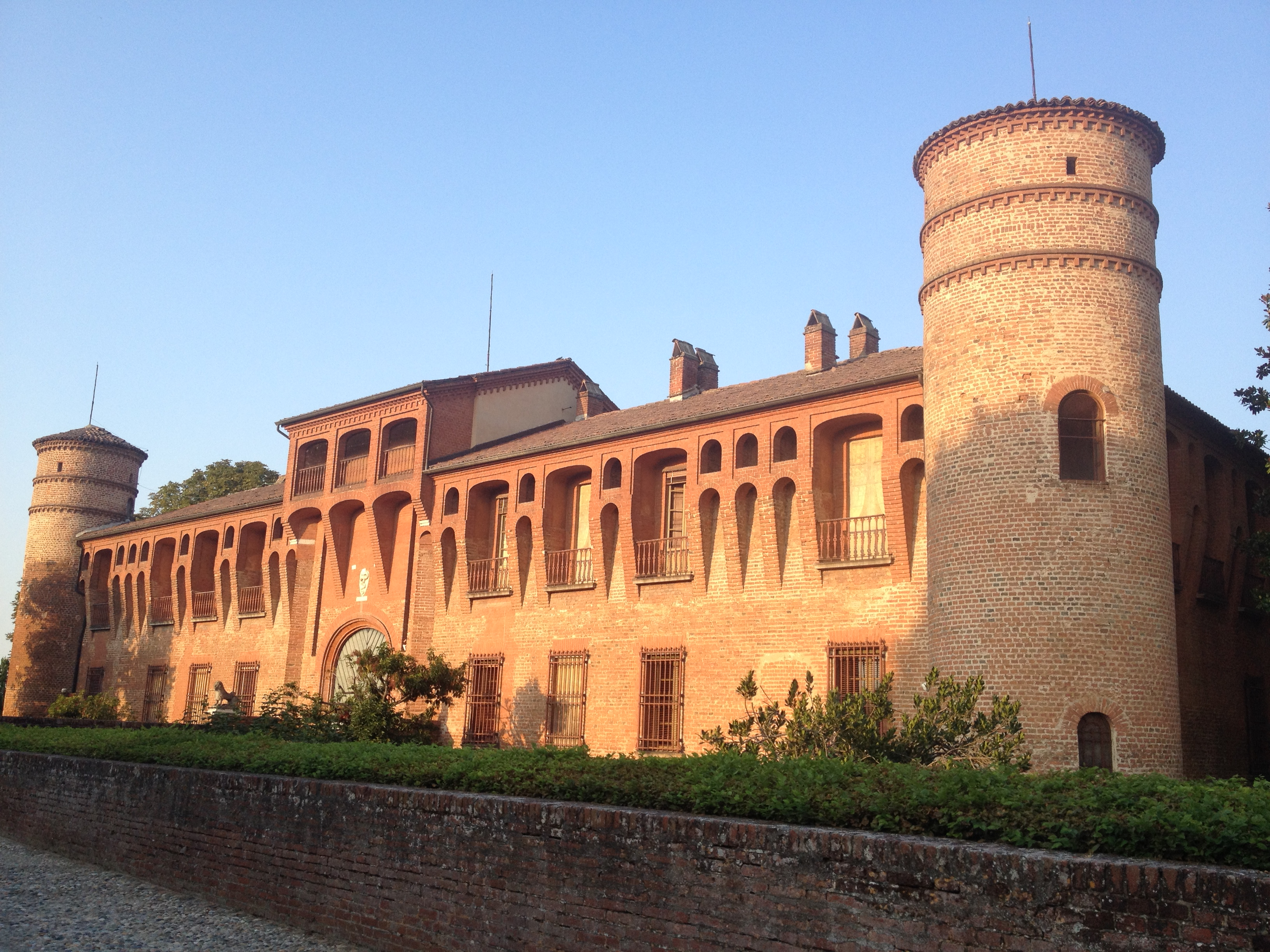
Frascarolo Castle, Frascarolo

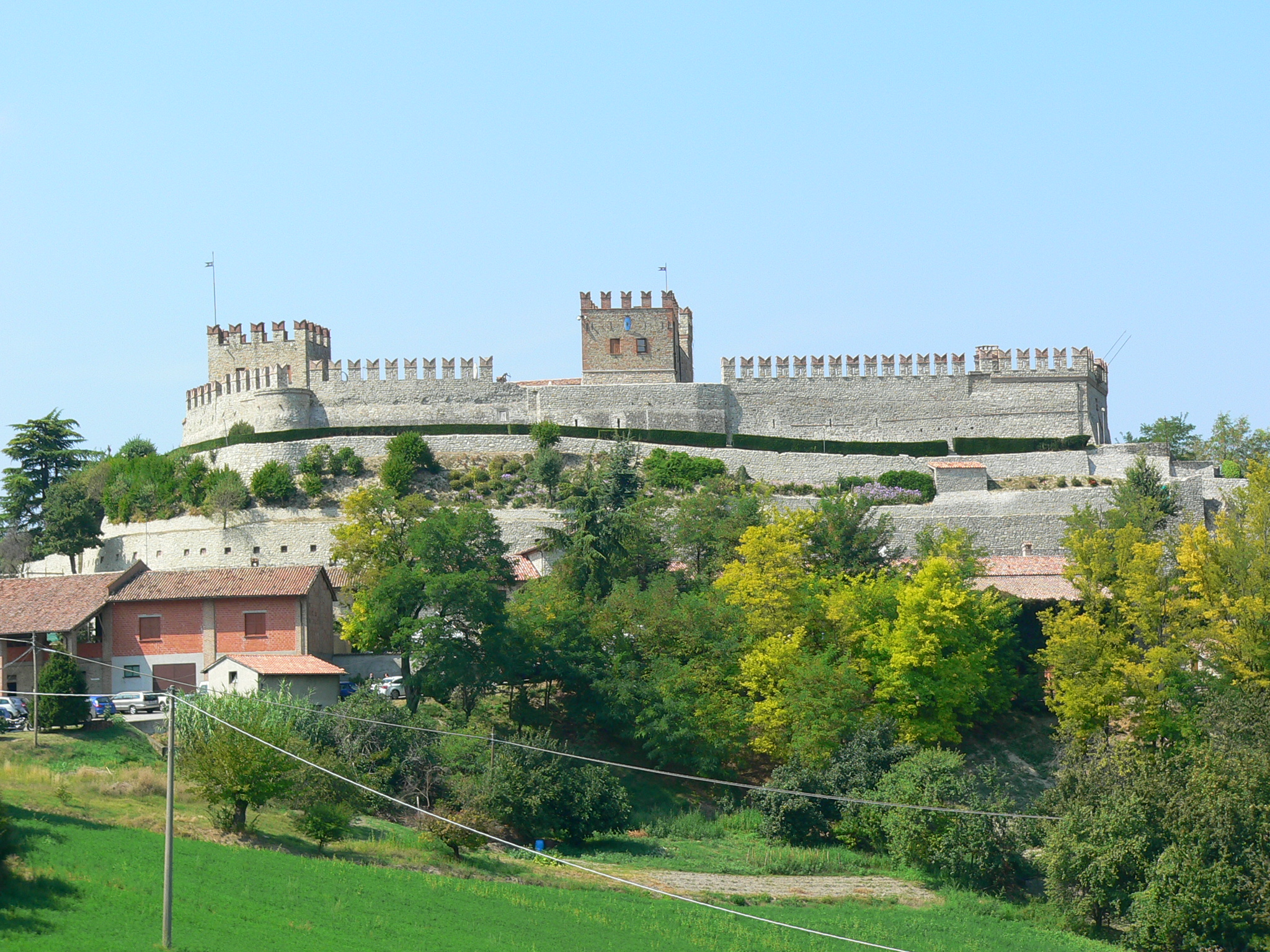
Montesegale Castle, Montesegale

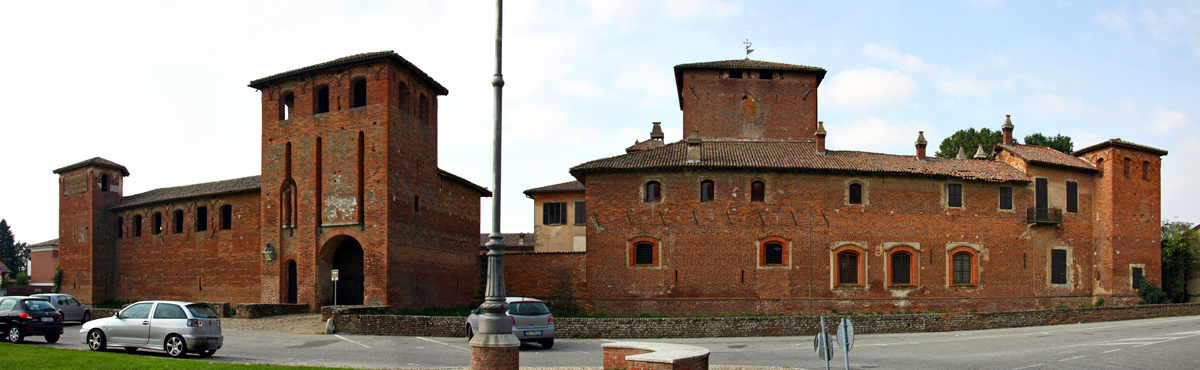
Scaldasole Castle, Scaldasole

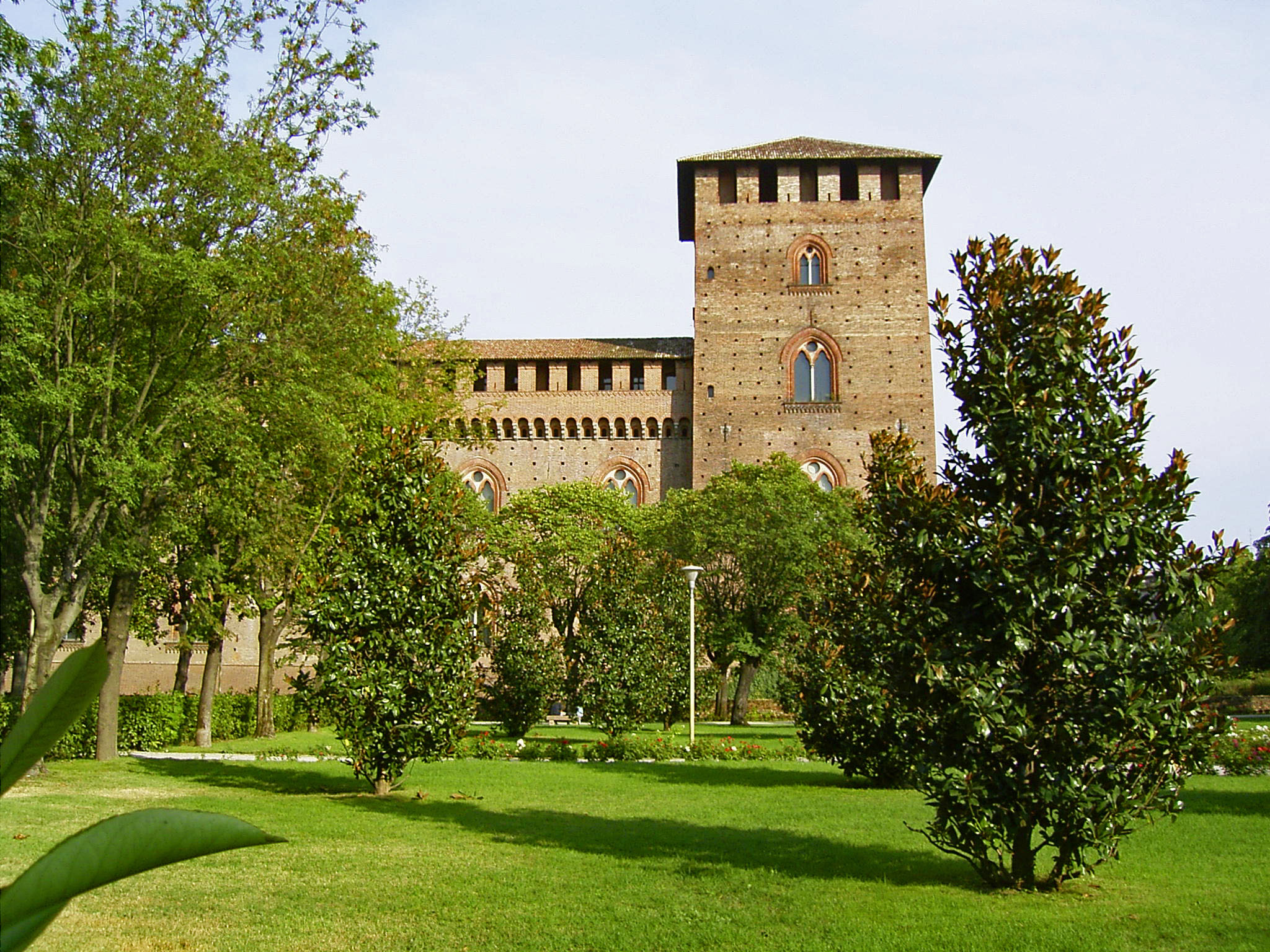
Visconti Castle, Pavia

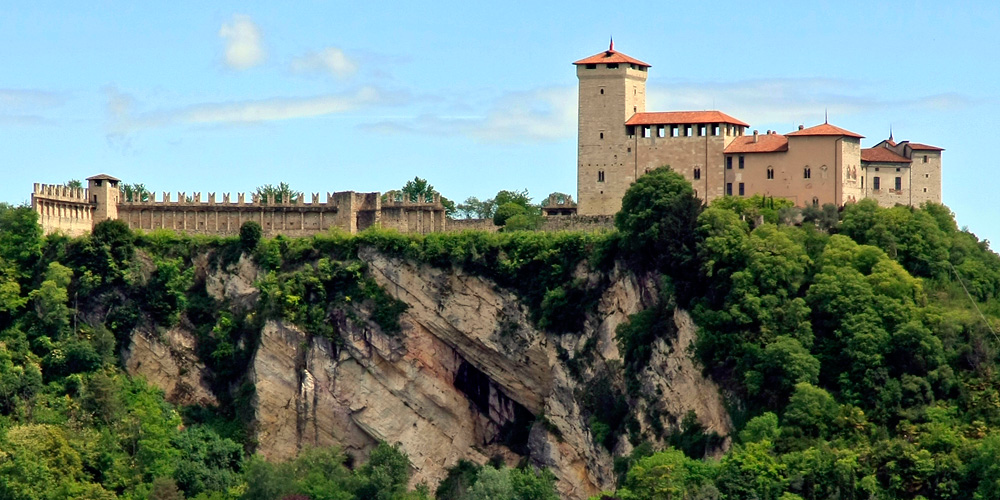
Rocca Borromeo di Angera, Angera

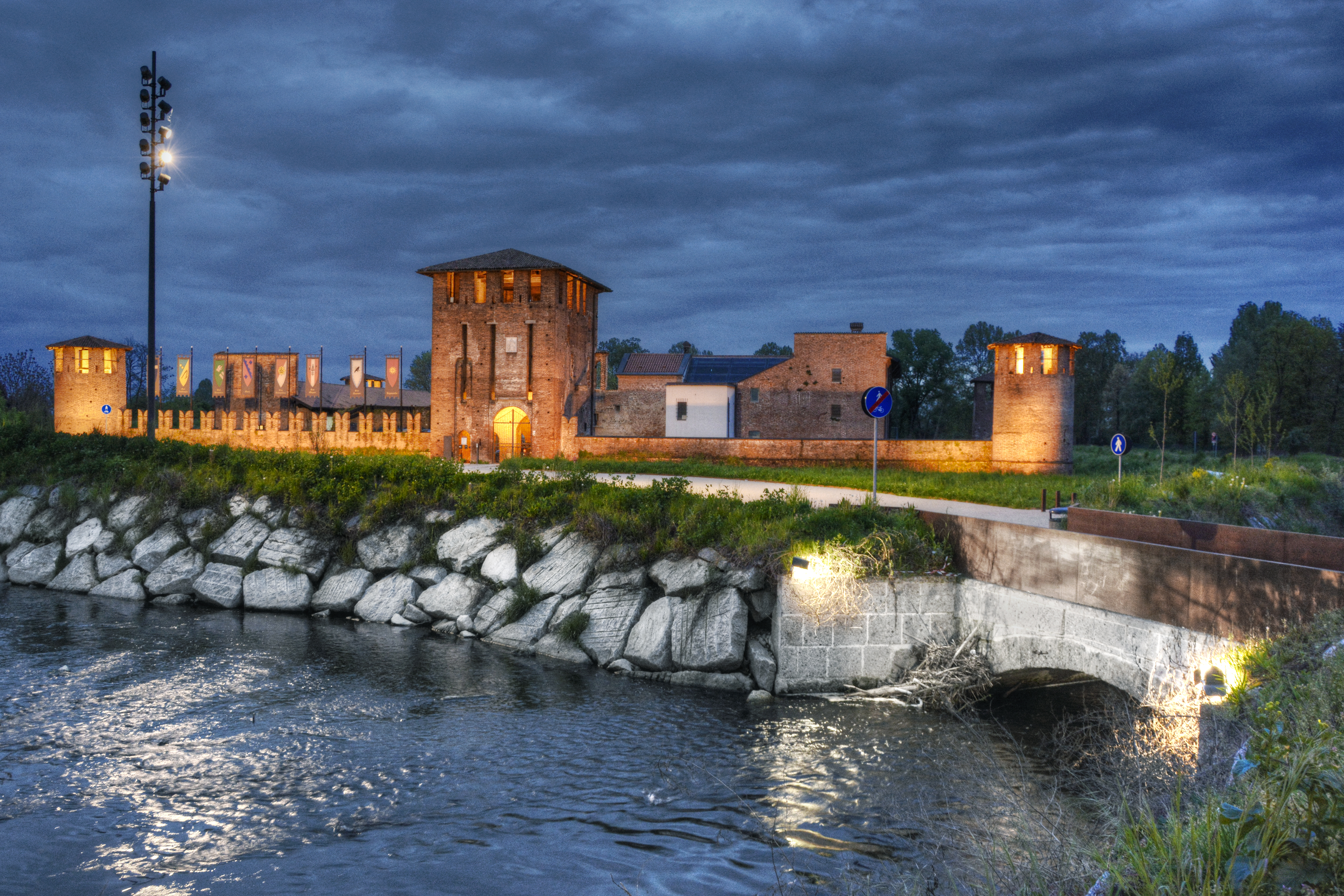
Visconti Castle, Legnano

Province of Bergamo

- Barbò Castle, Pumenengo
- Calepio Castle, Castelli Calepio
- Bianzano Castle, Bianzano
- Camozzi Vertova Castle, Costa di Mezzate.
- Cavernago Castle, Cavernago
- Malpaga Castle, Cavernago
- Marne Castle, Filago
- Pagazzano Castle, Pagazzano
- Pumenengo Castle, Pumenengo
- Romano Castle, Romano di Lombardia
- San Vigilio Castle, Bergamo
- Urgnano Castle, Urgnano.

Province of Brescia

- Bonoris Castle, Montichiari
- Brescia Castle, Brescia
- Drugolo Castle, Lonato del Garda
- Padenghe Castle, Padenghe sul Garda
- Padernello Castle, Padernello.
- Palazzolo Castle, Palazzolo sull'Oglio
- Scaligero, Sirmione

Province of Como

- Castello Baradello, Como
- Castello di Carimate, Carimate
- Pandino Castle, Pandino
- Soncino Castle, Soncino

Province of Lecco

- Castello Andriani, Dervio

Province of Lodi

- Maccastorna Castle, Maccastorna
- Sant'Angelo Lodigiano Castle, Sant'Angelo Lodigiano
- Trecchi Castle, Maleo

Province of Mantua

Castles

- Asola Castle, Asola. Now ruined.
- Castel d'Ario Castle, Castel d'Ario.
- Castel Goffredo Castle, Castel Goffredo.
- Castello San Giorgio, Mantua. Built in the 14th century by the Gonzaga family.
- Castiglione delle Stiviere Castle, Castiglione delle Stiviere.
- Cavriana Castle, Cavriana.
- Mariana Mantovana Castle, Mariana Mantovana.
- Redondesco Castle, Redondesco.
- Villimpenta Castle, Villimpenta.
- Volta Mantovana Castle, Volta Mantovana. Now ruined.

Towers

- Castel Goffredo Civic Tower Castle, Castel Goffredo.
- Castellucchio Civic Tower, Castellucchio.
- Piubega Tower, Piubega.
- Torre dell'Orologio, Mantua.

Province of Milan

Castles

- Abbiategrasso Castle, Abbiategrasso. Built in the 14th century by the Visconti family.
- Badile Castle. Built in the 15th century.
- Binasco Castle, Binasco. Built in the 13th–14th century by the Visconti family.
- Buccinasco Castle, Buccinasco. Built in the 14th century by the Visconti family.
- Carpiano Castle, Carpiano. Built in the 14th century by the Visconti family.
- Cassano Castle, Cassano d'Adda. Built in the 13th century by the Visconti family.
- Cassino Scanasio Castle, Cassino Scanasio. Built in the 14th century by the Visconti family.
- Castellazzo Castle.
- Coazzano Castle, Coazzano. Built in the 14th century by the Visconti family.
- Corneliano Castle, Corneliano Bertario. Built in the 14th century by the Borromeo family.
- Cusago Castle, Cusago. Built in the 14th century by the Visconti family.
- Grezzago Castle.
- Lacchiarella Castle, Lacchiarella. Built in the 14th century by the Visconti family but it dates back to the 10th century.
- Longhignana Castle.
- Macconago Castle.
- Mairano Castle. Built in the 15th century.
- Melegnano Castle, Melegnano. Known as Castello Mediceo, it was built in the 13th century by the Visconti family.
- Peschiera Castle, Peschiera Borromeo. Built in the 15th century by the Borromeo family.
- Rosate Castle, Rosate. Built in the 14th century by the Visconti family, now ruined.
- Rozzano Castle, Rozzano. Built in the 15th century.
- San Colombano Castle, San Colombano al Lambro. Built in the 12th century by the Frederick I and renovated in the 14th century by the Visconti family.
- Sforza Castle, Milan. Built in the 14th century by the Visconti and Sforza.
- Tolcinasco Castle, Tolcinasco. Built in the 16th century by the d'Adda family.
- Trezzo Castle, Trezzo sull'Adda. Built in the 14th century by the Visconti family.
- Turbigo Castle, Turbigo. Dated back to the 9th century.
- Visconti Castle, Legnano. Built in the 13th century by the Della Torre family.
- Zivido Castle, San Giuliano Milanese. Built in the 14th century.

Towers

- Affori Tower, Milan.
- Circus Tower, Milan. Roman tower built by Maximian in the 3rd century.
- Gorani Tower, Milan. Built by the Gorani family in the 11th century.
- Tower of Cascina Rubone, Bernate Ticino. Built in the 15th century.
- Tower of Cisliano, Cisliano. Known as Torre dei Gelsi, it was built in the 19th century.
- Tower of Truccazzano, Truccazzano. Known as the Torrettone, it was built in the 10th century.

Province of Monza and Brianza

Castles

- Aicurzio Castle, Aicurzio. Known as Castel Negrino. Built in the 13th century by the Templars.
- Bellusco Castle, Bellusco. Built in the 15th century by Martino da Corte.
- Monza Castle, Monza. Built in the 14th century by the Visconti family.
- Sulbiate Castle, Sulbiate. Known as Castello Lampugnani, it was built in the 15th century.

Towers

- Barbarossa Tower, Seregno. Built in the 12th century by Frederick I.
- Gualtieri Tower, Monza. Built in the 13th century.
- Lombard Tower, Monza. Built in the 6th century by the Lombards.
- Pessina Tower, Monza. Also known as Port scur in the local dialect, it was built in the 13th century by the Pessina family.
- San Rocco Gate, Vimercate. Fortified gate built in the 12th century.
- Vimercate Tower, Vimercate. Built in the 18th century.

Province of Pavia

Castles

- Agogna Castle, Agogna.
- Arena Po Castle, Arena Po.
- Argine Castle, Argine.
- Belgioioso Castle, Belgioioso.
- Celpenchio Castle, Celpenchio.
- Chignolo Po Castle, Chignolo Po.
- Cigognola Castle, Cigognola.
- Cozzo Castle, Cozzo.
- Fortunago Castle, Fortunago.
- Frascarolo Castle, Frascarolo.
- Gambolò Castle, Gambolò.
- Lomello Castle, Lomello.
- Montesegale Castle, Montesegale.
- Montù Berchielli Castle, Montù Berchielli.
- Oramala Castle, Oramala.
- Robbio Castle, Robbio.
- Ruino Castle, Ruino. Known as Castello dal Verme.
- San Gaudenzio Castle, San Gaudenzio, Cervesina
- Sartirana Lomellina Castle, Sartirana Lomellina.
- Scaldasole Castle, Scaldasole.
- Stefanago Castle, Stefanago.
- Valeggio Castle, Valeggio.
- Varzi Castle, Varzi.
- Vidigulfo Castle, Vidigulfo.
- Vigevano Castle, Vigevano.
- Visconti Castle, Pavia. Built in the 14th century by the Visconti family.
- Voghera Castle, Voghera.
- Zavattarello Castle, Zavattarello.

Towers

- Civic Tower of Pavia, Pavia. Built in the 11th century, the tower collapsed in 1989.

Province of Sondrio

Castles

- Andalo Valtellino Castle, Andalo Valtellino. Ruined.
- Ardenno Castle, Ardenno.
- Bellaguarda Castle, Tovo di Sant'Agata.
- Bormio Castle, Bormio. Known as Castello di S.Pietro, now ruined.
- Castel del Lance, Castione Andevenno.
- Castel Leone, Castione Andevenno.
- Chiavenna Castle, Chiavenna.
- Chiuro Castle, Chiuro.
- De Piro Castle, Montagna in Valtellina. Better known as Castel Grumello.
- Del Dosso Castle, Tirano.
- New Castle of Grosio, Grosio. Also known as Castello Visconti Venosta.
- Old Castle of Grosio, Grosio. Also known as Castello di S.Faustino.
- Mancapane Castle, Montagna in Valtellina.
- Mello Castle, Mello. Also known as Castello di Domofole or Castello della Regina.
- Mese Castle, Mese. Better known as Castello dei Peverelli.
- Rogolo Castle, Rogolo. Now ruined.
- Sondrio Castle, Sondrio. Better known as Castello Masegra.
- St.Mary Castle, Tirano. Partially ruined.
- Volardi Castle, Torre di Santa Maria.

Towers

- Albosaggia Tower, Albosaggia.
- Alberti Tower, Bormio.
- Castello dell'Acqua Tower, Castello dell'Acqua.
- De Simoni Tower, Bormio.
- Fraele Towers, Valdidentro.
- Gordona Tower, Gordona. Known as Torre del Signame, ruined.
- Mazzo di Valtellina Tower, Mazzo di Valtellina. Known as Torre di Pedenale.
- Pendolasco Tower, Torricello.
- Quadrio Tower, Chiuro. Known as Castello di S.Pietro, now ruined.
- Salmolaco Tower, Samolaco. Better known in the local dialect as Torretta di Columbée.
- Talamona Tower, Talamona.
- Teglio Tower, Teglio. Better known in the local dialect as Torre de li beli miri.
- Torelli Tower, Tirano.
- Torre delle Ore, Bormio.
- Tresivio Tower, Tresivio.

Province of Varese

Castles

- Rocca Borromeo di Angera, Angera.
- Caidate Castle, Caidate.
- Caiello Castle, Gallarate.
- Caldè Castle, Caldè.
- Castelseprio Castle, Castelseprio. Roman castrum ruined.
- Castiglione Olona Castle, Castiglione Olona.
- Visconti-Castelbarco Castle, Cislago.
- Crenna Castle, Gallarate.
- Cuasso al Monte Castle, Cuasso al Monte.
- Fagnano Olona Castle, Fagnano Olona.
- Frascarolo Castle, Induno Olona.
- Jerago Castle, Jerago.
- Orago Castle, Orago.
- Orino Castle, Orino.
- Somma Lombardo Castle, Somma Lombardo.
- Tradate Castle, Tradate.
- Masnago Castle, Varese.

Towers

- Laveno Mombello Tower, Laveno Mombello.
- Torba Tower, Gornate Olona.
- Velate Tower, Varese.

== Marches ==
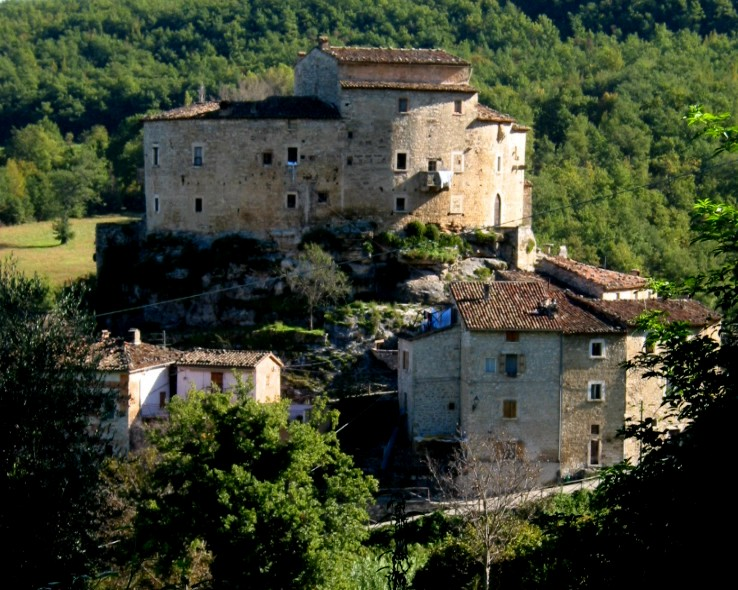
Castel di Luco, Acquasanta Terme

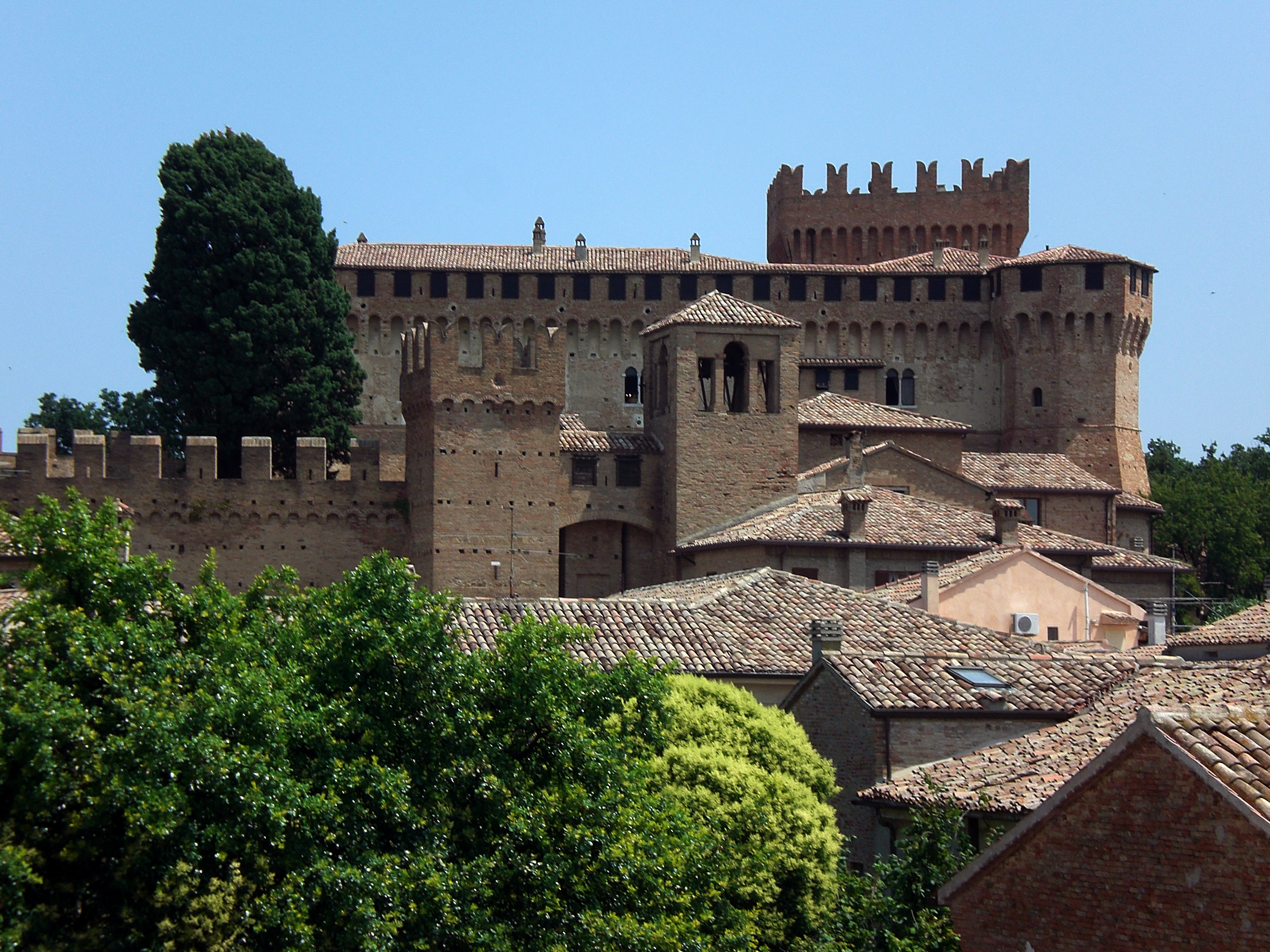
Gradara Castle, Gradara

- Castel d'Emilio, Agugliano
- Castel di Luco, Acquasanta Terme
- Castello della rancia, Tolentino
- Castello dei Brancaleoni, Piobbico
- Castello di Lanciano, Castelraimondo
- Castello di Loretello, Arcevia
- Castello di Monsampietro Morico, Monsampietro Morico
- Castello di Montelabbate, Montelabbate
- Castello Pallotta, Caldarola
- Fortezza Albornoz, Urbino
- Rocca Costanza, Pesaro
- Rocca di Bolignano, Ancona
- Rocca di Borgia, Camerino
- Rocca di Gradara, Gradara
- Rocca di Mondavio, Mondavio
- Rocca di Offagna, Offagna
- Rocca di Urbisaglia, Urbisaglia
- Rocca Roveresca, Senigallia
- Rocca Torrione, Cagli

== Molise ==
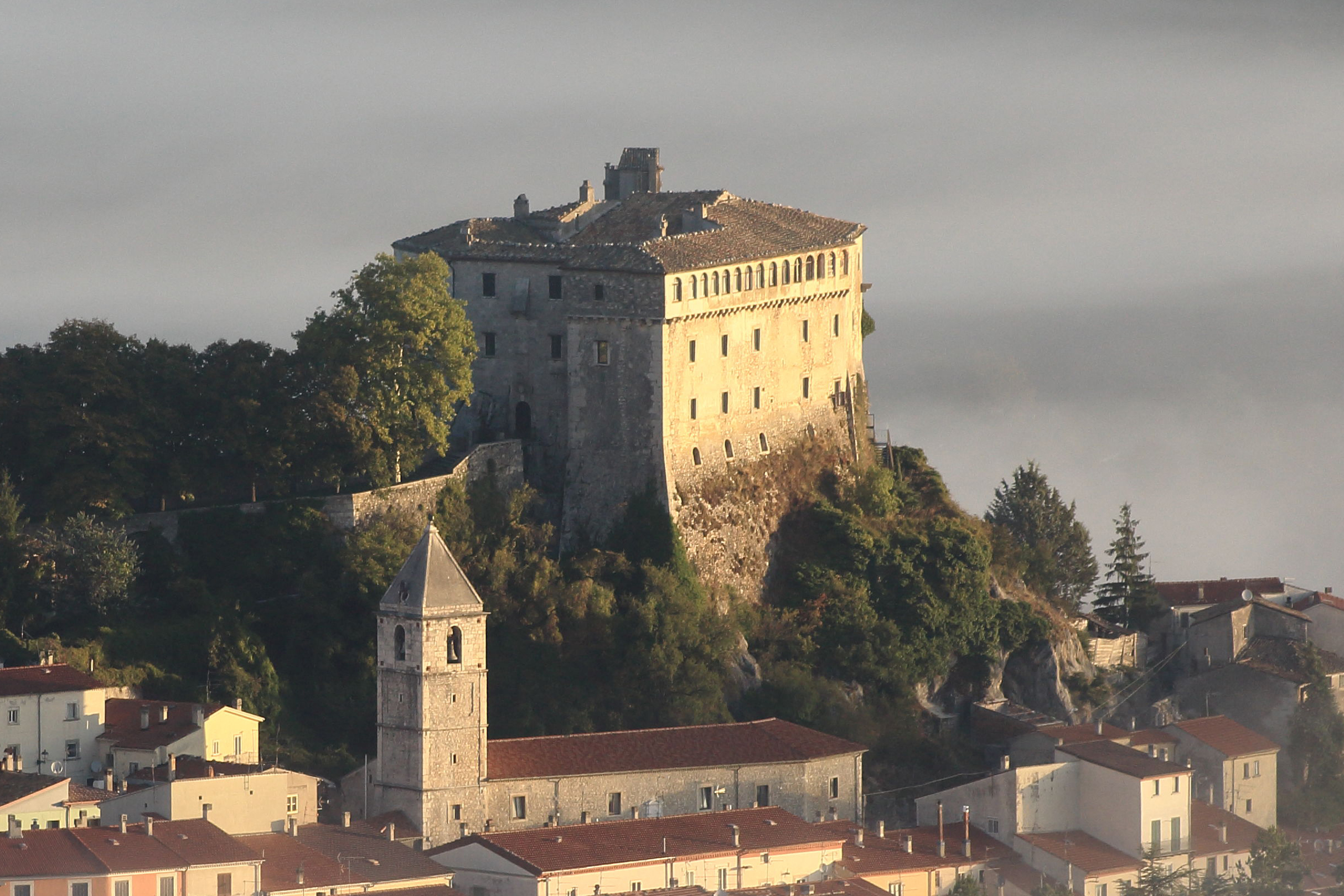
Castello D'Alessandro, Pescolanciano

- Castello Carafa, Ferrazzano
- Castello D'Alessandro, Pescolanciano
- Castello dei Pignatelli, Monteroduni
- Castello Di Capua, Gambatesa
- Castello di Pianisi, Sant'Elia a Pianisi
- Castello di Sprondasino, Civitanova del Sannio
- Castello Monforte, Campobasso
- Castello Pandone, Venafro
- Castello Svevo, Termoli

== Piedmont ==
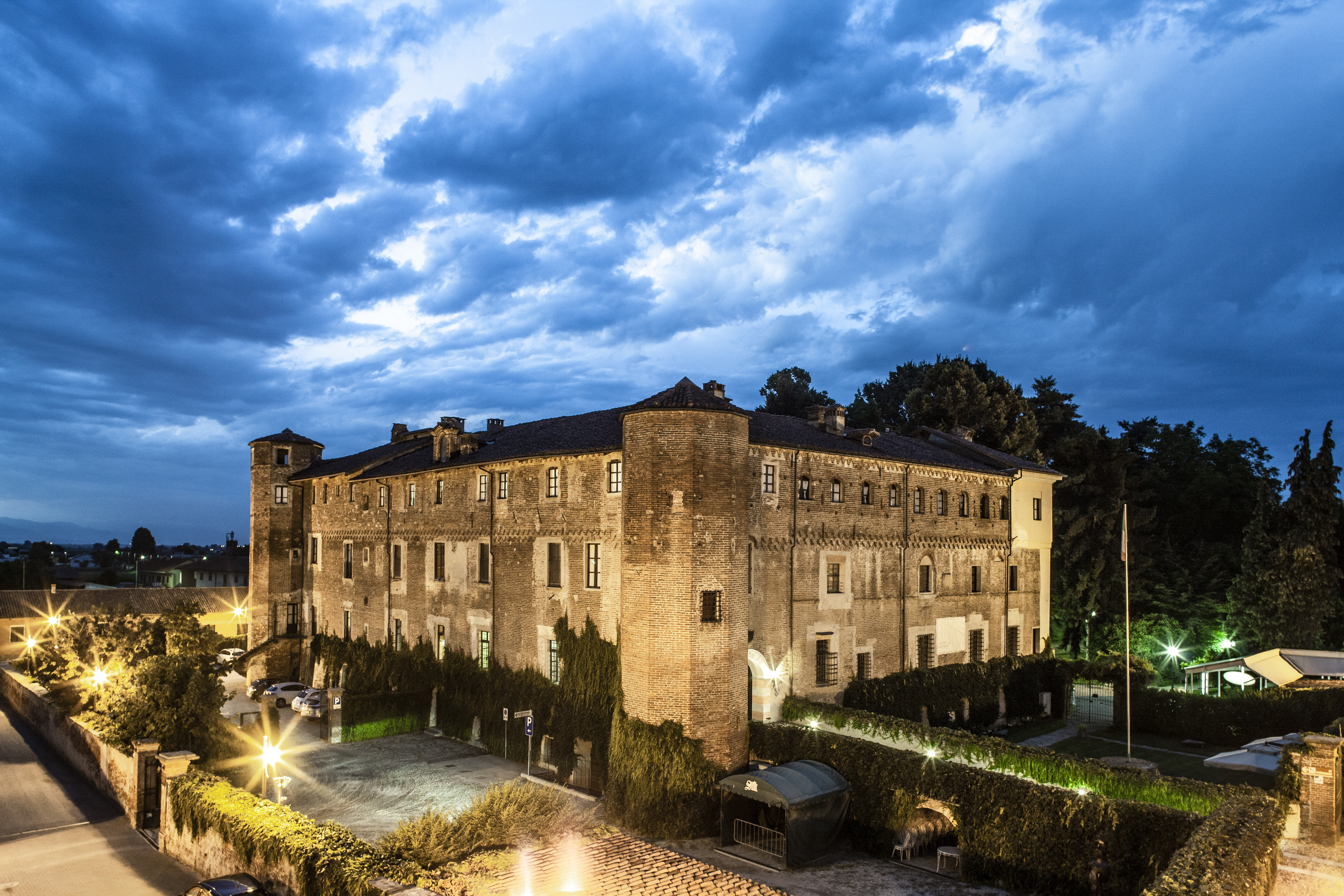
Castello dei Solaro, Villanova Solaro

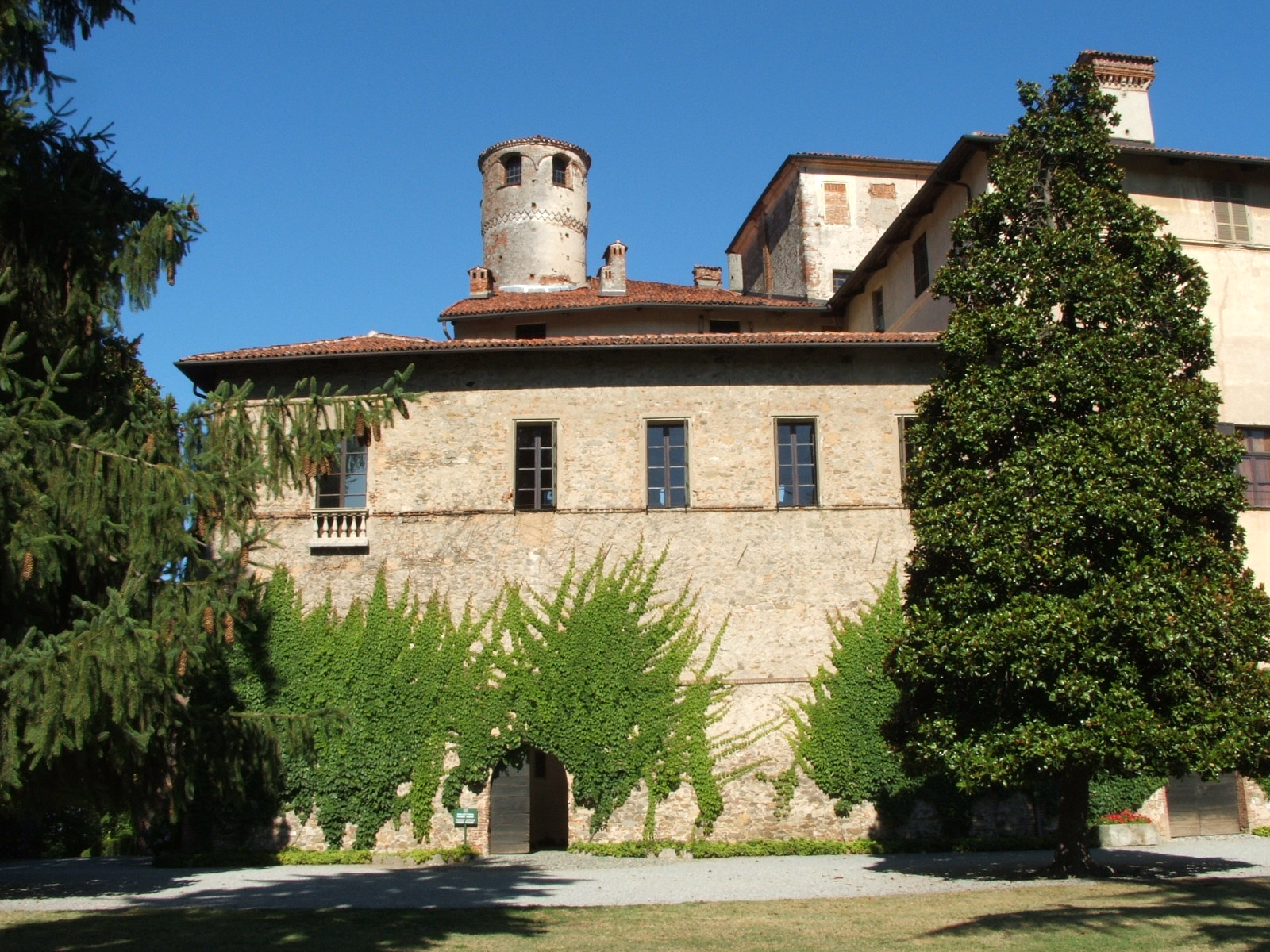
Castello della Manta, Saluzzo

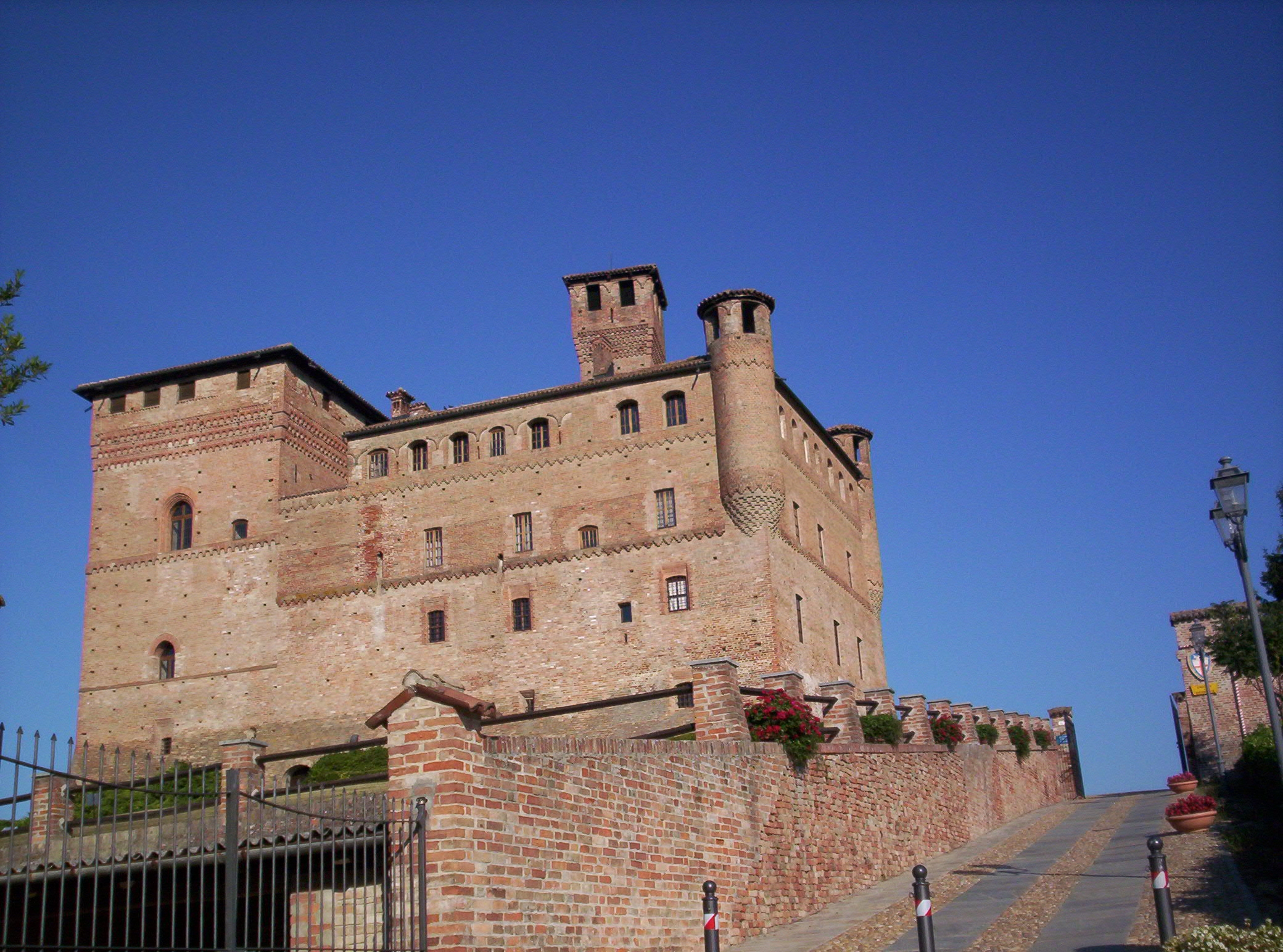
Castle of Grinzane Cavour, Grinzane Cavour

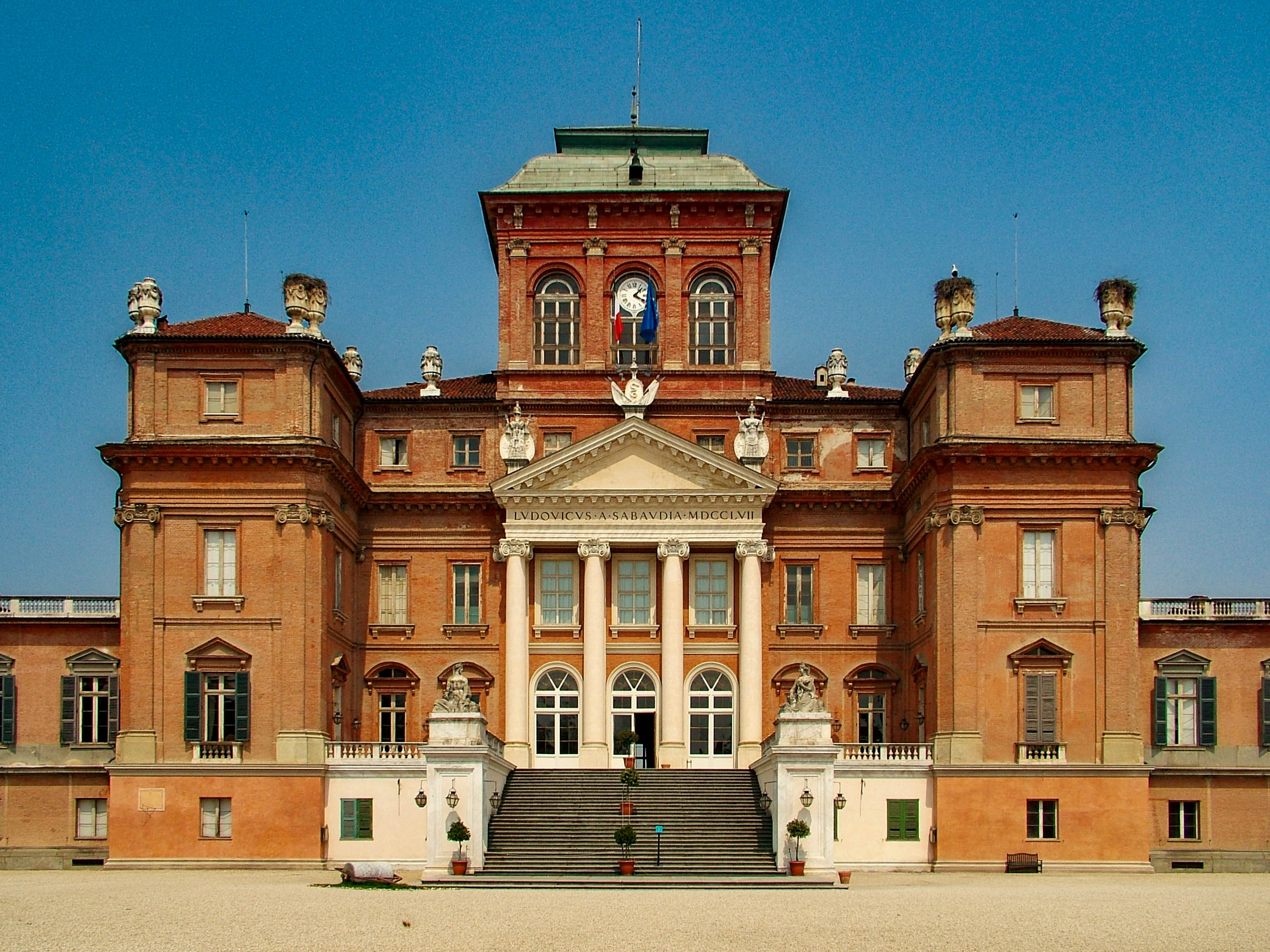
Castle of Racconigi, Racconigi

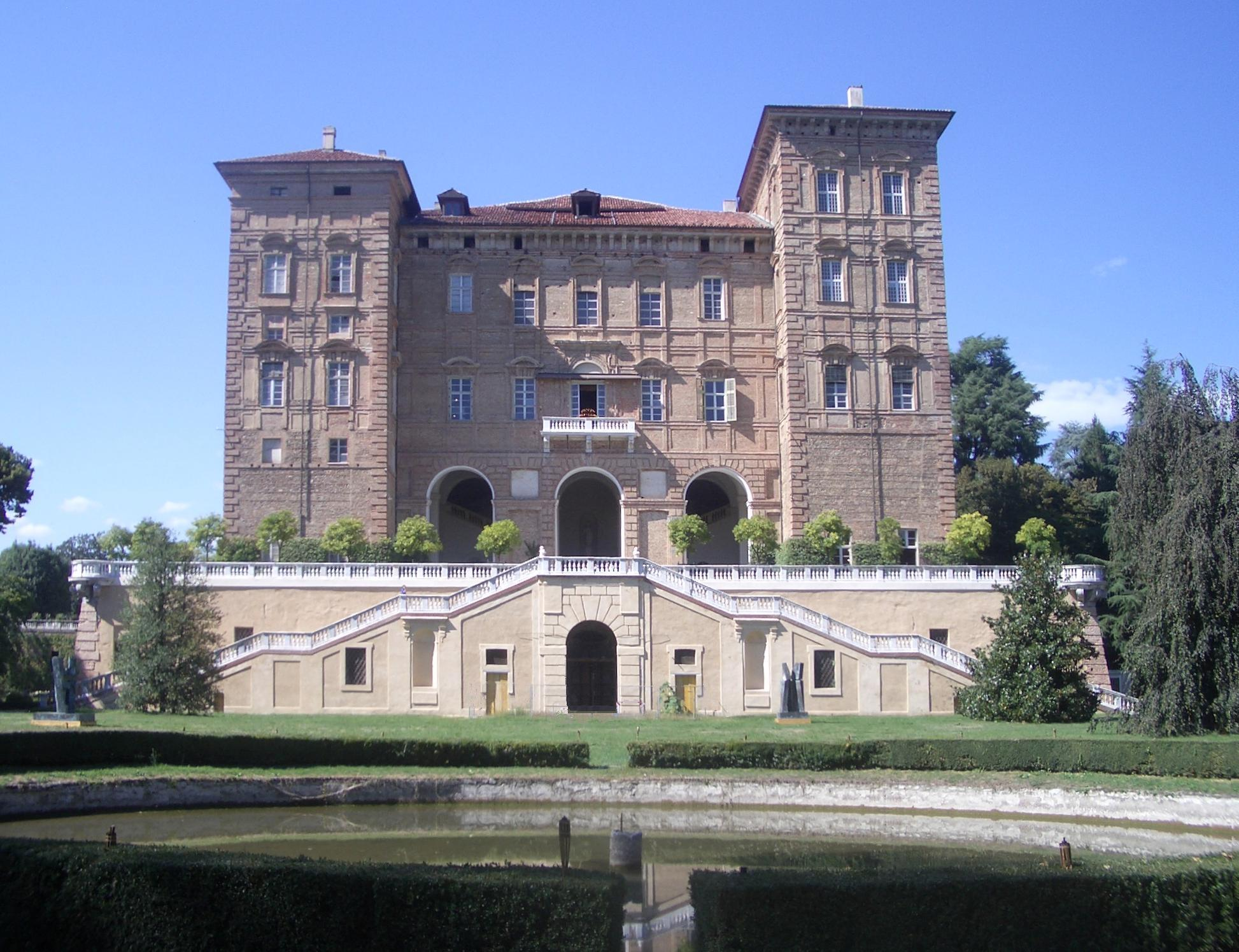
Castello ducale di Agliè, Agliè

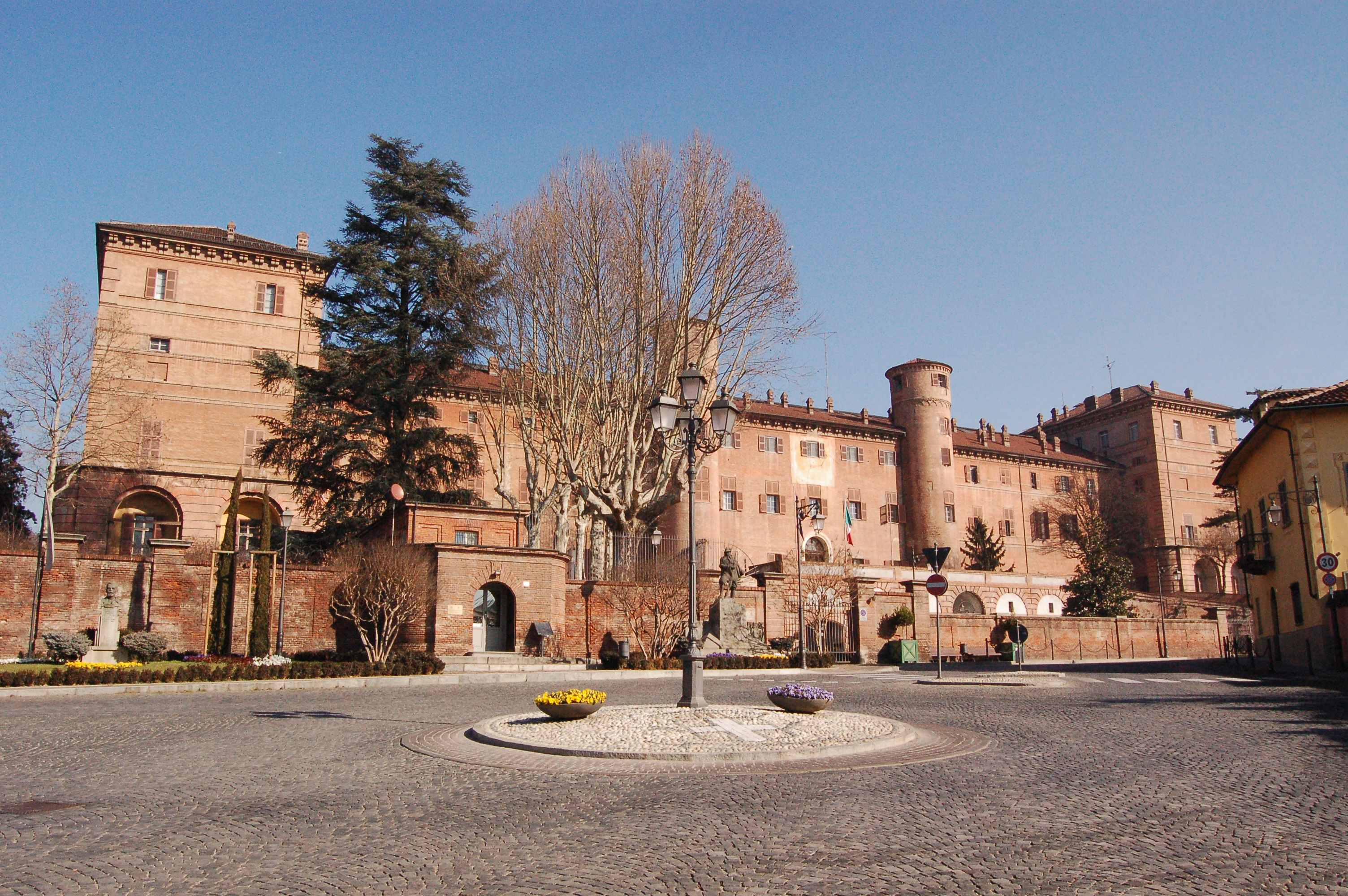
Castle of Moncalieri, Moncalieri

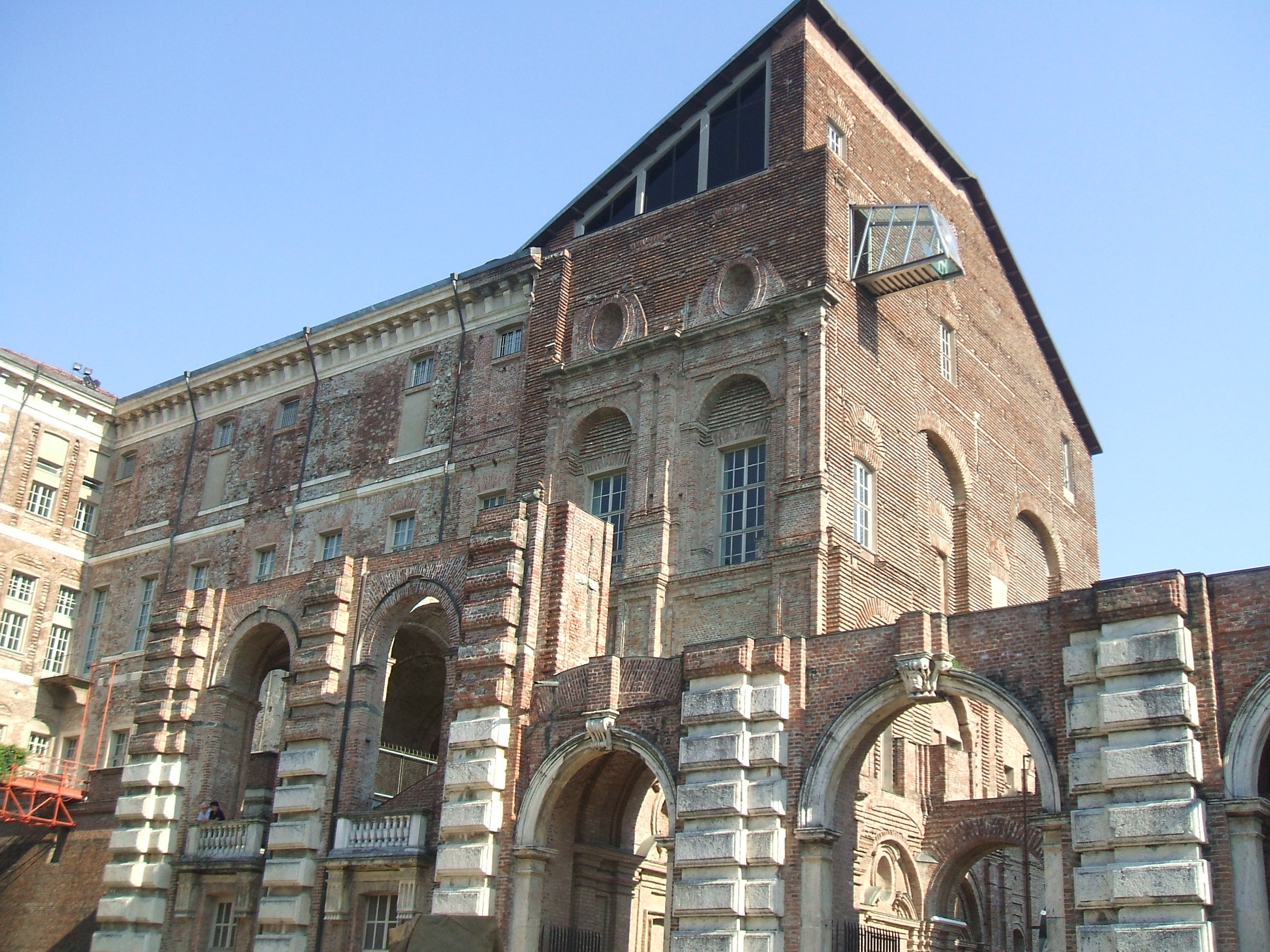
Rivoli Castle, Rivoli

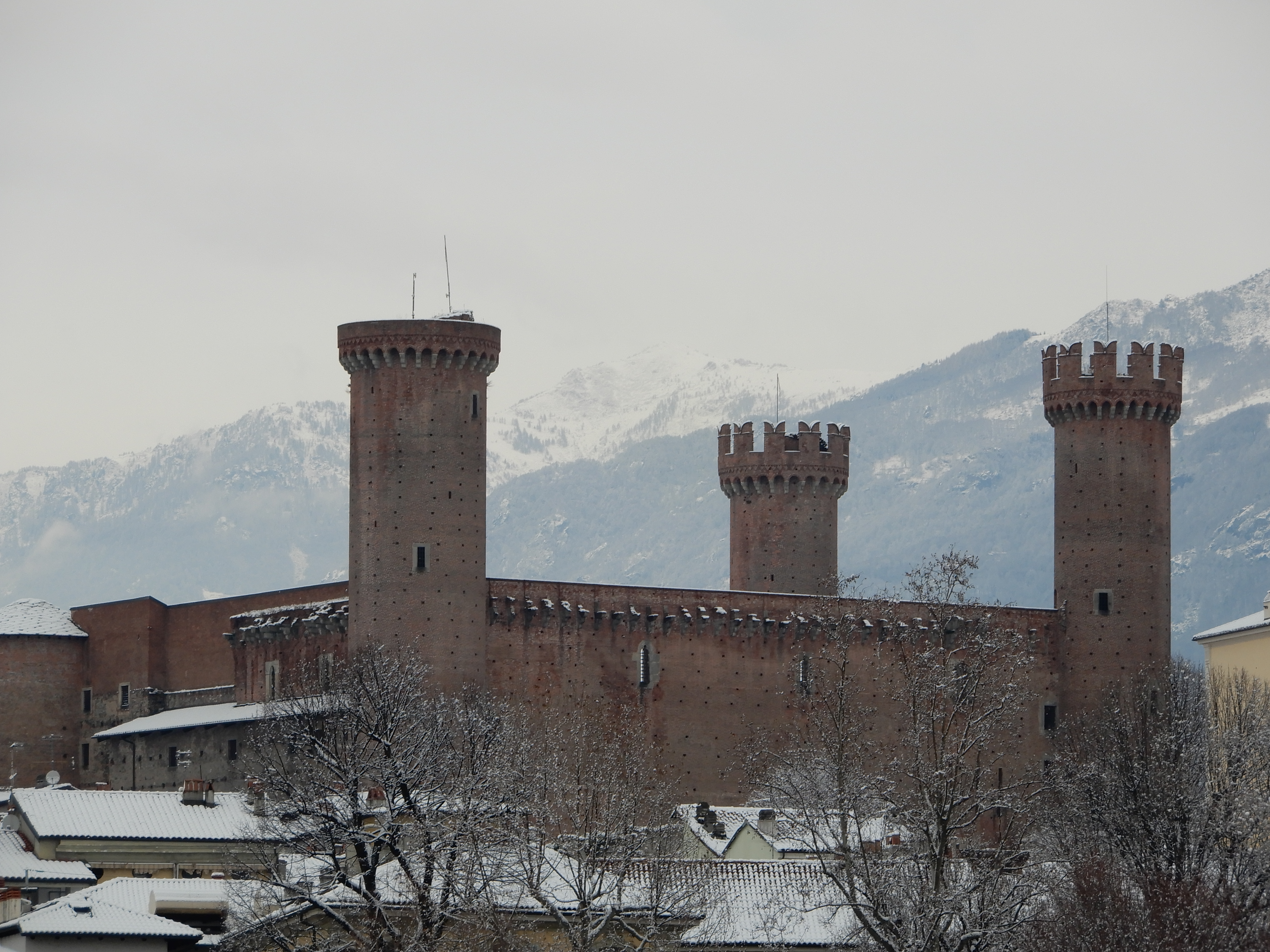
Ivrea Castle, Ivrea

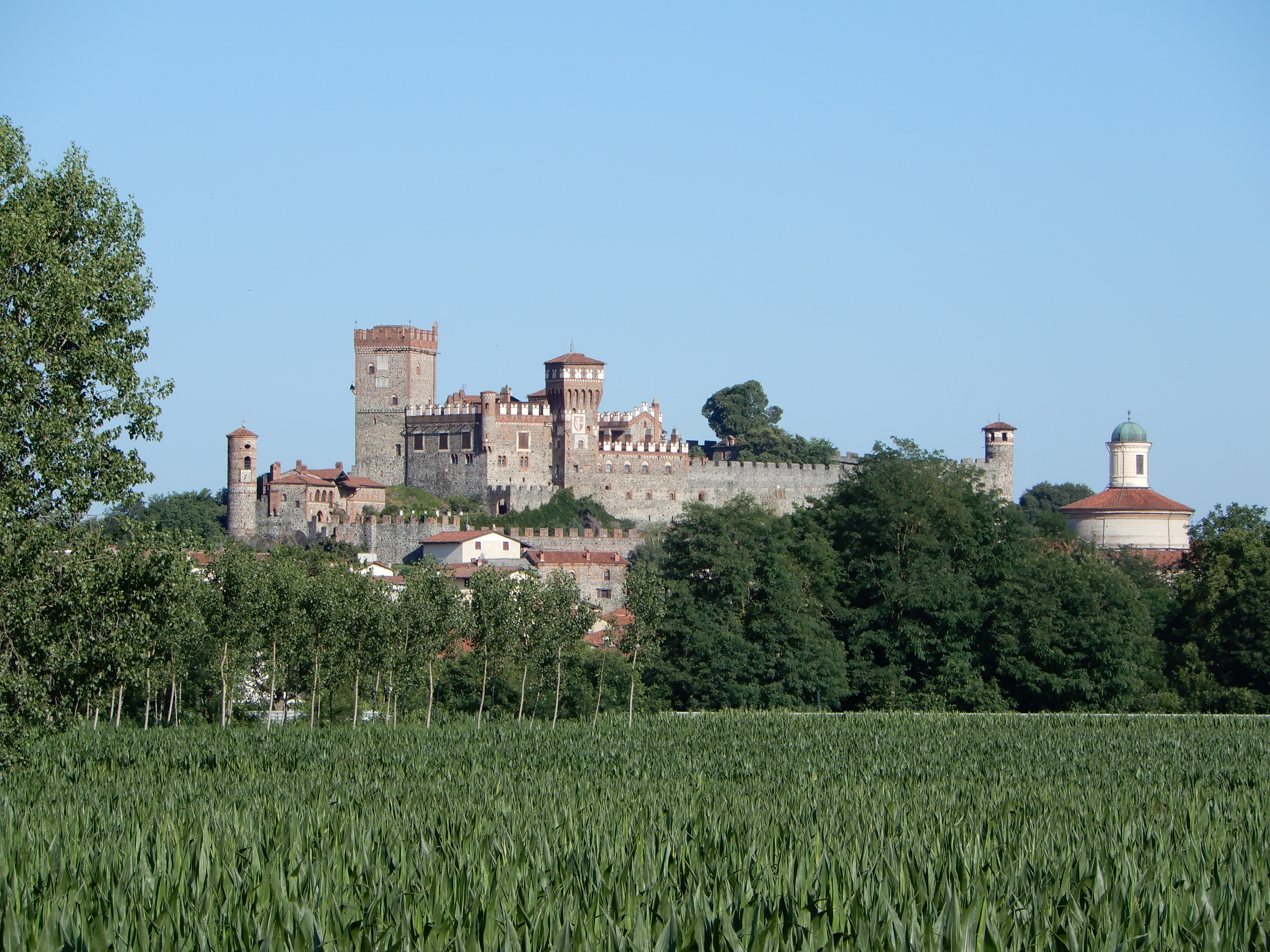
Pavone Canavese Castle, Pavone Canavese

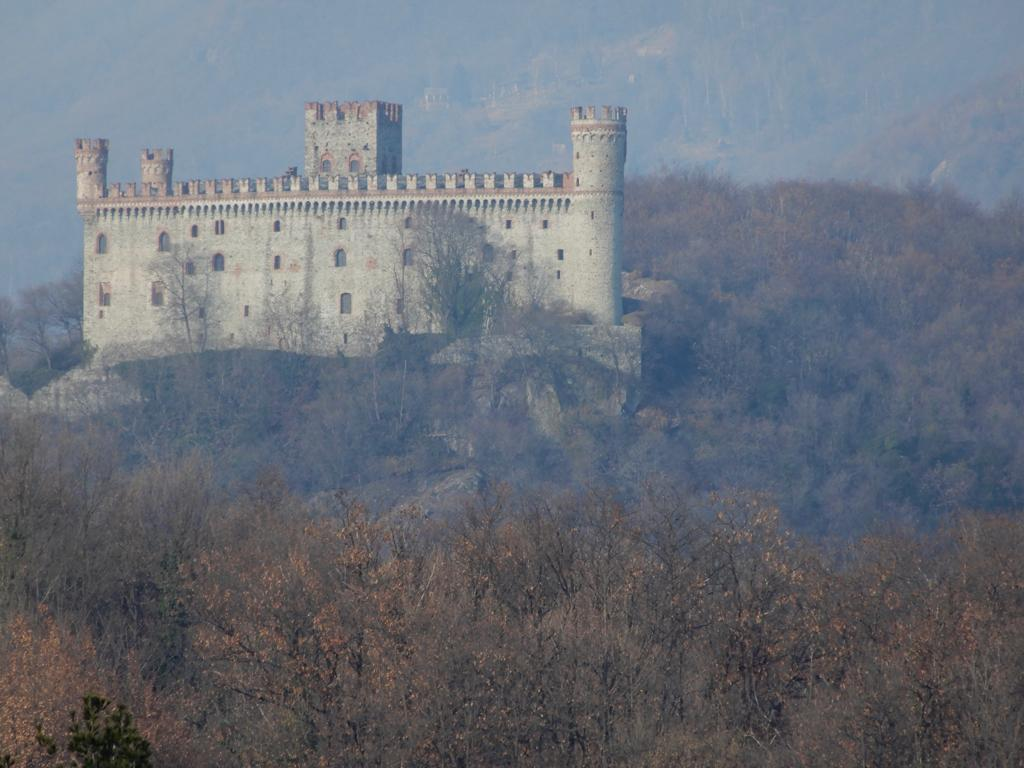
Montalto Dora Castle, Montalto Dora

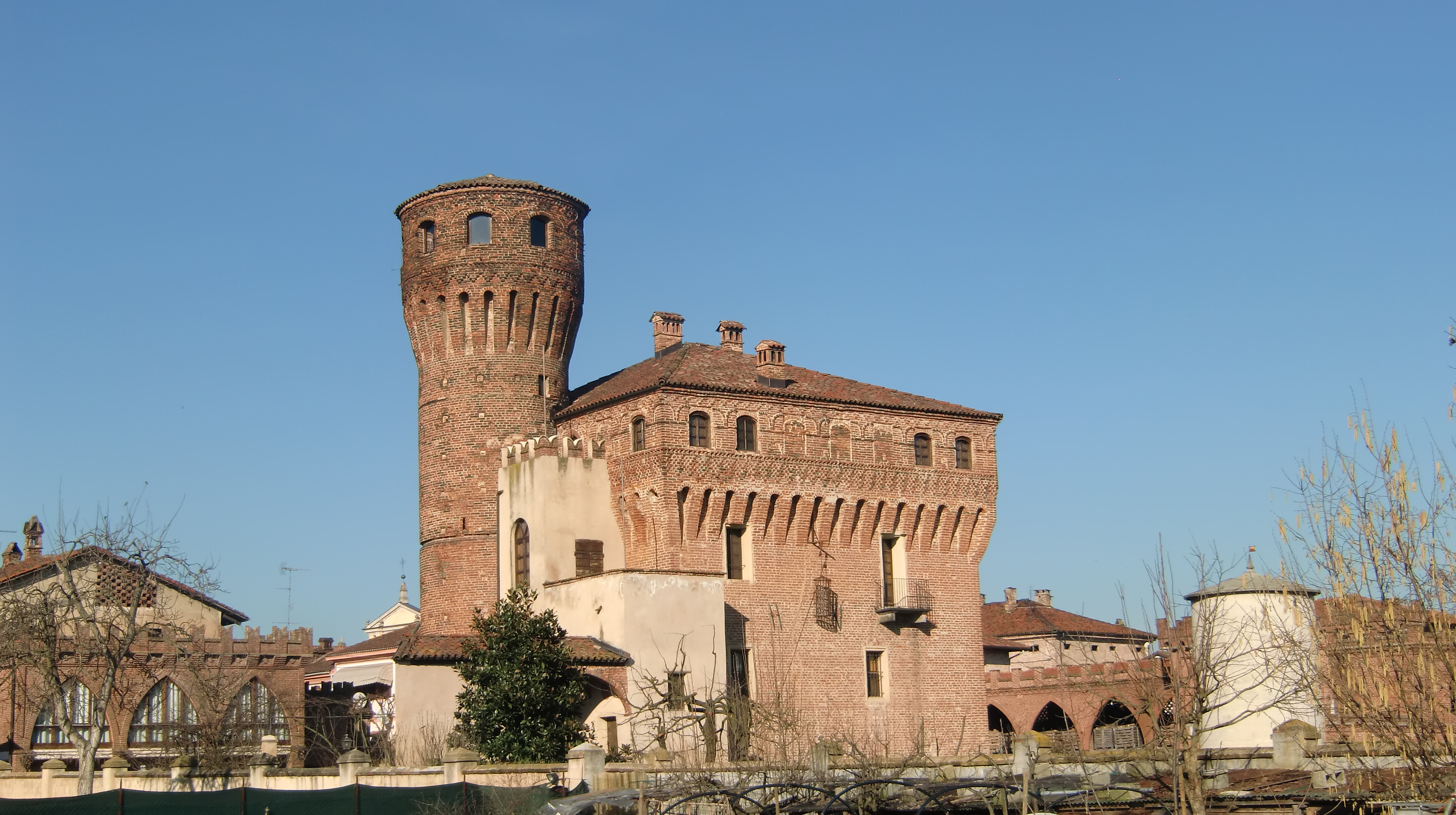
San Genuario Castle, Crescentino

Province of Alessandria

- Adorno Castle, Silvano d'Orba
- Castello dei Paleologi (Acqui Terme), Acqui Terme
- Castello dei Paleologi (Casale Monferrato), Casale Monferrato
- Castello dei Torriani e dei Bandello, Castelnuovo Scrivia
- Castello di Bergamasco, Bergamasco
- Castello di Camino, Camino
- Castello di Carbonara Scrivia, Carbonara Scrivia
- Castello di Cremolino, Cremolino
- Gabiano Castle, Gabiano
- Castello di Lajone di Quattordio, Quattordio
- Castello di Morbello, Morbello
- Castello di Morsasco, Morsasco
- Castello di Novi Ligure, Novi Ligure
- Castello di Orsara Bormida, Orsara Bormida
- Castello di Piovera, Piovera
- Castello di Pozzol Groppo, Pozzol Groppo
- Castello di Pozzolo Formigaro, Pozzolo Formigaro
- Castello di Prasco, Prasco
- Castello di Redabue a Masio, Masio
- Castello di Rocca Grimalda, Rocca Grimalda
- Tagliolo Monferrato Castle, Tagliolo Monferrato
- Castello di Torre Ratti, Borghetto di Borbera
- Castello Sannazzaro di Giarole, Giarole
- Villadeati Castle, Villadeati
- Cittadella of Alessandria, Alessandria
- Forte di Gavi, Gavi
- Palazzo Bricherasio di Fubine, Fubine
- Torre di Novi Ligure, Novi Ligure
- Torre dei Paleologi, San Salvatore Monferrato

Province of Asti

- Castello di Bubbio, Bubbio
- Castello di Burio, Burio, Costigliole d'Asti
- Castello di Castelnuovo Calcea, Castelnuovo Calcea
- Castello di Costigliole d'Asti, Costigliole d'Asti
- Castello di Monastero Bormida, Monastero Bormida
- Montemagno Monferrato Castle, Montemagno Monferrato
- Montiglio Monferrato Castle, Montiglio Monferrato

Province of Biella

- Castellengo Castle, Cossato
- Castello di Cerreto, Cerreto Castello
- Castello di Valdengo, Valdengo
- Castello di Verrone, Verrone
- Roppolo Castle, Roppolo
- Zumaglia Castle, Zumaglia

Province of Cuneo

- Barbaresco Castle, Barbaresco
- Barolo Castle, Barolo
- Castello dei Solaro, Villanova Solaro
- Castello della Manta, Saluzzo
- Grinzane Cavour Castle, Grinzane Cavour
- Guarene Castle, Guarene
- Racconigi Castle, Racconigi
- Serralunga d'Alba Castle, Serralunga d'Alba

Province of Novara

- Barengo Castle, Barengo
- Castello di Briona, Briona
- Castello di Caltignaga, Caltignaga
- Castello di Nibbiola, Nibbiola
- Castello dal Pozzo, Oleggio Castello
- Proh Castle, Briona

Province of Turin

- Agliè Castle, Agliè
- Albiano d'Ivrea Castle, Albiano d'Ivrea
- Avigliana Castle, Avigliana
- Azeglio Castle, Azeglio
- Baldissero Canavese Castle, Baldissero Canavese
- Banchette Castle, Banchette
- Bardassano Castle, Gassino Torinese
- Barone Canavese Castle, Barone Canavese
- Bollengo Castle, Bollengo
- Brusasco Castle, Brusasco
- Bruzolo Castle, Bruzolo
- Candia Canavese Castle, Candia Canavese
- Castagneto Po Castle, Castagneto Po
- Castellamonte Castle, Castellamonte
- Cesnola Castle, Settimo Vittone
- Chianocco Castle, Chianocco
- Cinzano Castle, Cinzano
- Favria Castle, Favria
- Foglizzo Castle, Foglizzo
- Front Castle, Front
- Grosso Castle, Grosso
- Ivrea Castle, Ivrea
- Loranzè Castle, Loranzè
- Malgrà Castle, Rivarolo Canavese
- Masino Castle, Caravino
- Mazzè Castle, Mazzè
- Moncalieri Castle, Moncalieri
- Montanaro Castle, Montanaro
- Montalto Dora Castle, Montalto Dora
- Montestrutto Castle, Settimo Vittone
- Monteu da Po Castle, Monteu da Po Castle
- Ozegna Castle, Ozegna
- Pavone Canavese Castle, Pavone Canavese
- Parella Castle, Parella
- Rivara Castle, Rivara
- Rivarossa Castle, Rivarossa
- Rivoli Castle, Rivoli
- Sambuy Castle, San Mauro Torinese
- Samone Castle, Samone
- San Giorgio Canavese Castle, San Giorgio Canavese
- San Sebastiano da Po Castle, San Sebastiano da Po
- Strambinello Castle, Strambinello
- Strambino Castle, Strambino
- Torre Canavese Castle, Torre Canavese
- Valperga Castle, Valperga
- Castello di Venaria Reale, Turin
- Palazzo Madama, Turin

Province of Vercelli

- Balocco Castle, Balocco
- Castello di Buronzo, Buronzo
- Desana Castle, Desana
- Moncrivello Castle, Moncrivello
- Castello di Rovasenda, Rovasenda
- San Genuario Castle, Crescentino
- Castello di Vettignè, Vettignè
- Castello Visconteo Vercelli

== Sardinia ==
Cagliari

1. Castello di San Michele, Cagliari
2. Palazzo Reale, Cagliari

City palaces of Cagliari and fortifications of the town are not noted here.

Province of Nuoro

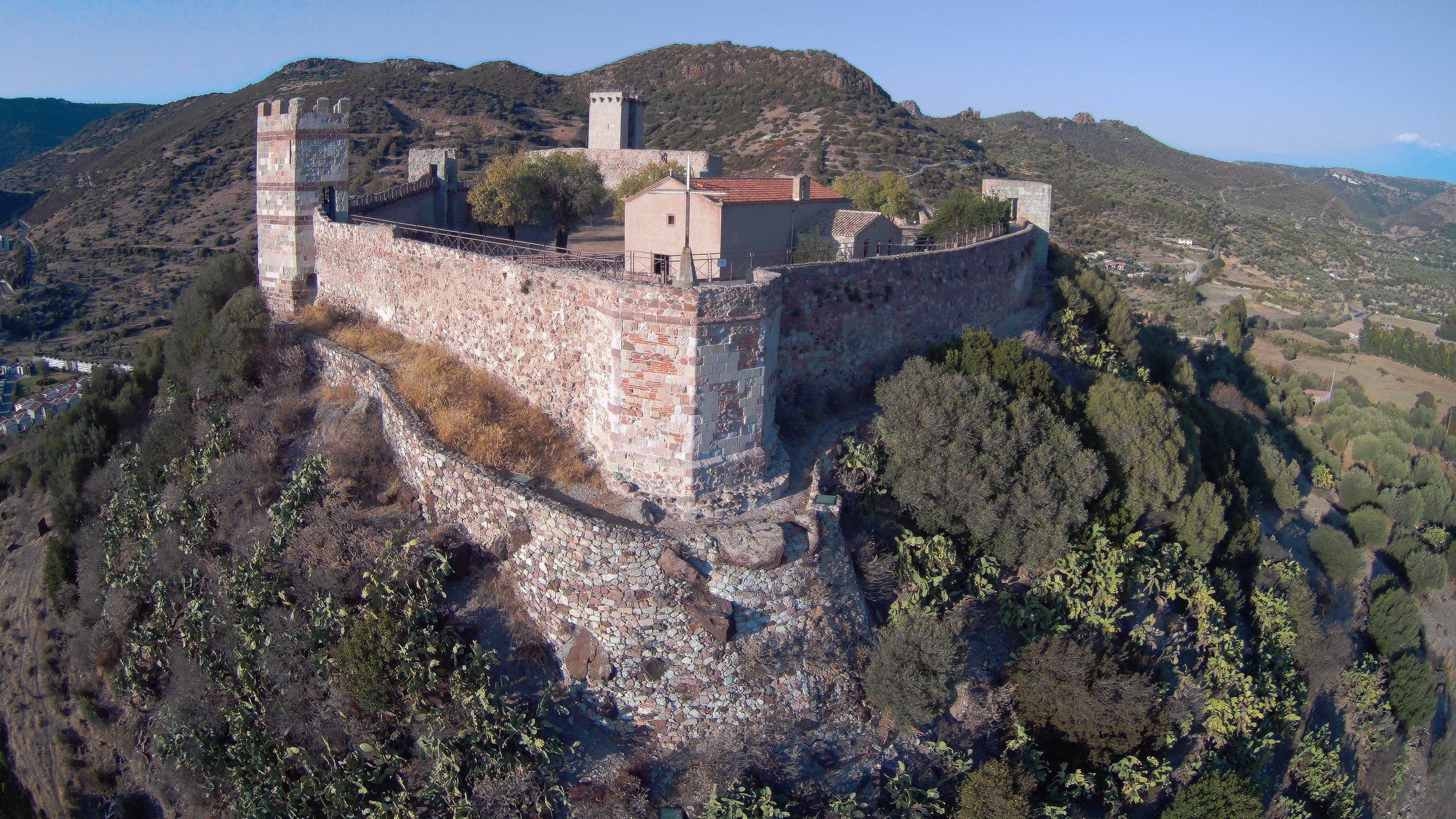
Castle Malaspina, Bosa

1. Castello della Fava, Posada
2. Castello di Pontes, Galtellì
3. Castello di Medusa, Lotzorai

Province of Oristano

1. Castello di Ghilarza, Ghilarza
2. Castello Malaspina ( Castello di Serravalle or Castello Bosa), Bosa
3. Castello di Medusa, Samugheo
4. Castello del Montiferru (Casteddu Ezzu), Cuglieri

Province of Sassari

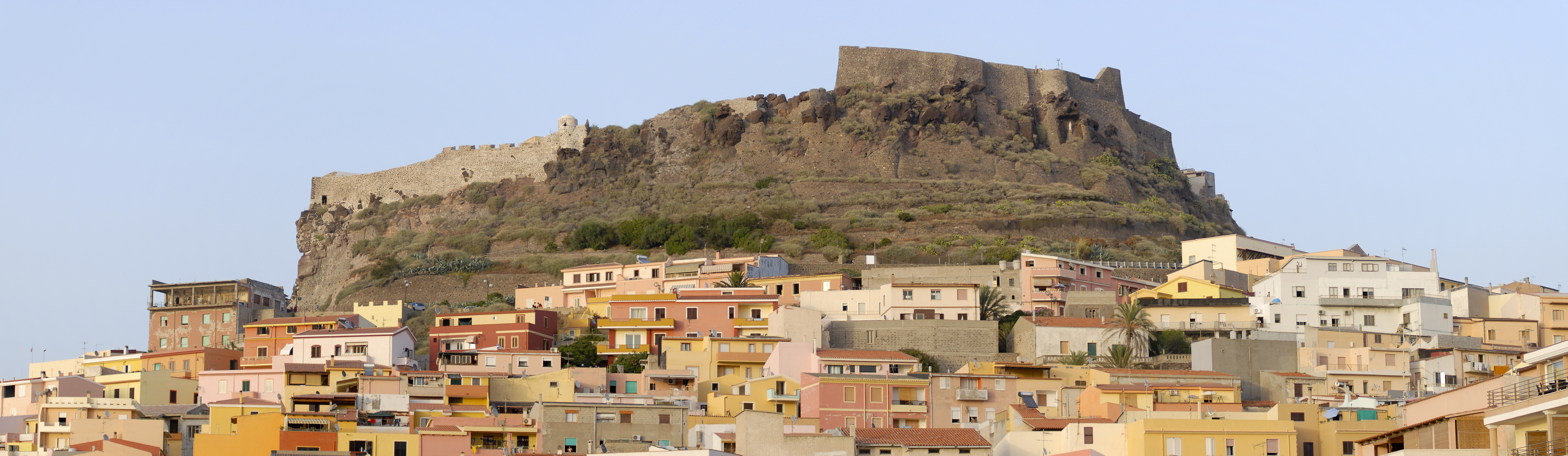
Castelsardo

1. Castello di Burgos (Castello del Goceano), Burgos
2. Castello di Casteldoria, Santa Maria Coghinas
3. Castello di Castelsardo, Castelsardo
4. Castello di Chiaramonti (Castello dei Doria), Chiaramonti
5. Castello Malaspina (Castello di Osilo), Osilo
6. Castello di Monteleone Rocca Doria, Monteleone Rocca Doria
7. Castello di Pedres, Olbia
8. Castello di Sassari, Sassari

Province of South Sardinia

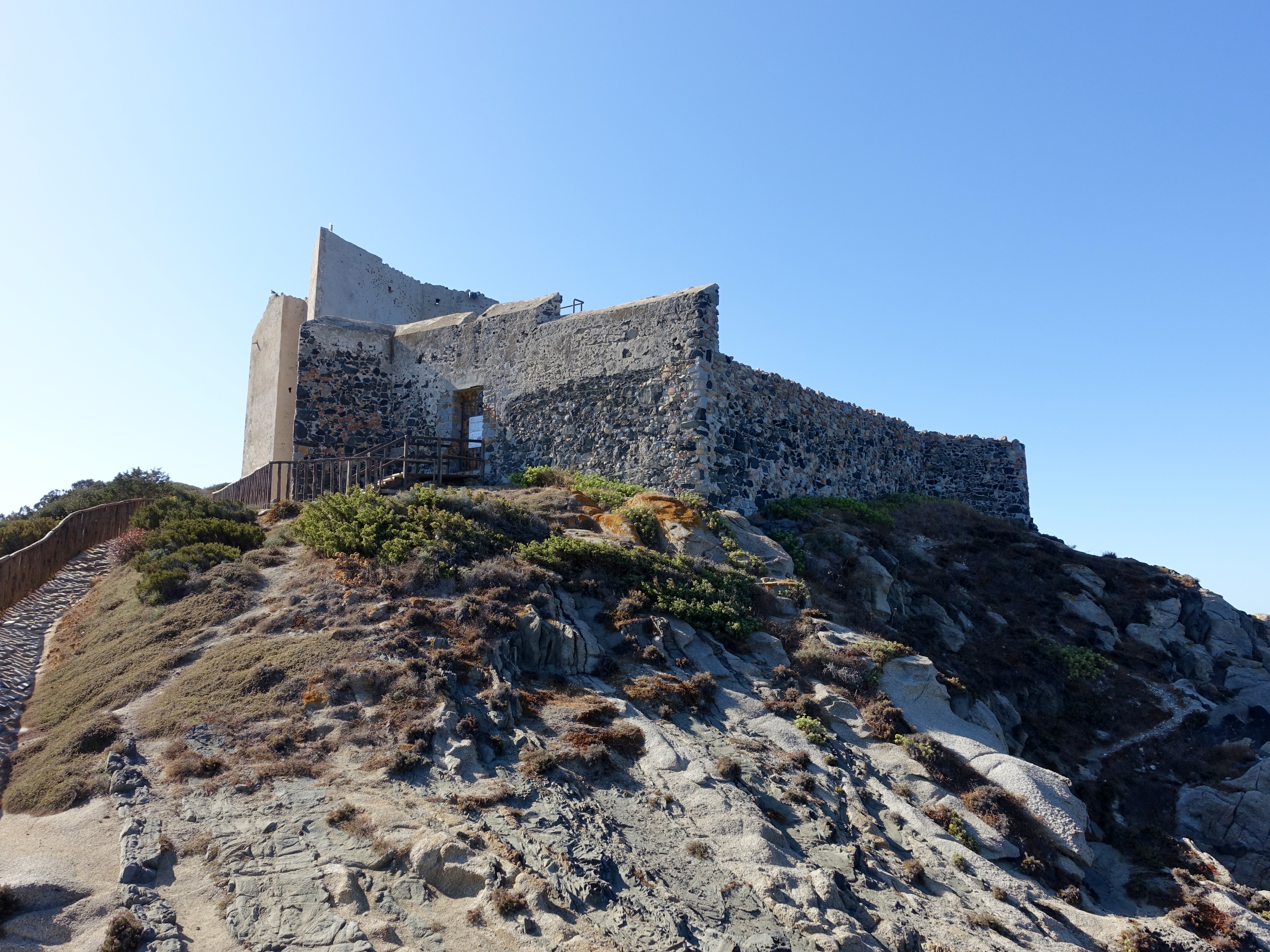
Ruins of the fortress’’Fortezza Vecchia’’

1. Castello di Acquafredda, Siliqua-Cixerri
2. Castello di Arcuentu (Castello di Erculentu), Arbus, castle ruins on Monte Arcuentu
3. Castello di Baratuli ( Castello di Monte Oladiri), Monastir
4. Casa Fortezza Marchesi de Silva, Villasor
5. Castello di Gioiosa Guardia, Villamassargia
6. Castello di Salvaterra ( Castello di Iglesias), Iglesias
7. Castello di Las Plassas (Castello di Marmilla), Las Plassas
8. Castello di Monreale, Sardara
9. Castello di Quirra, Villaputzu-Quirra, (39.5302664°N 9.6026389°E)
10. Castello di Sanluri, Sanluri
11. Castello di Sassai (Castello Orguglioso or Castello Orgoglioso), Silius
12. Castello di Villasor (Castello Siviller (di Villasor)), Villasor
13. Fortezza Vecchia di Villasimius, Villasimius

== Sicily ==
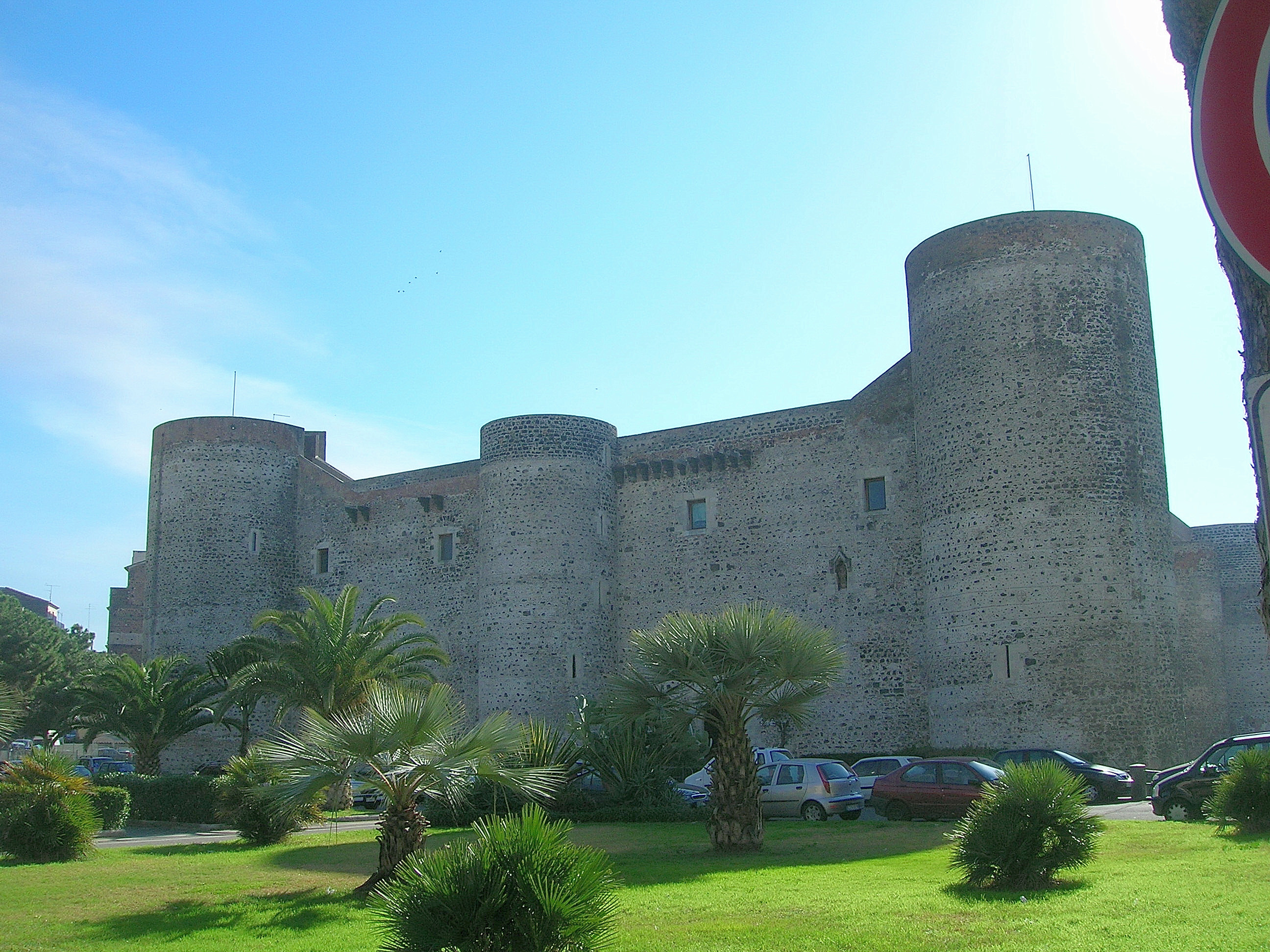
Castello Ursino, Catania

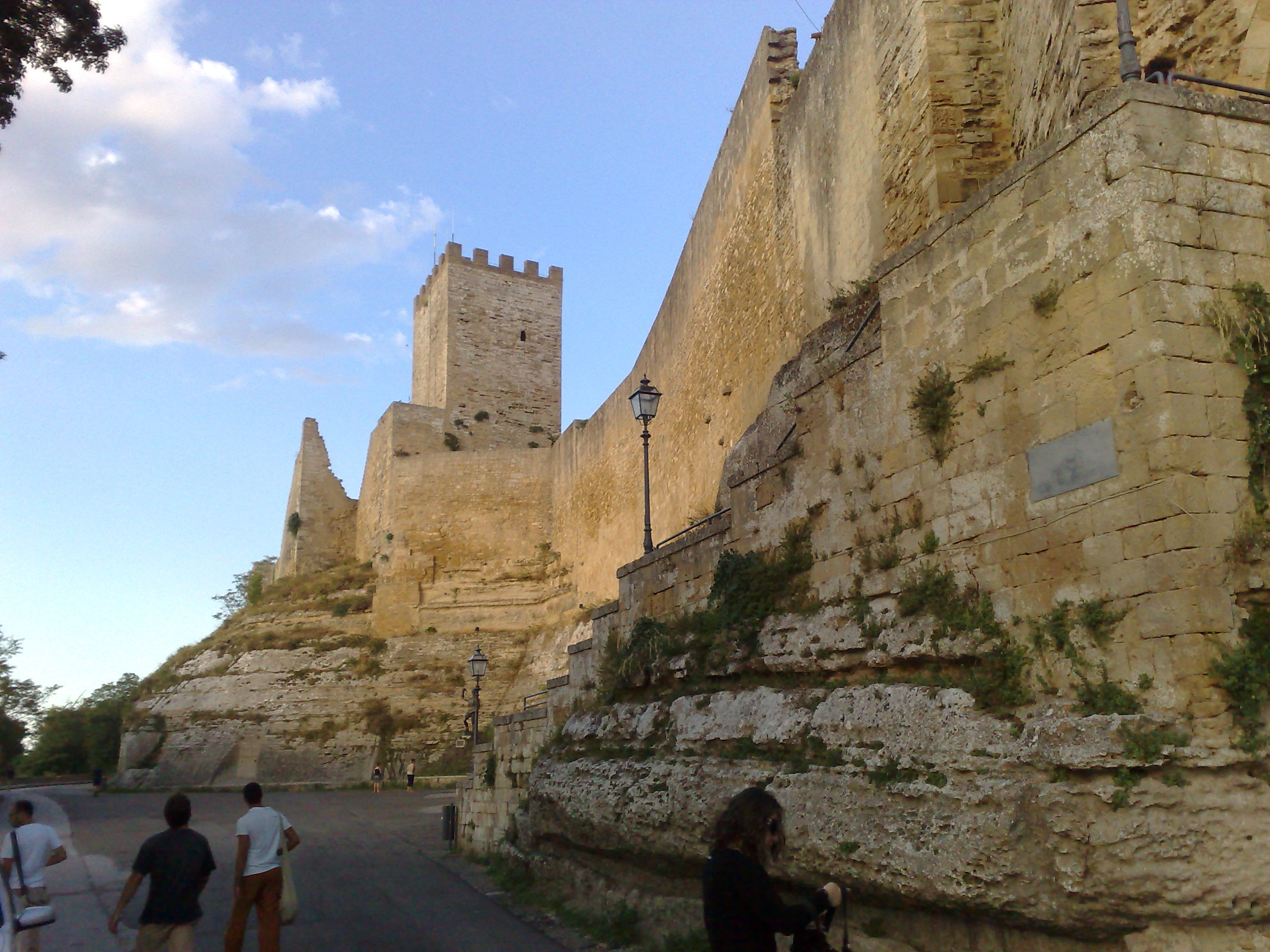
Castello di Lombardia, Enna

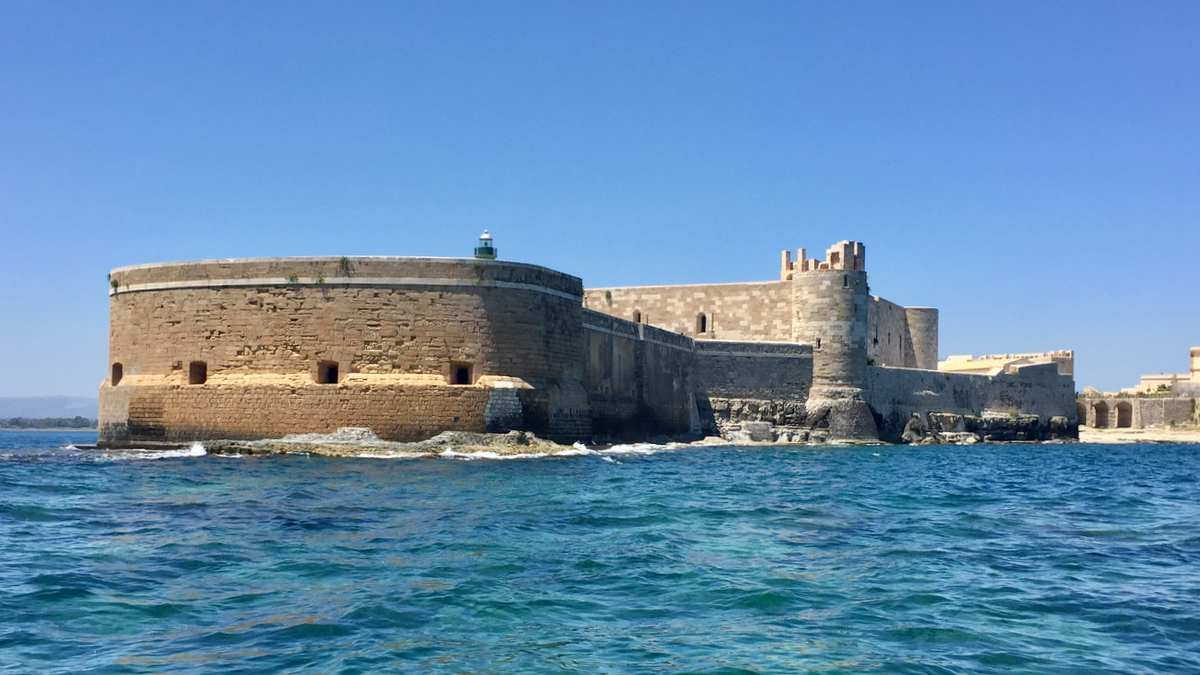
Castello Maniace, Syracuse

In Sicily there are 350 medieval castles and hundreds of other historical periods.

- Castello Normanno, Aci Castello
- Castello Normanno of Adrano
- Castello di Agrigento, Agrigento
- Castello di Calatubo, Alcamo
- Castello dei Conti di Modica, Alcamo
- Castello della Pietra d'Amico, Alessandria della Rocca
- Castello di Barrugeri, Aragona
- Castello di Bivona, Bivona
- Castello di Caccamo, Caccamo
- Castellazzo di Camastra, Camastra
- Castello di Bifar, Campobello di Licata
- Castello Ursino, Catania
- Castello di Lombardia, Enna
- Castello di Schisò, Giardini Naxos
- Mategriffon, Messina
- Castello di Milazzo, Milazzo
- Castello di Mussomeli
- Castelbuono, Palermo
- Cuba, Palermo
- Zisa, Palermo
- Castello Normanno, Paternò
- Castello di Donnafugata, Ragusa
- Castle of the Counts Luna, Sciacca
- Castello di Euryalos, Syracuse
- Castello Maniace, Syracuse
- Castello di Villagonia, Taormina
- Castello di Terra, Trapani

== Trentino-Alto Adige/Südtirol ==
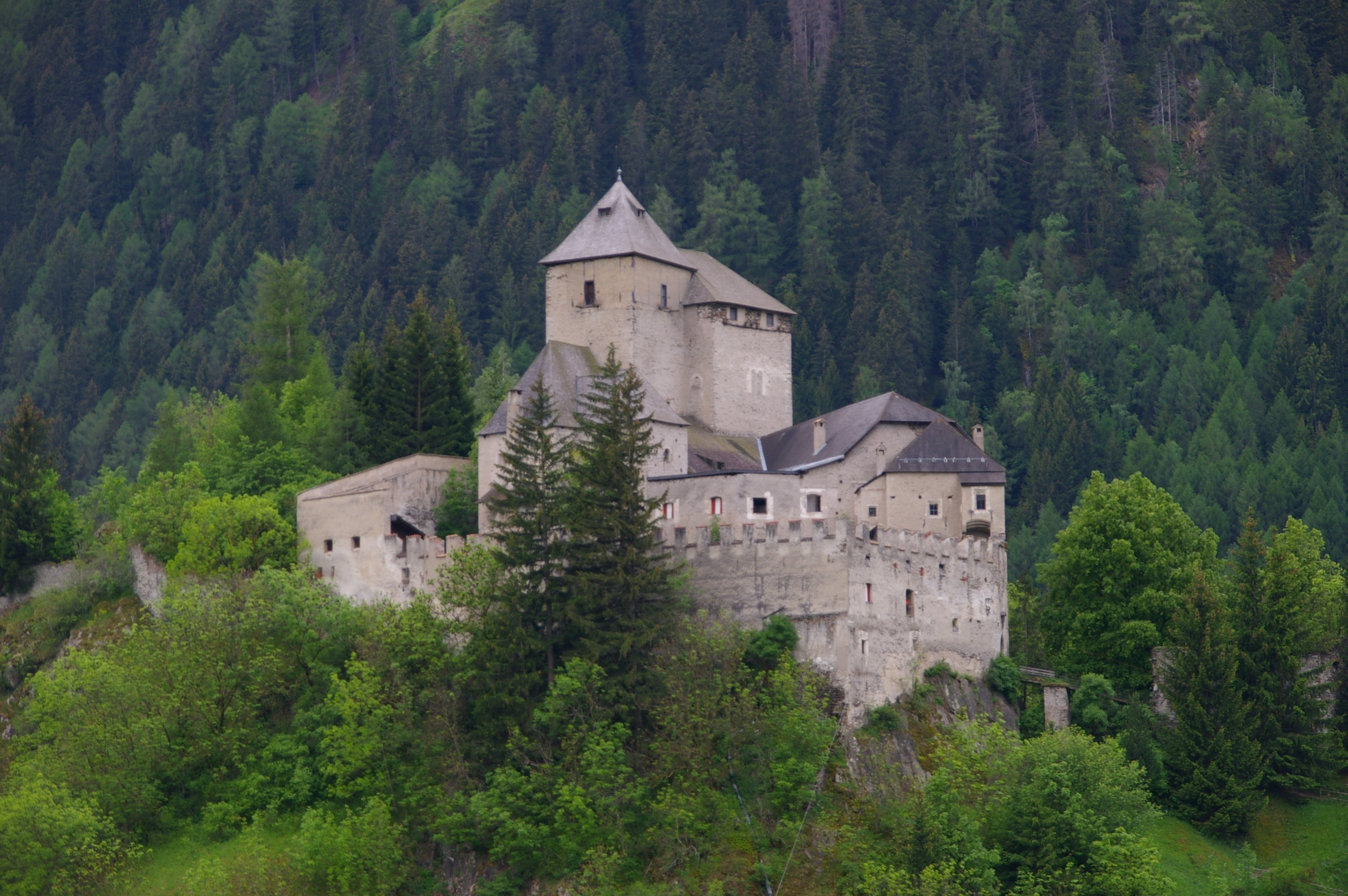
Reifenstein Castle, Freienfeld

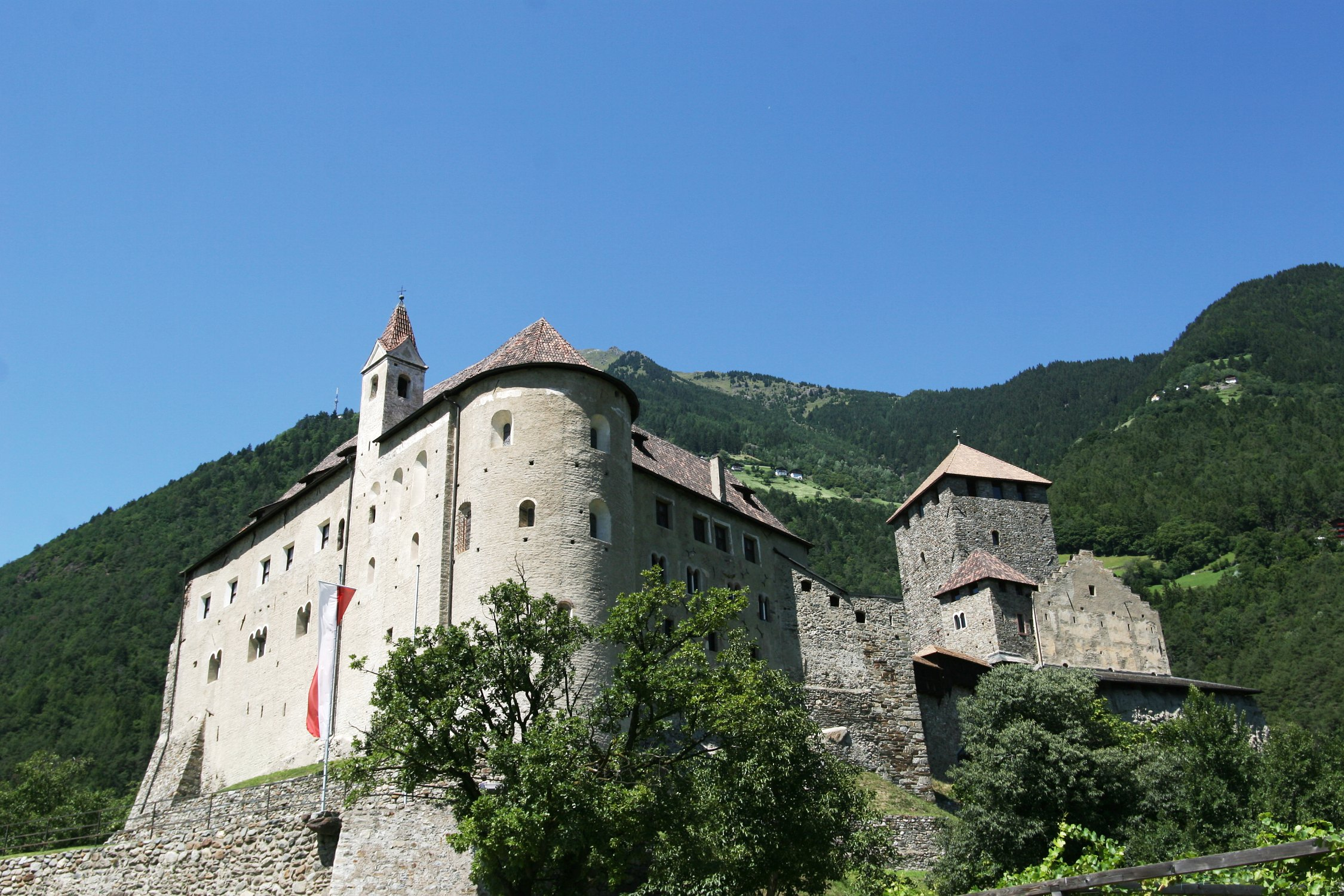
Castle Tyrol, Meran

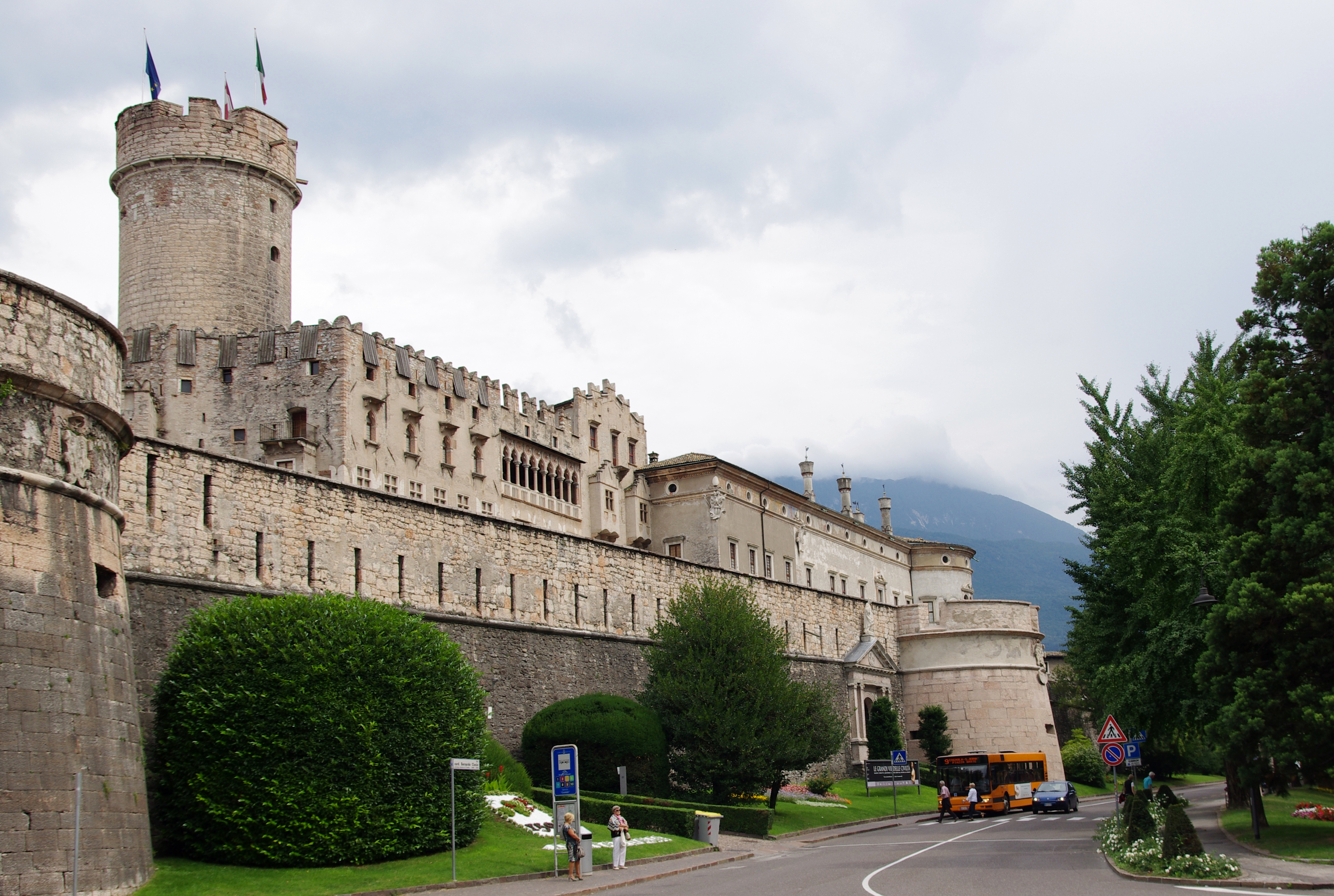
Castello del Buonconsiglio, Trento

- Castello di Arco, Arco
- Sabbionara Castle, Avio
- Castel Mareccio (Schloss Maretsch), Bolzano
- Castel Sant'Antonio, Bolzano
- Runkelstein Castle, Bolzano
- Sigmundskron Castle, Bolzano
- Treuenstein Castle, Bolzano
- Castel Vanga, Bolzano
- Castello di Brunico, Brunico
- Castle of Castellano, Castellano
- Reifenstein Castle (Castel Tasso), Freienfeld
- Castel Ivano, Ivano-Fracena
- Ehrenburg, Kiens
- Castel Toblino, Madruzzo
- Schloss Brunnenburg, Merano
- Castel Fontana, Merano
- Castle Tyrol, Merano
- Trauttmansdorff Castle, Merano
- Castel Verruca, Merano
- Castello di Rovereto, Rovereto
- Castle Taufers, Sand in Taufers
- Castel Gardena, Santa Cristina Gherdëina
- Churburg
- Castel Thun, Ton
- Castello del Buonconsiglio, Trento
- Prösels Castle, Völs am Schlern

== Tuscany ==
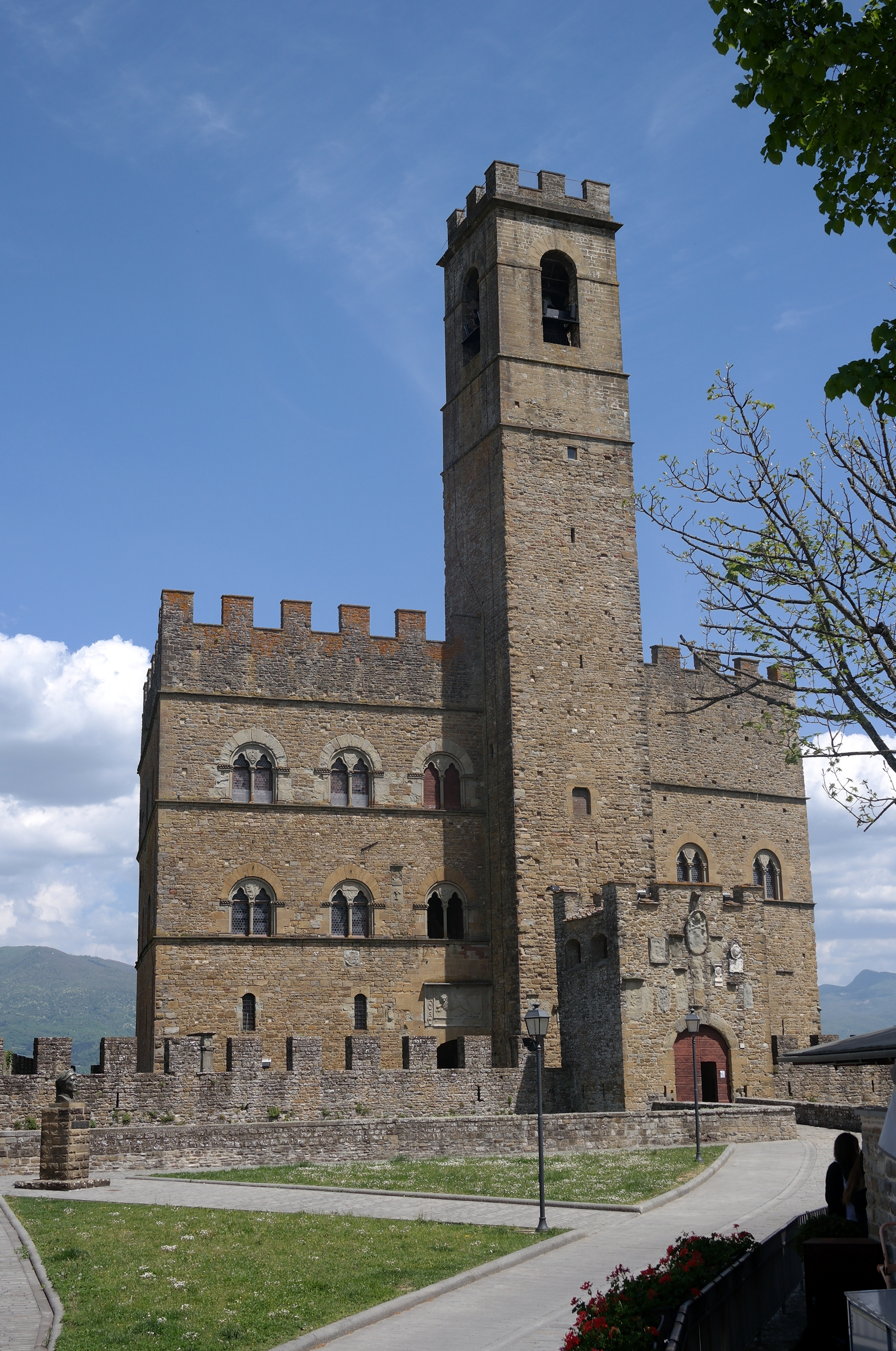
Poppi Castle, Poppi

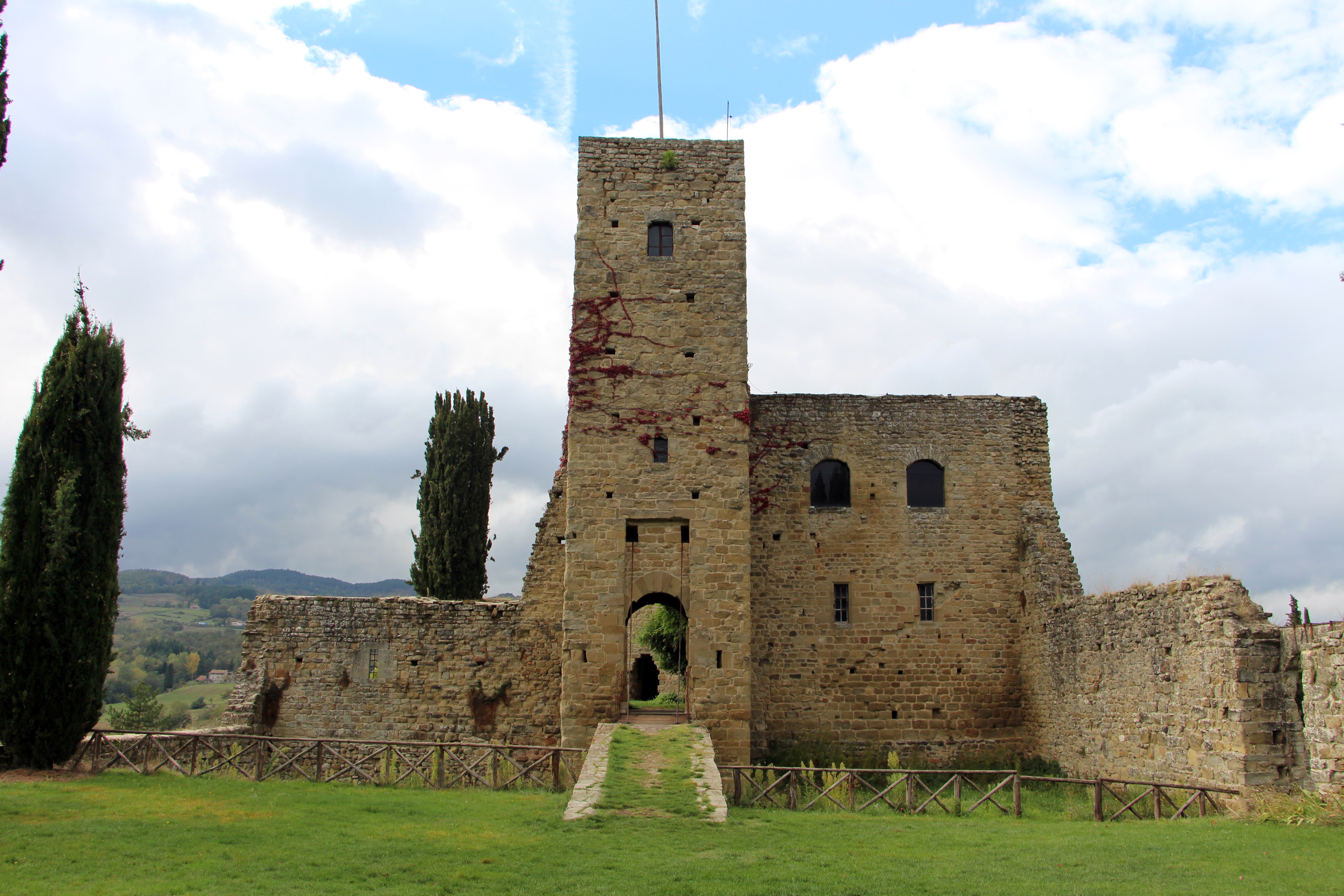
Castello di Romena, Pratovecchio

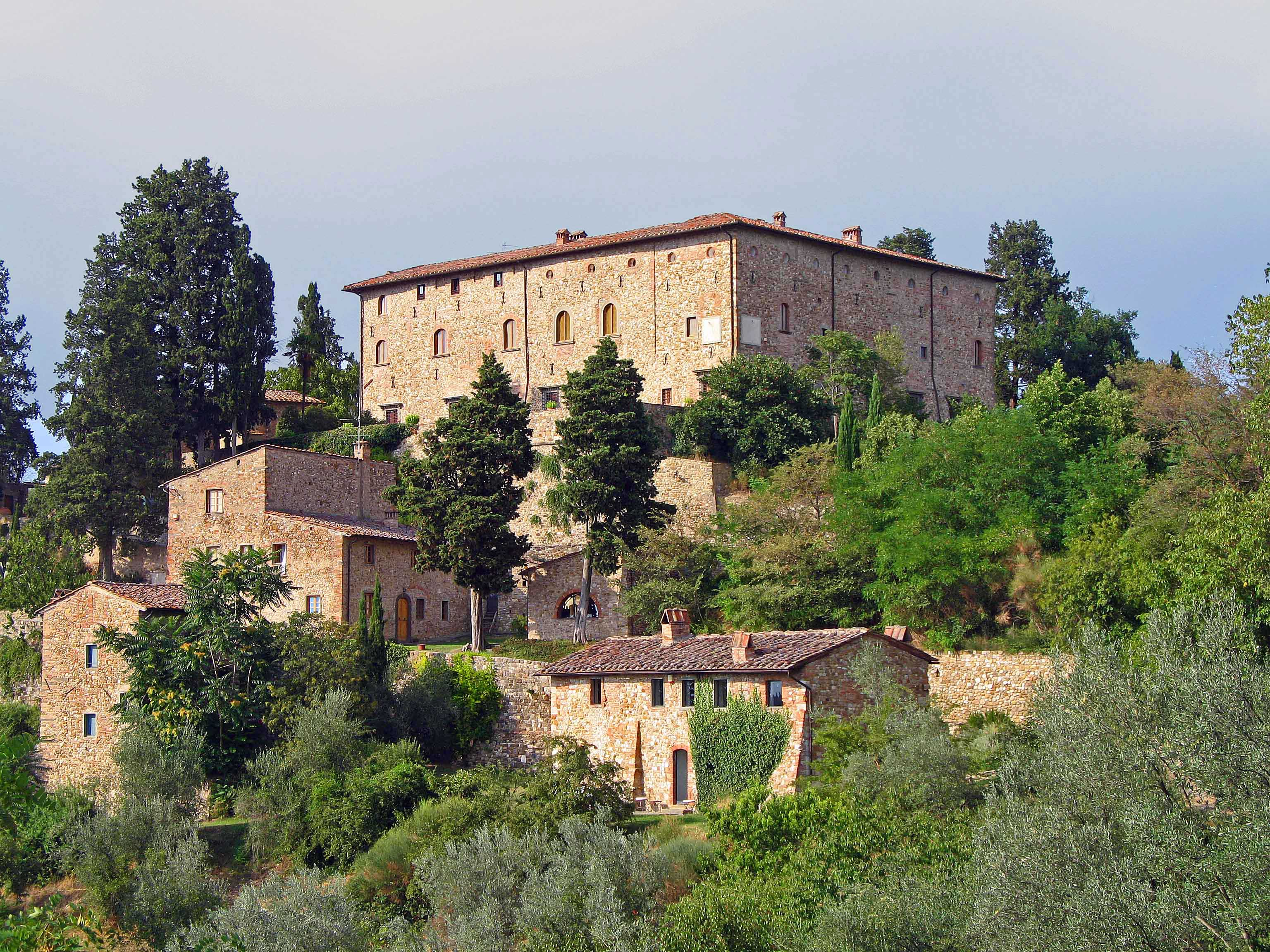
Castello di Bibbione, San Casciano in Val di Pesa

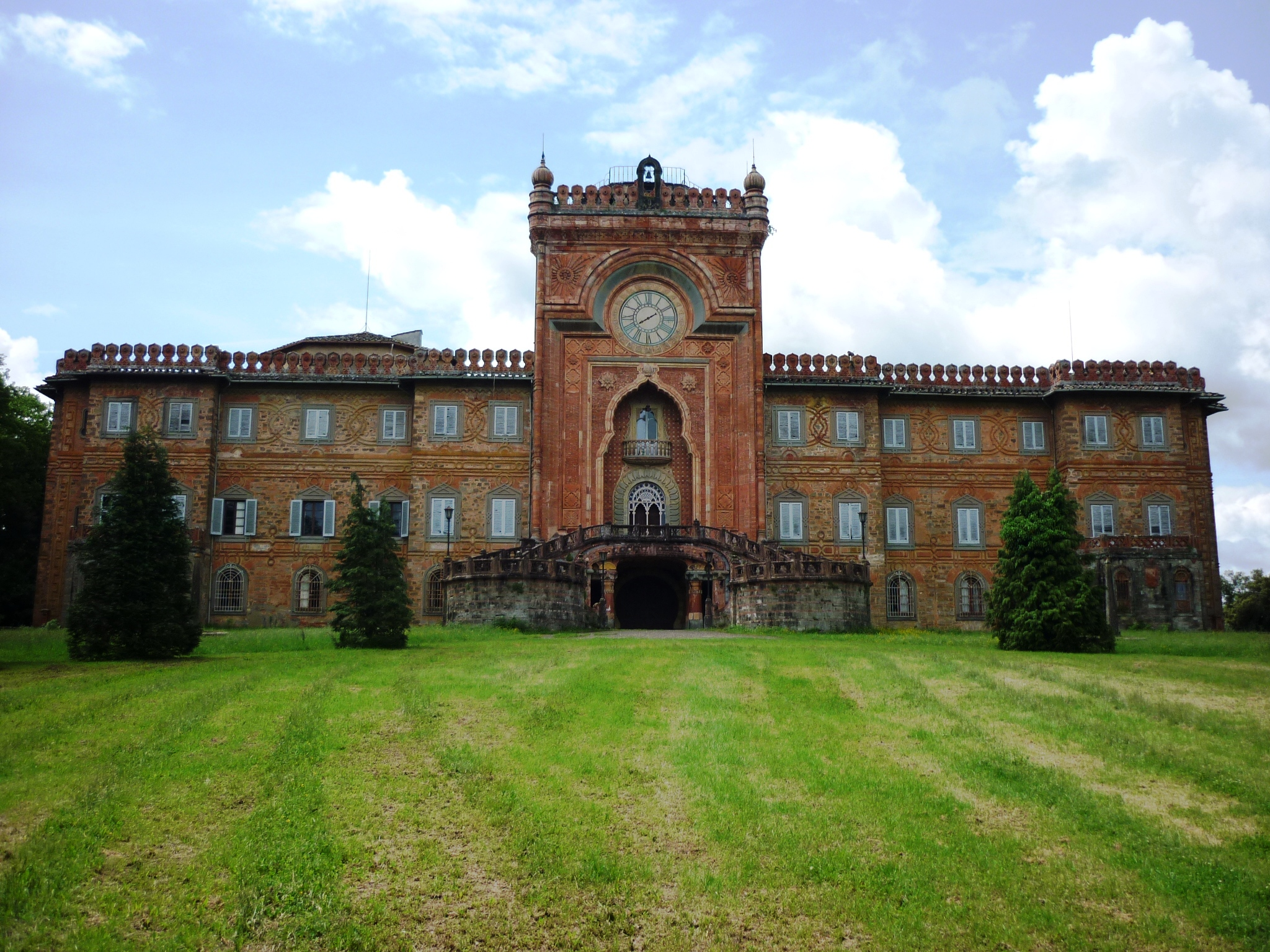
Castle of Sammezzano, Reggello

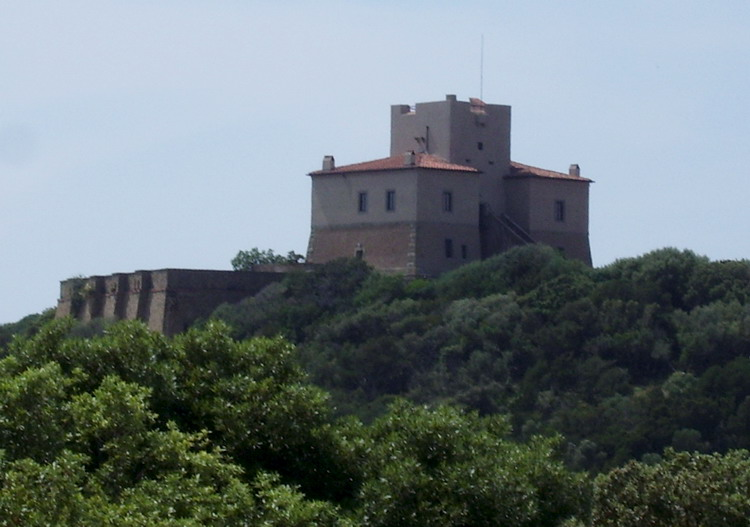
Castello di Punta Ala, Punta Ala

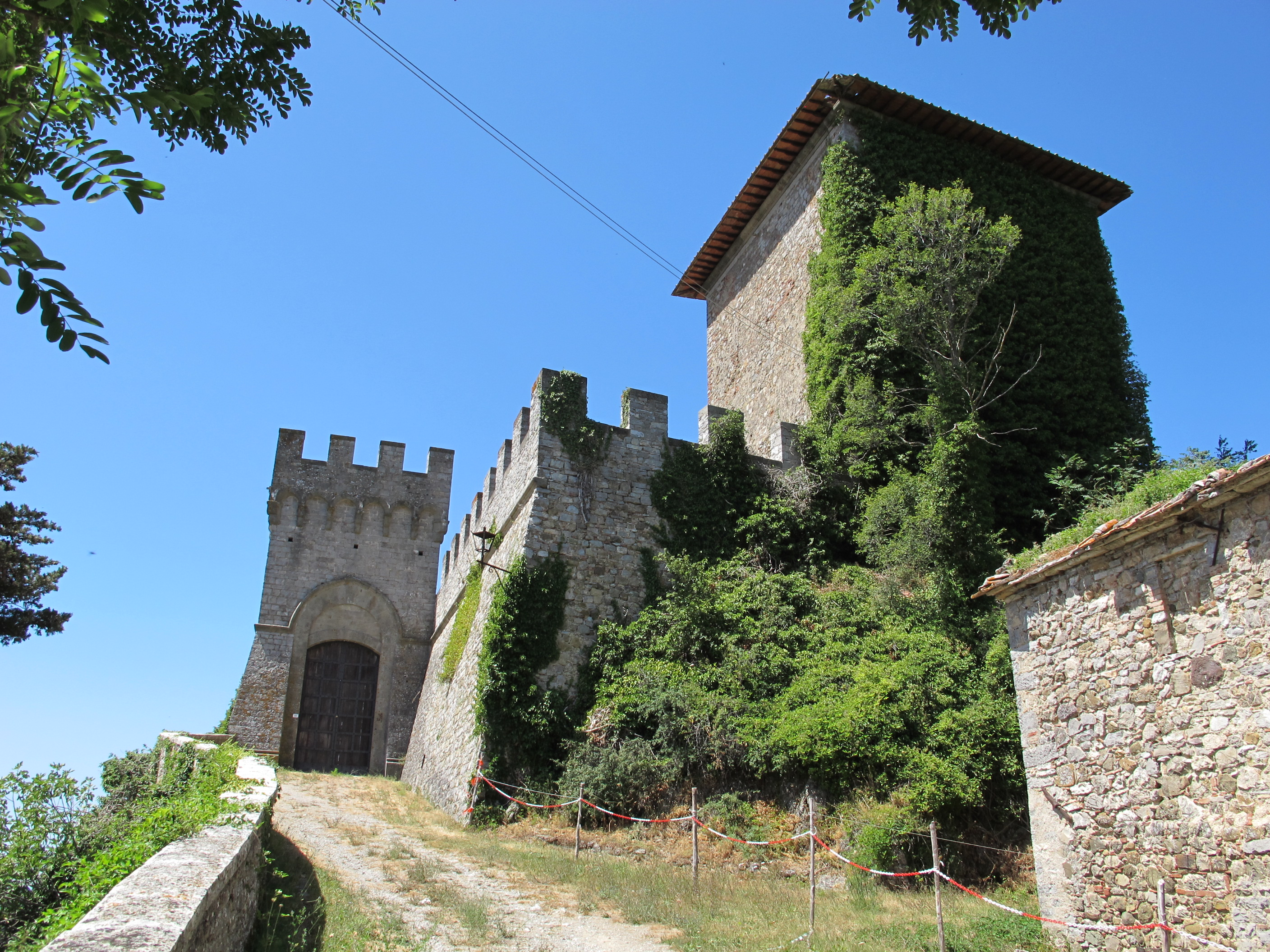
Castello di Triana, Roccalbegna

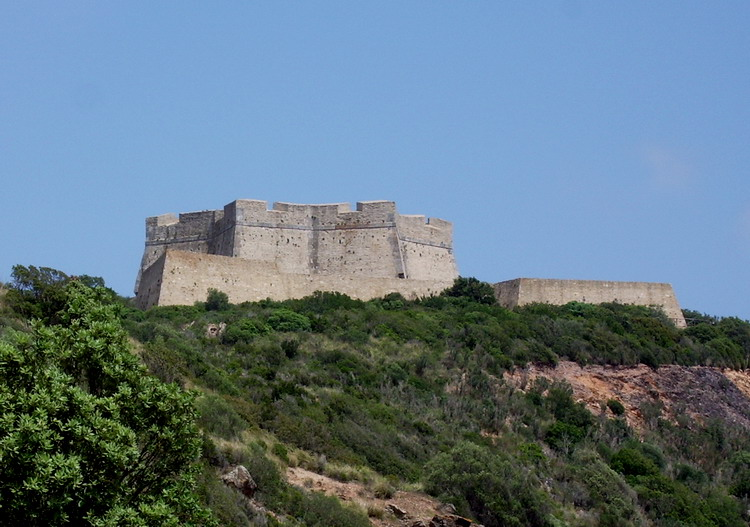
Forte Stella, Porto Ercole

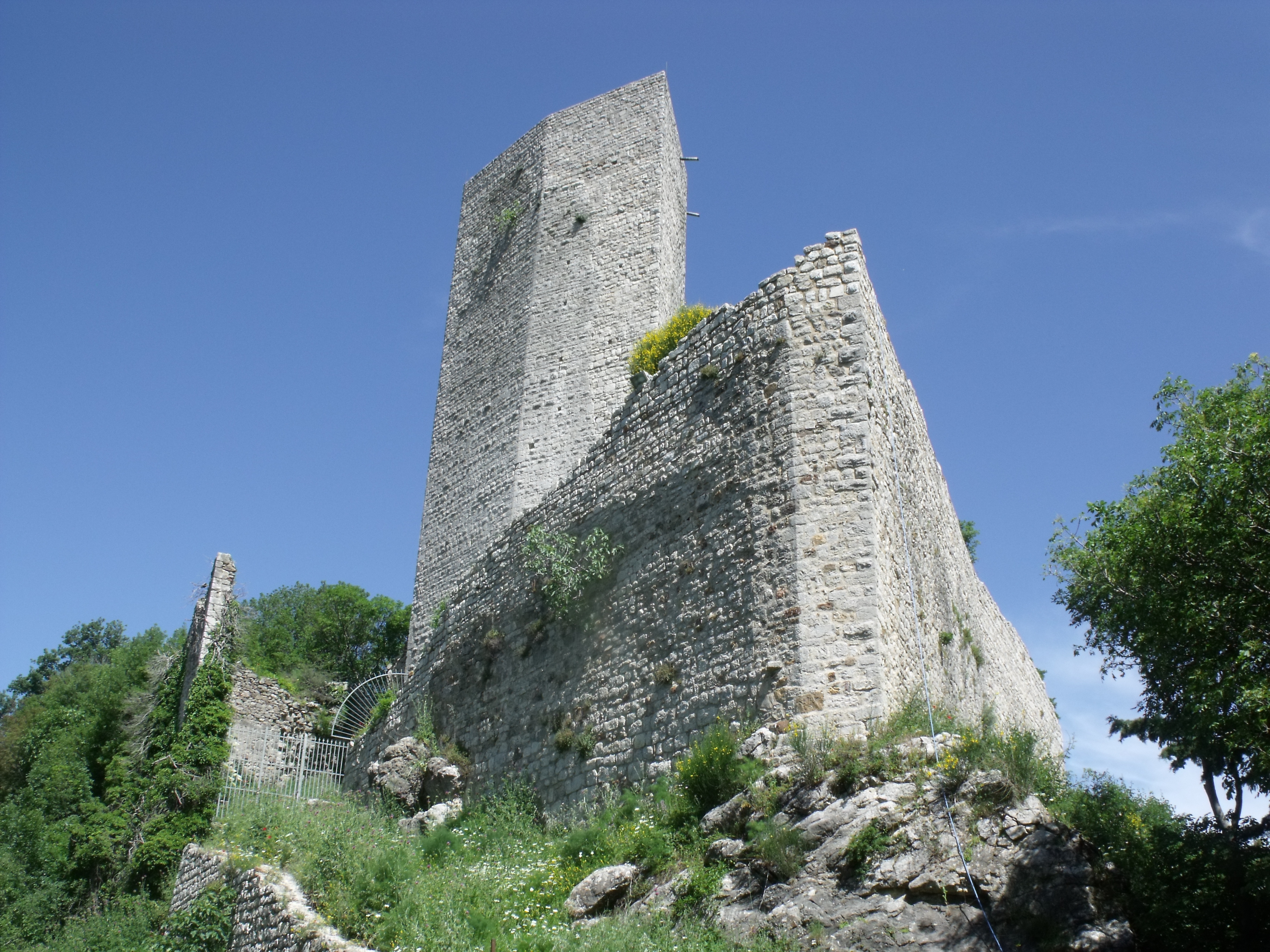
Rocca Silvana, Castell'Azzara

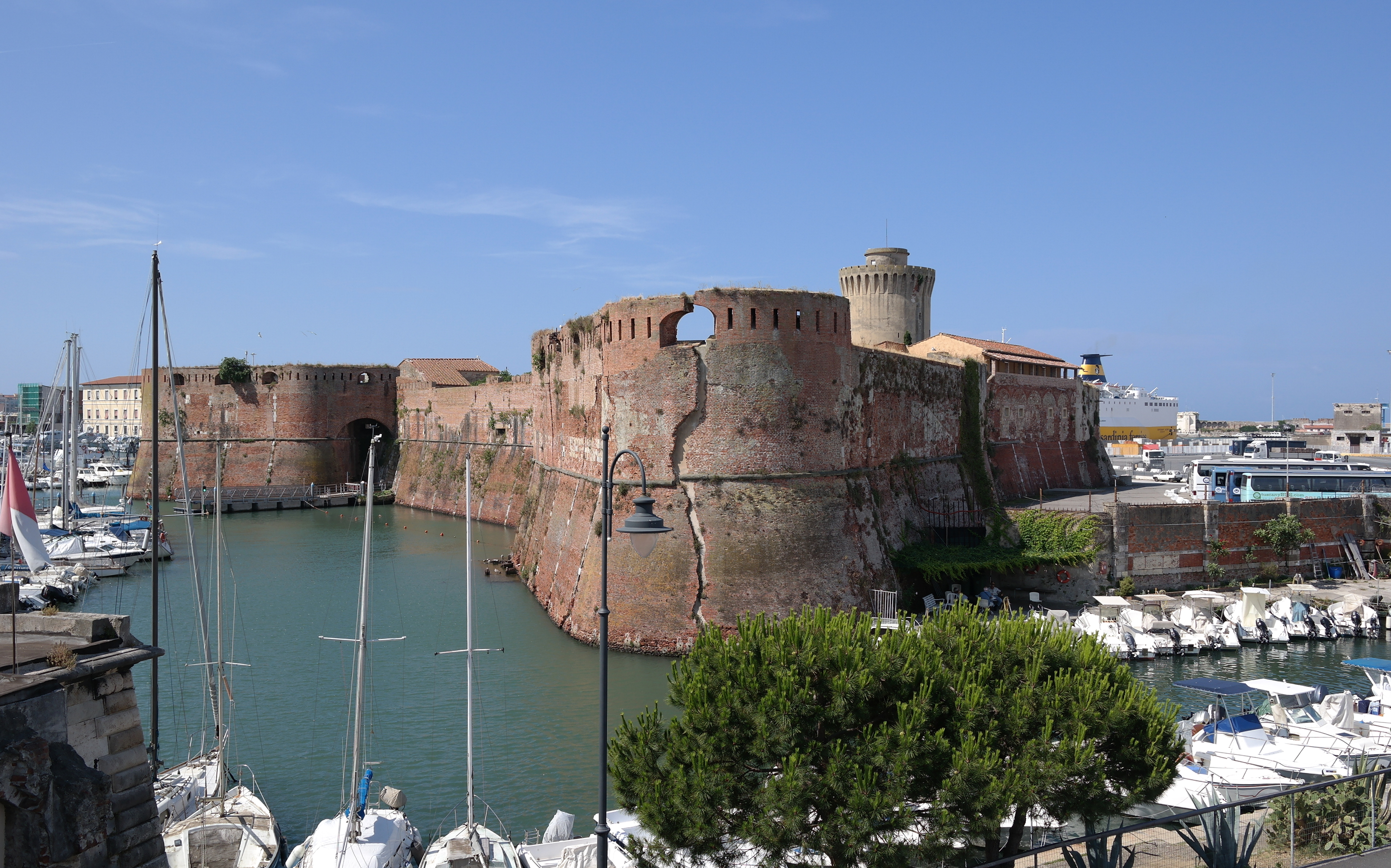
Old Fortress of Livorno, Livorno

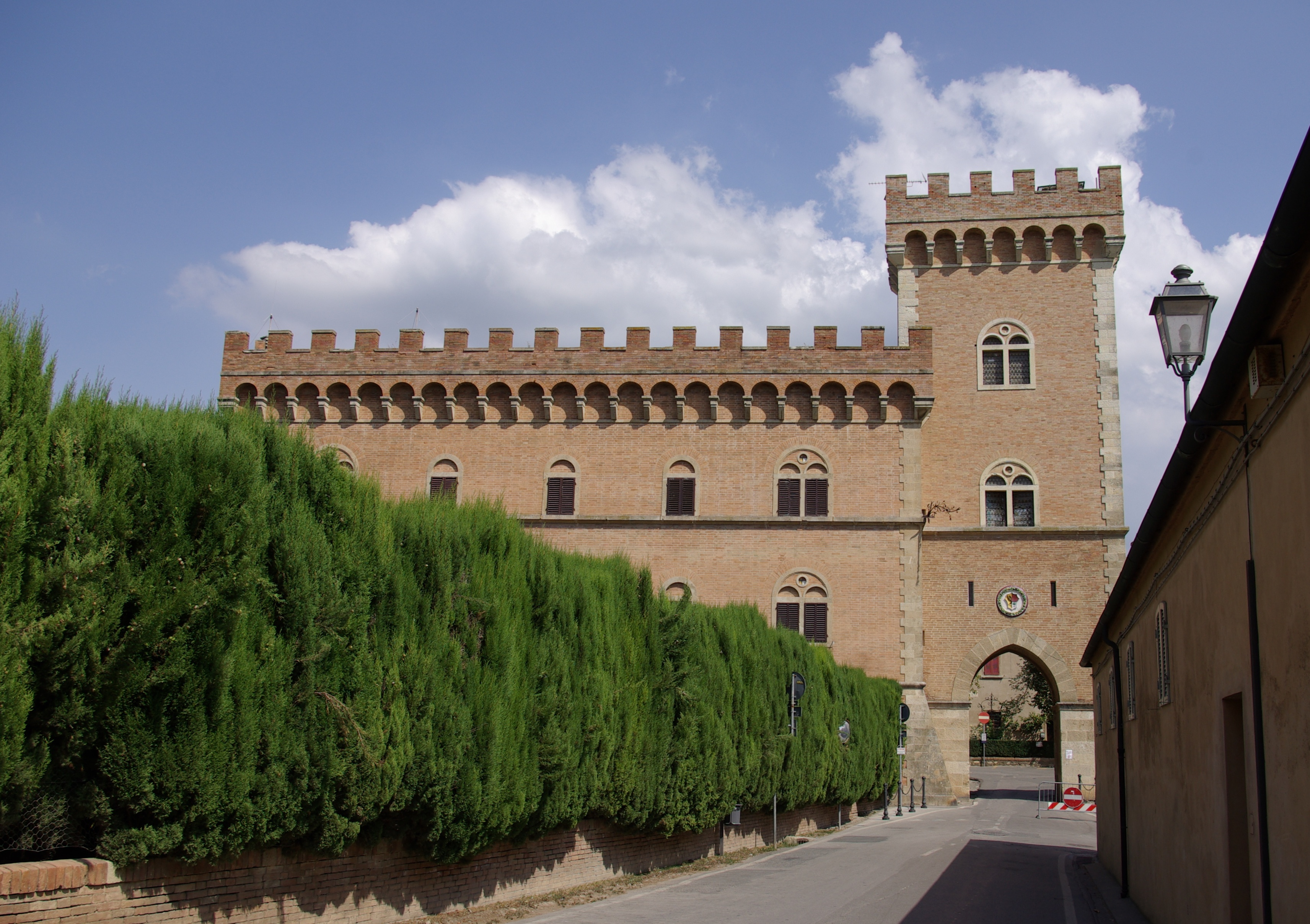
Gherardesca's Castle, Bolgheri

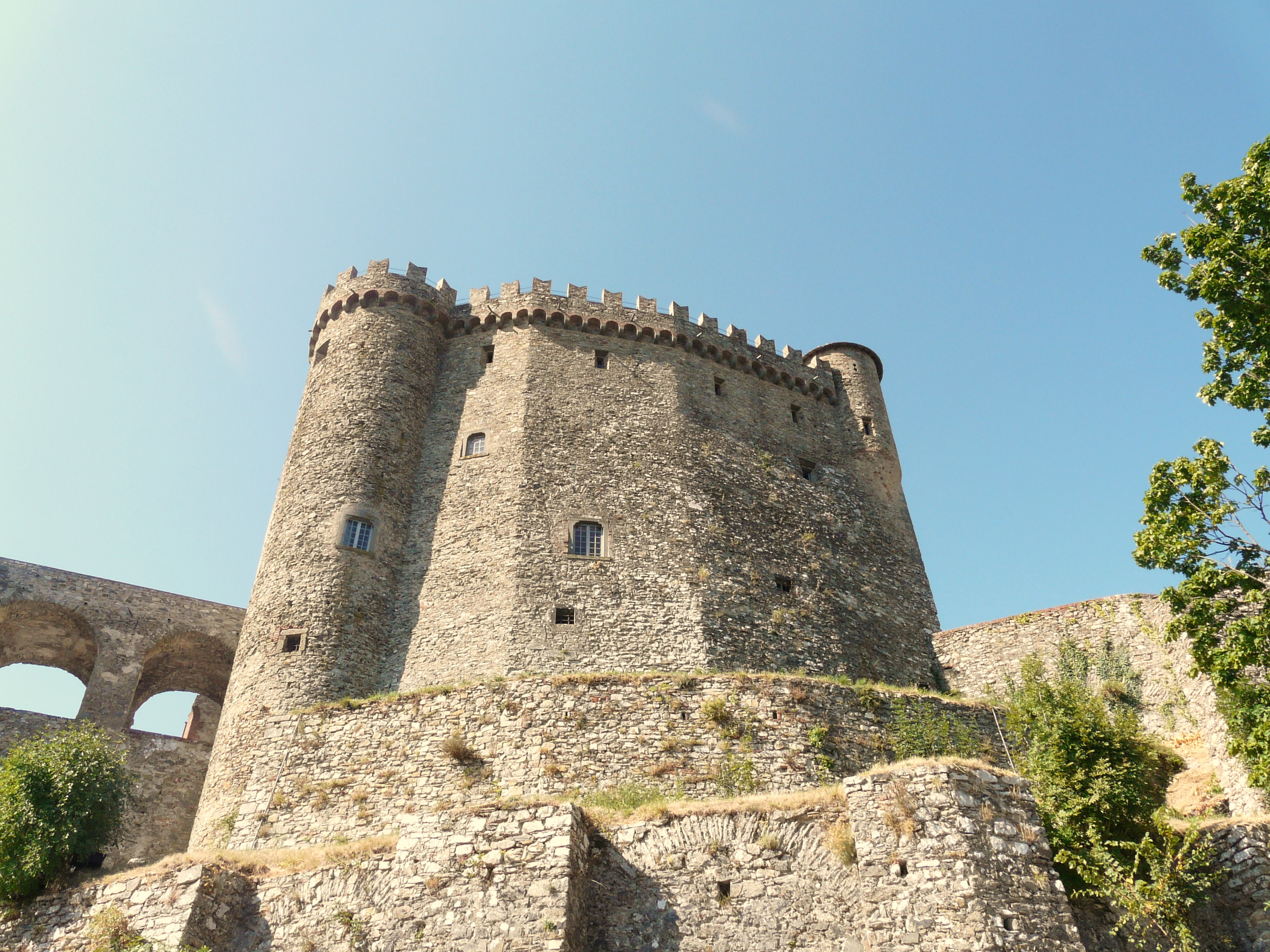
Castello Malaspina, Fosdinovo

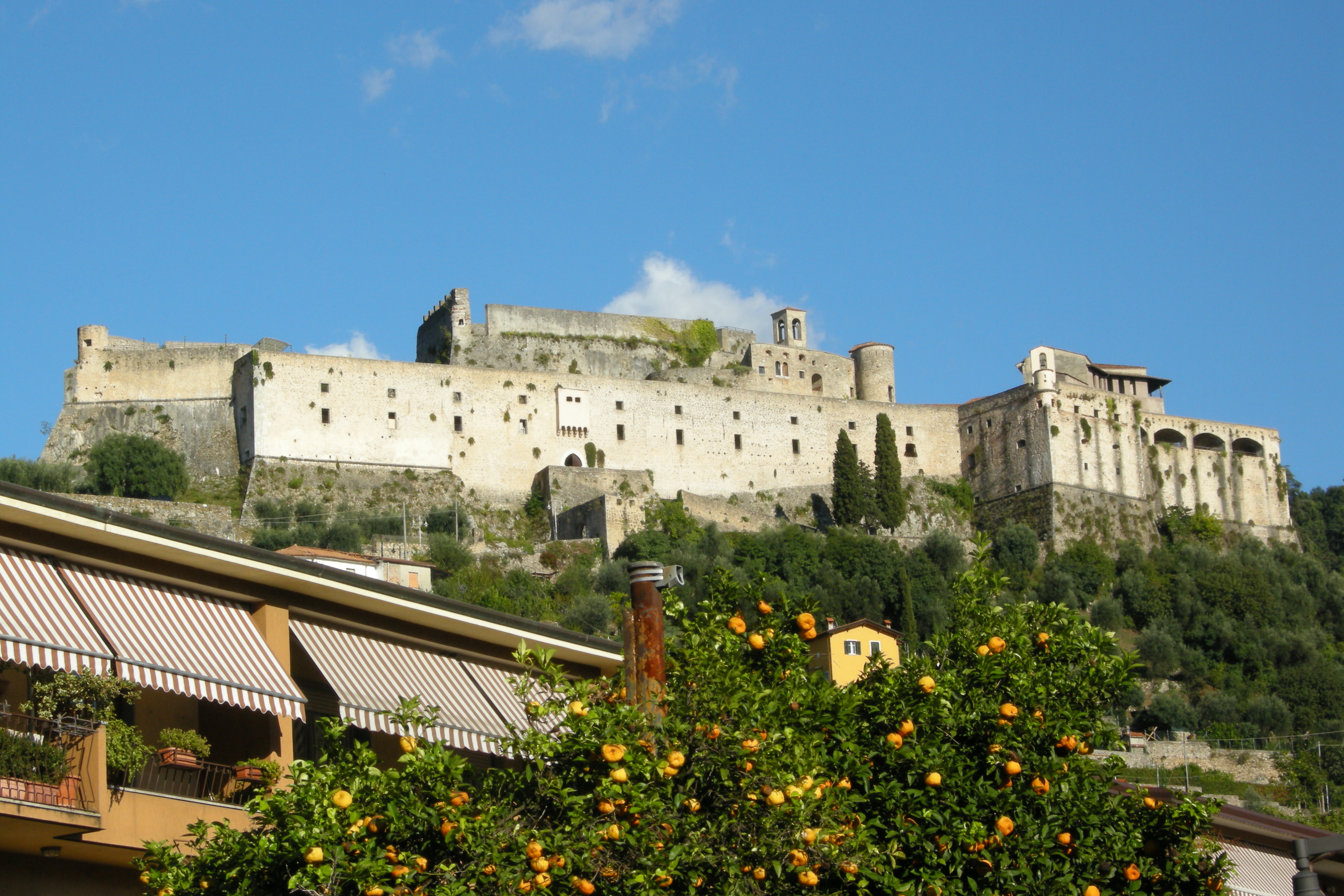
Rocca Malaspina, Massa

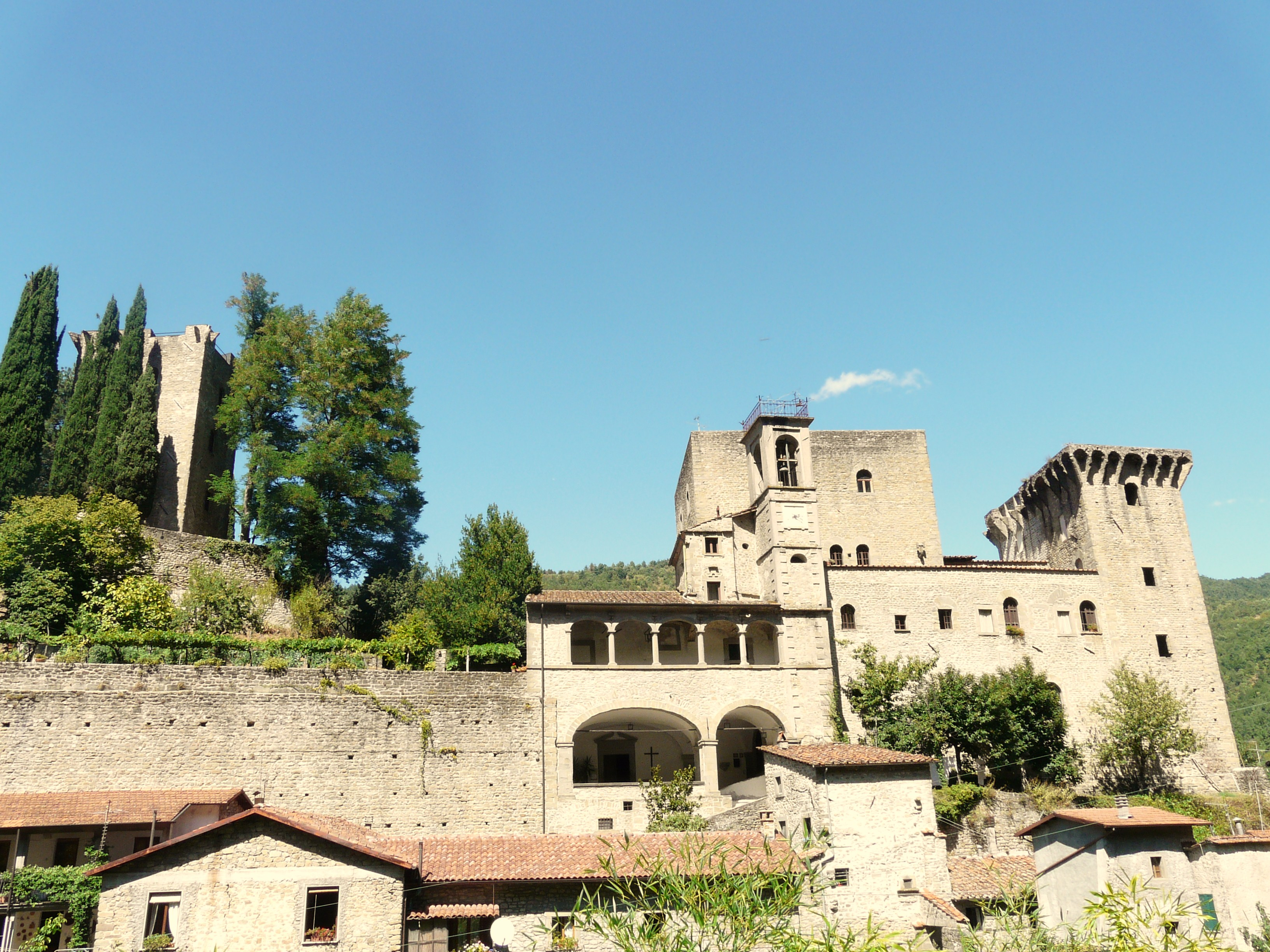
Fortezza della Verrucola, Fivizzano

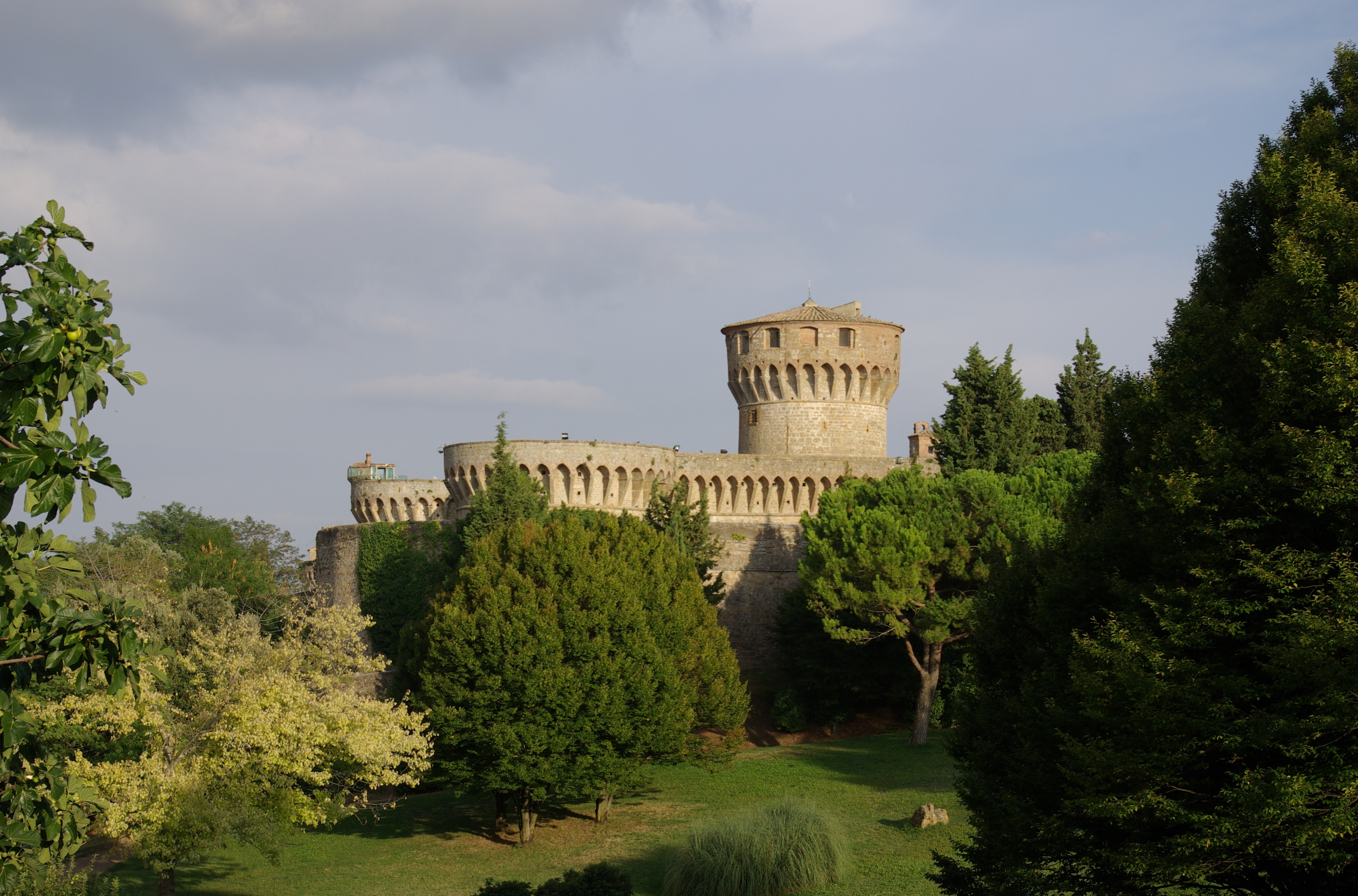
Medicean Fortress, Volterra

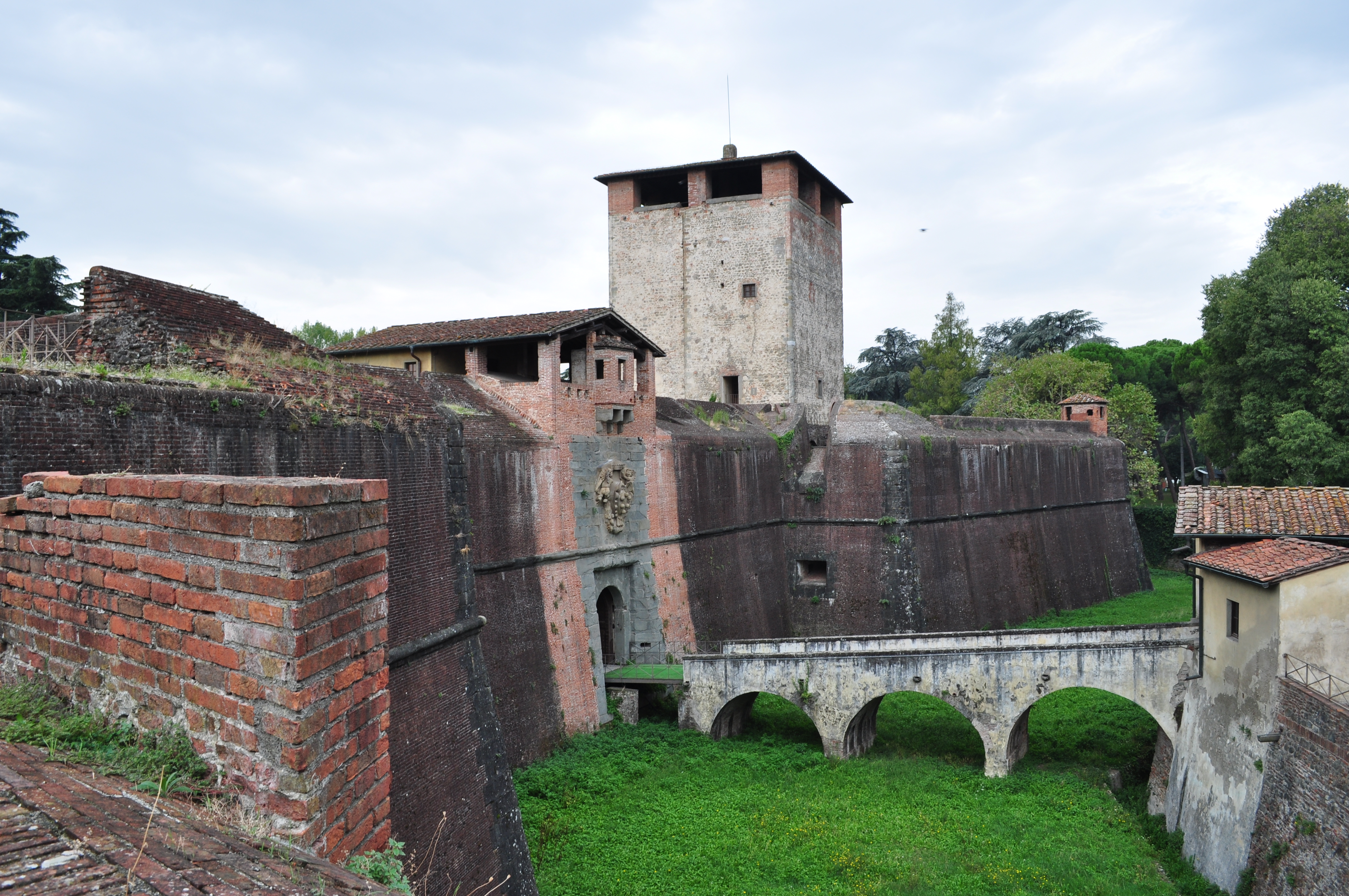
Fortezza Santa Barbara, Pistoia

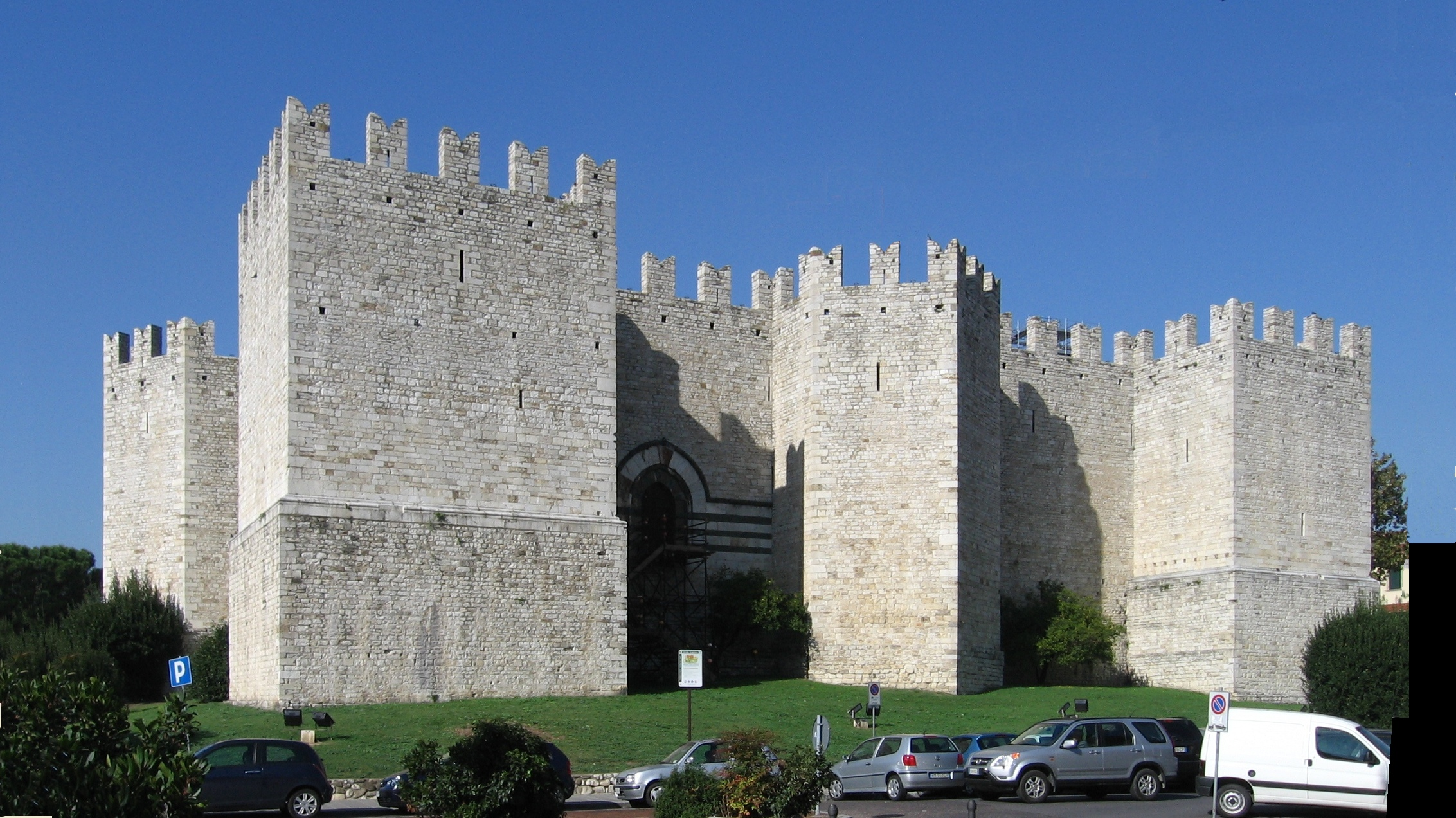
Castello dell'Imperatore, Prato

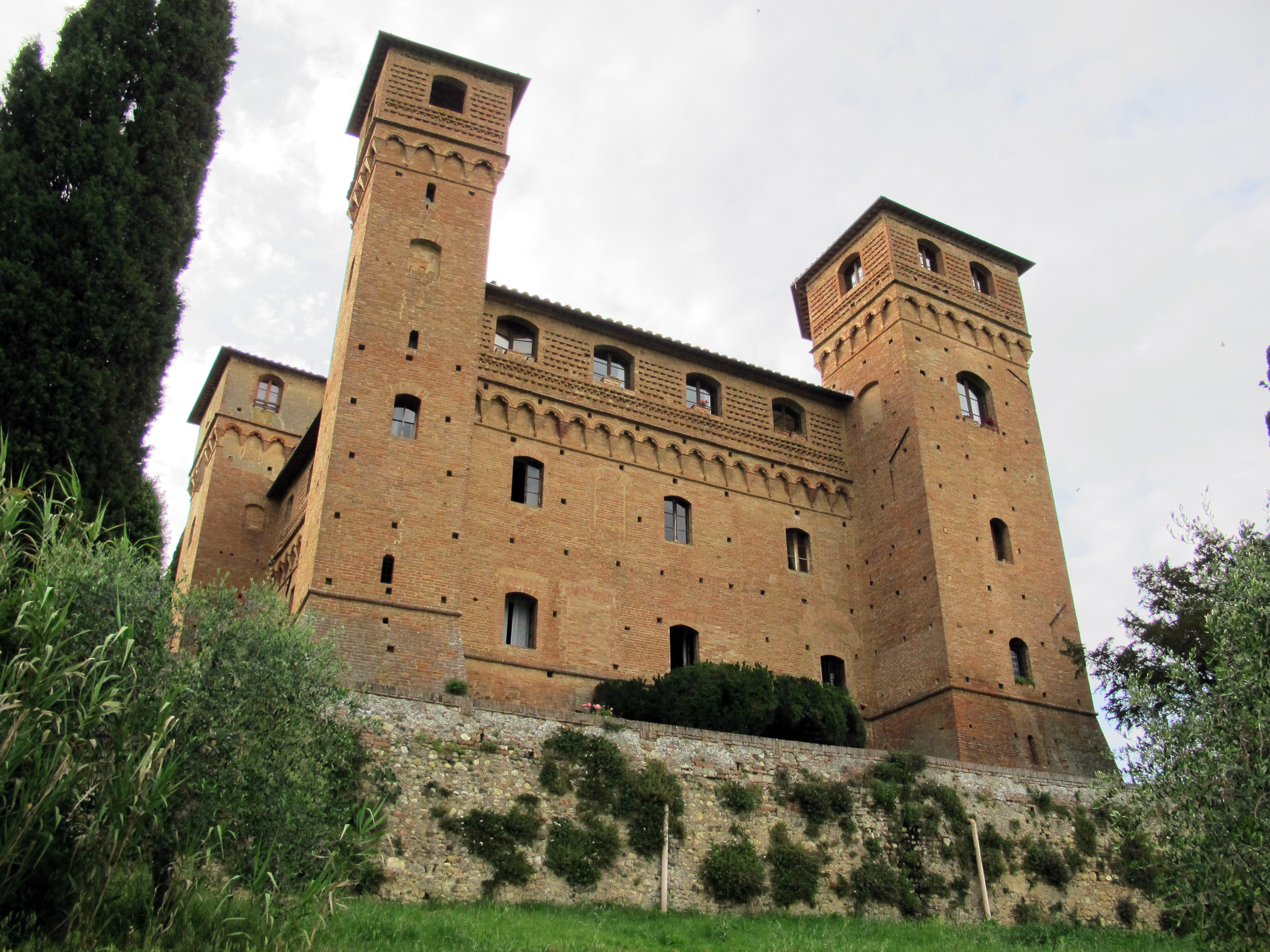
Castello delle Quattro Torra, Siena

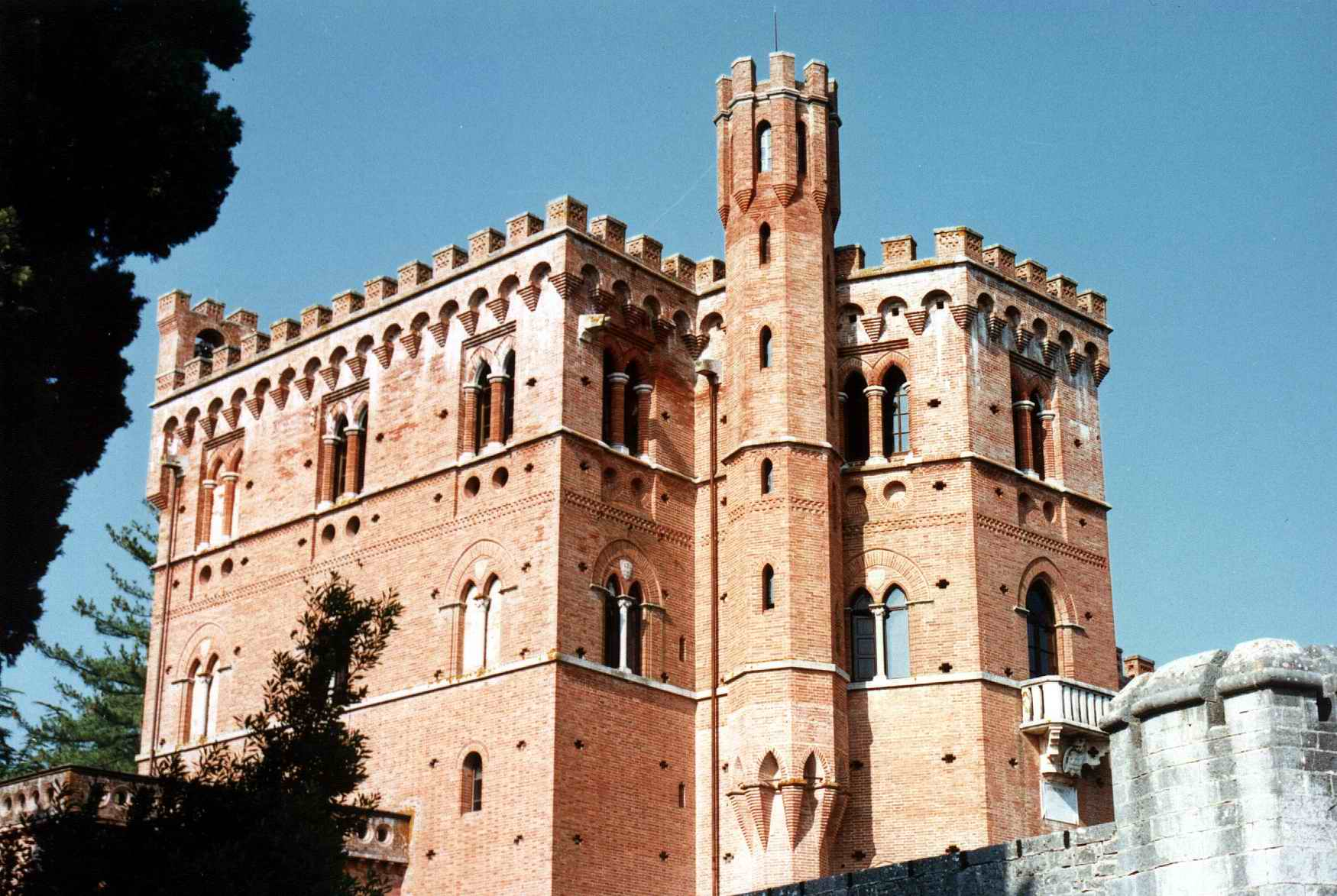
Castello di Brolio, Gaiole in Chianti

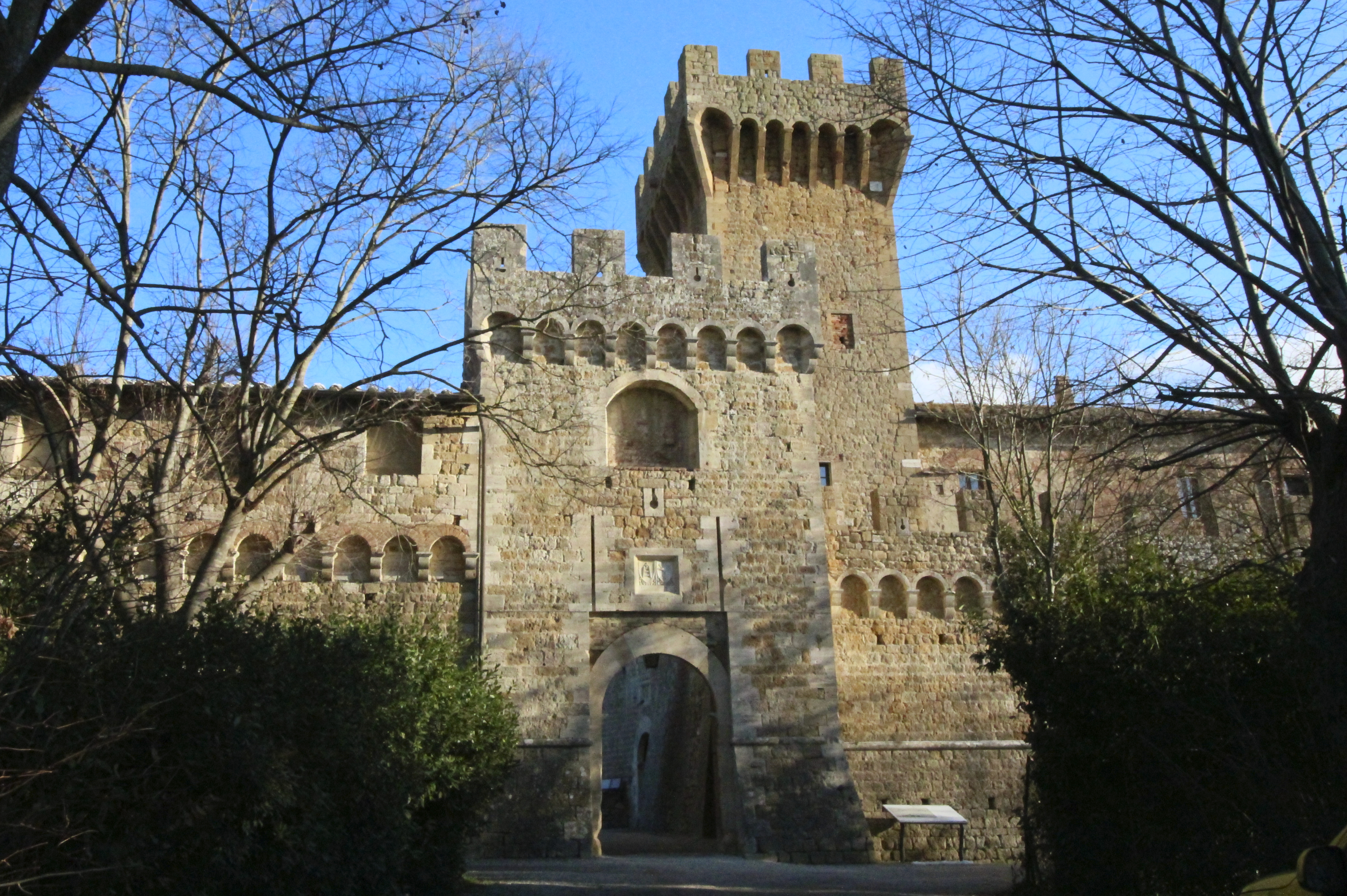
Castello di Spedaletto, Pienza

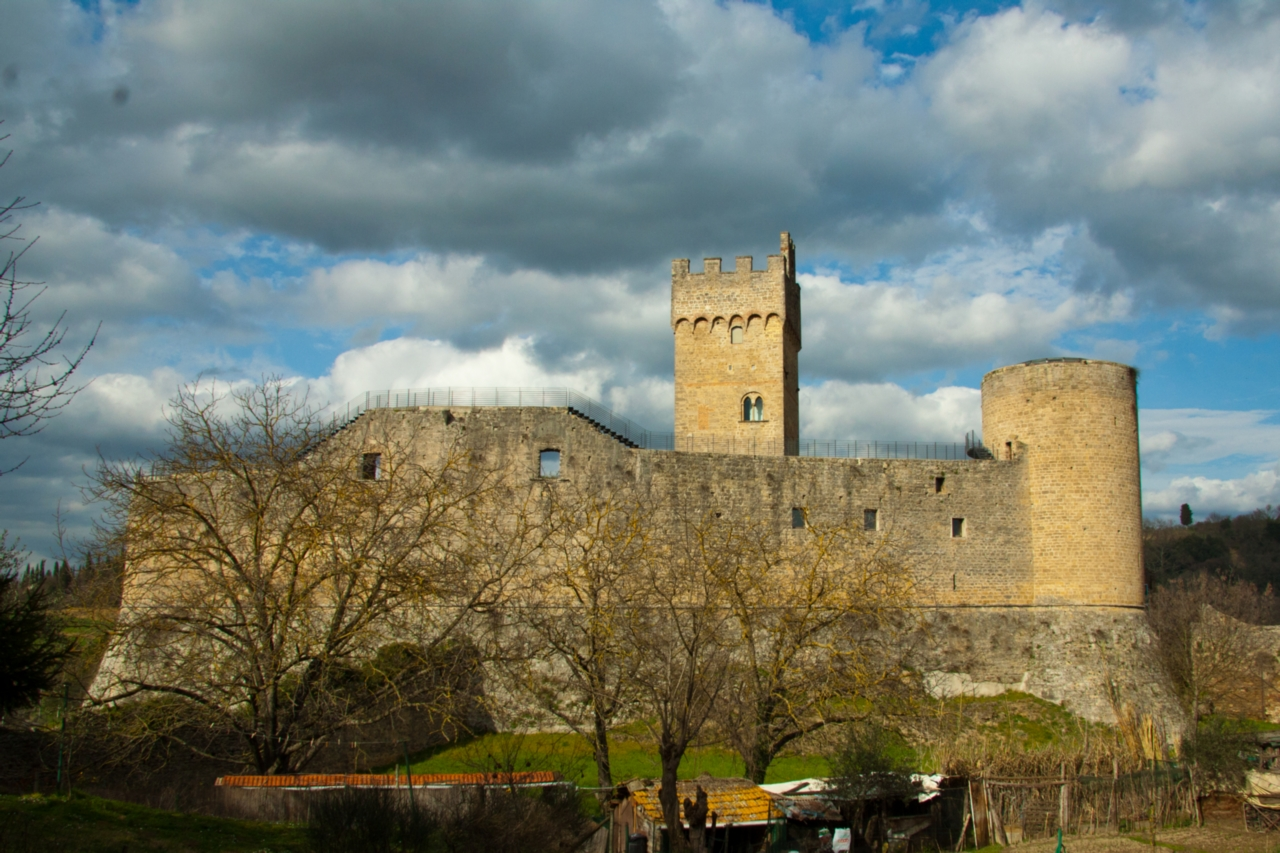
Castello di Staggia Senese, Poggibonsi

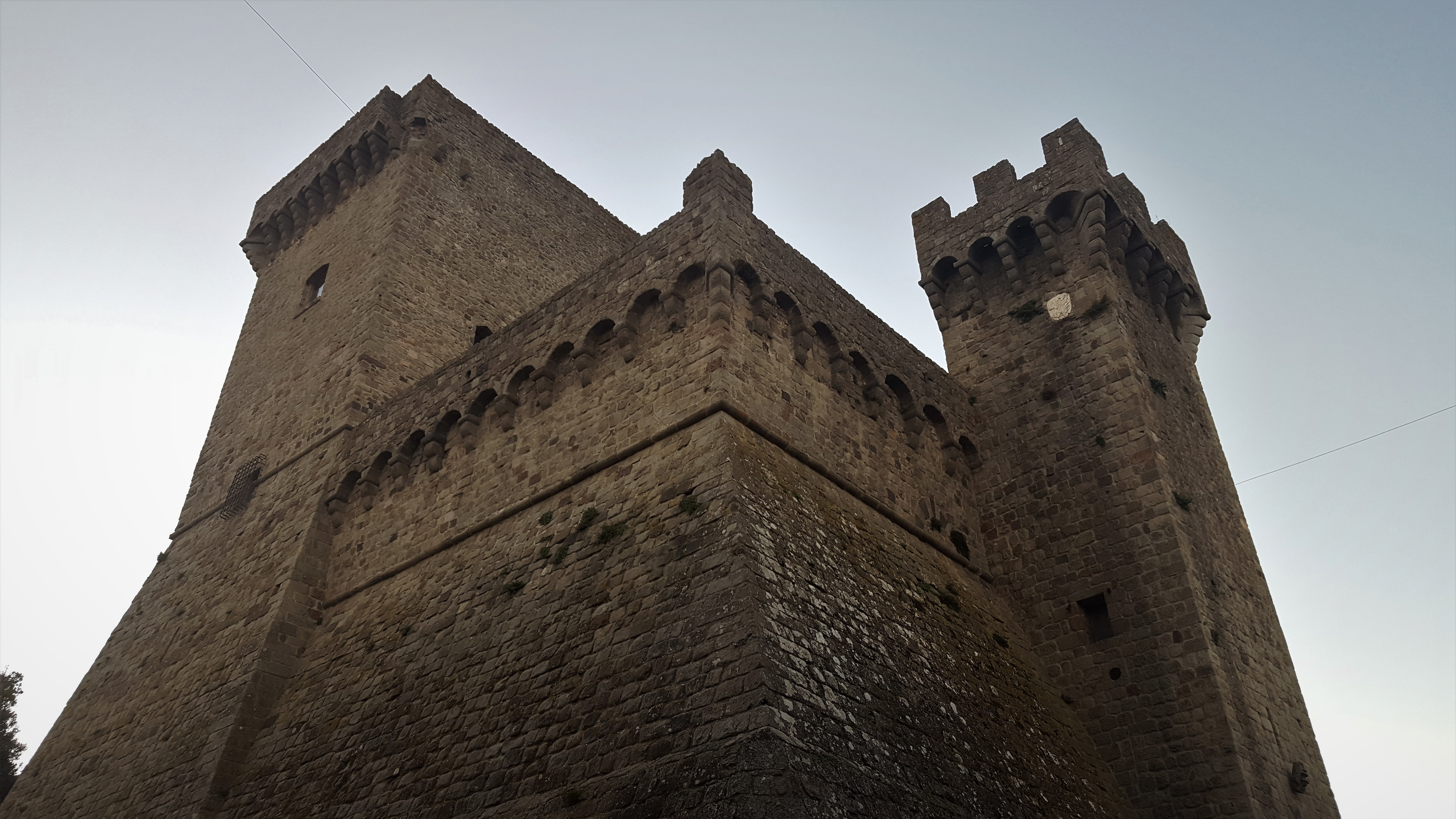
Rocca Aldobrandesca, Piancastagnaio

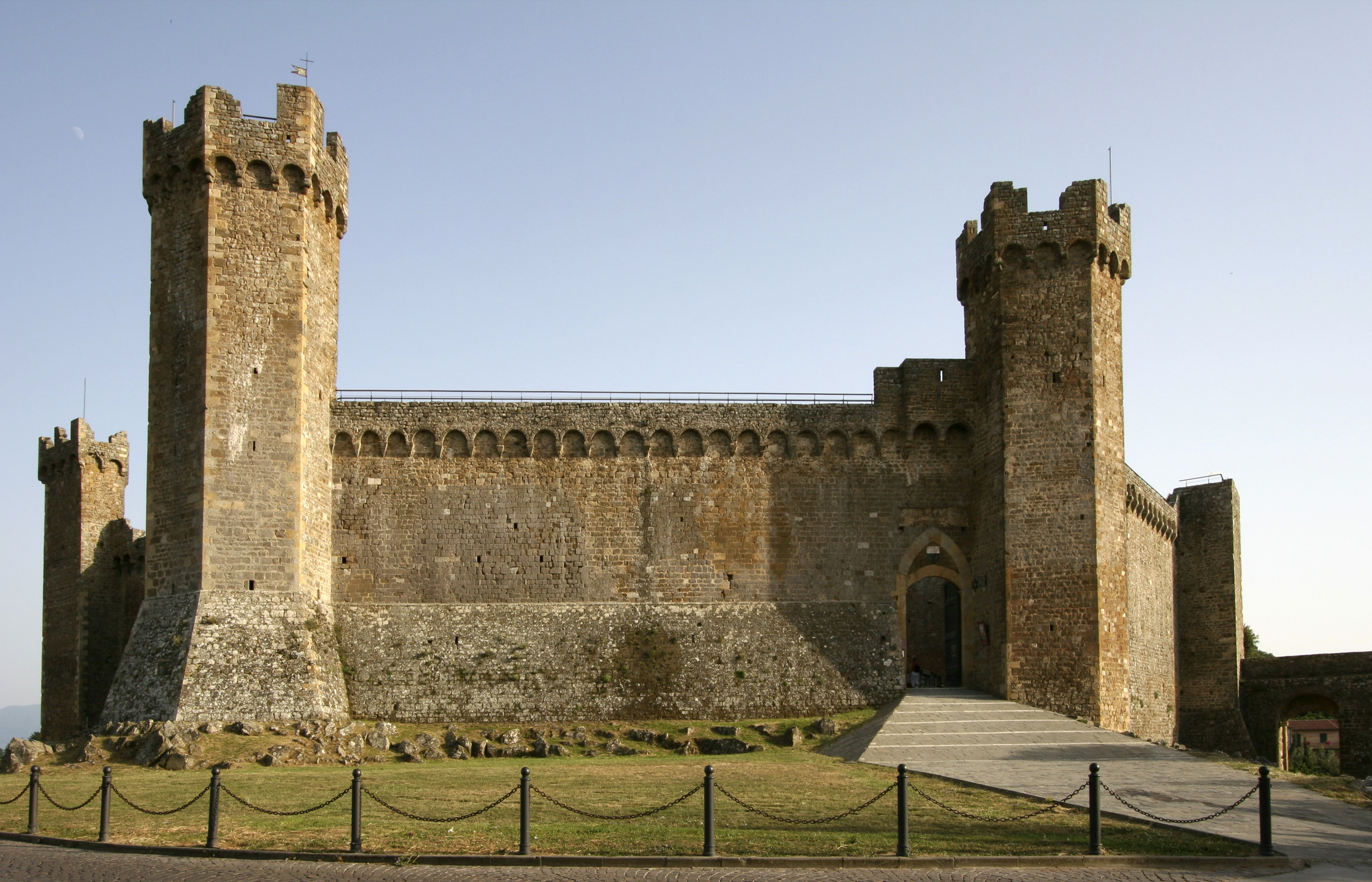
Rocca Montalcino, Montalcino

Province of Arezzo

- Castello di Belfiore, Capolona
- Castello di Capraia, Talla
- Castello di Caprese Michelangelo
- Castello Cattani, Chiusi della Verna
- Castello di Cennina, Bucine
- Castello dei Conti Guidi, Castel San Niccolò
- Castello dei Conti Guidi, Montemignaio
- Castello dei Conti Guidi, Poppi
- Castello di Faltona, Talla
- Castello di Fronzola, Poppi
- Castello di Gressa, Bibbiena
- Castello di Montauto, Anghiari
- Castello di Montebenichi, Bucine
- Castello di Montecchio Vesponi, Castiglion Fiorentino
- Castello di Porciano, Stia
- Castello di Pieve a Ranco, Arezzo
- Castello di Romena, Pratovecchio
- Castello di Rondini, Arezzo)
- Castelsecco, Arezzo
- Castello di Gargonza, Monte San Savino
- Castello di Pontenano, Talla
- Castello di Valenzano, Subbiano
- Castelnuovo di Subbiano
- Fortezza Medicea, Arezzo
- Rocca del Girifalco, Cortona
- Rocca di Pierle, Cortona

Province of Florence

- Belvedere, Florence
- Castello di Bibbione, San Casciano in Val di Pesa
- Castello di Castiglione, Sesto Fiorentino
- Castello di Legri, Calenzano
- Castello di Linari, Barberino Val d'Elsa
- Castle of Gabbiano, San Casciano in Val di Pesa
- Castello di Montauto, Impruneta
- Castello di Monte Cascioli, Lastra a Signa
- Castello di Montegufoni, Montespertoli
- Castello di Monte Orlando, Signa
- Castello il Palagio, Florence
- Castello della Paneretta, Barberino Val d'Elsa
- Torre del Pian dell'Isola, Rignano sull'Arno
- Castello di Poppiano, Montespertoli
- Castello di Quarate, Bagno a Ripoli
- Castle of Sammezzano, Reggello
- Castello di Sidney Sonnino, Montespertoli
- Castello di Signa, Signa
- Castello di Torregalli, Florence
- Castello di Volognano, Rignano sull'Arno

Province of Grosseto

- Cassero, Cinigiano
- Cassero, Istia d'Ombrone
- Cassero, Montelaterone
- Cassero, Montieri
- Cassero Senese, or Fortezza, Grosseto
- Cassero Senese, Roccalbegna
- Castel Diruto, Massa Marittima
- Castel di Pietra, Gavorrano
- Castel Litiano, Roccastrada
- Castello del Dotale, Campagnatico
- Castello del Potentino, Seggiano
- Castello delle Rocchette
- Castello di Batignano
- Castello di Boccheggiano
- Castello di Casallia, Vetulonia
- Castello di Castiglion Bernardi, Monterotondo Marittimo
- Castello di Castiglione della Pescaia
- Castello di Catabbio
- Castello di Cotone, Scansano
- Castello di Cugnano, Monterotondo Marittimo
- Castello di Gerfalco
- Castello di Giuncarico
- Castello di Montemassi
- Castello di Montemerano
- Castello di Lattaia, Roccastrada
- Castello di Magliano in Toscana
- Castello di Marsiliana d'Albegna
- Castello di Marsiliana, Massa Marittima
- Castello di Monte Antico
- Castello di Montebuono
- Castello di Montepescali
- Castello di Montepò, Scansano
- Castello di Monterotondo Marittimo
- Castello di Montiano
- Castello di Monticello Amiata
- Castello di Montorio
- Castello di Montorgiali
- Castello di Montorsaio
- Castello di Penna, Castell'Azzara
- Castello di Pereta
- Castello di Perolla, Massa Marittima
- Castello di Porrona
- Castello di Prata
- Castello di Punta Ala
- Castello di Ravi
- Castello di Sassoforte, Sassofortino
- Castello di Scerpena, Magliano in Toscana
- Castello di Seggiano
- Castello di Stachilagi, Magliano in Toscana
- Castello di Stertignano, Campagnatico
- Castello di Tatti
- Castello di Torniella
- Castello di Travale
- Castello di Triana
- Castello di Tricosto, Capalbio
- Castello di Valle, Follonica
- Castello di Vetulonia
- Castello di Vicarello, Cinigiano
- Castello di Vitozza, San Quirico
- Castiglion del Torto, Castiglioncello Bandini
- Forte delle Saline, Albinia
- Forte Filippo, Porto Ercole
- Forte Santa Caterina, Porto Ercole
- Forte Stella, Porto Ercole
- Fortezza Spagnola, Porto Santo Stefano
- Palazzo Orsini, Pitigliano
- Palazzo Orsini, Sorano
- Palazzo Sforza Cesarini, Santa Fiora
- Rocca Aldobrandesca, Arcidosso
- Rocca Aldobrandesca, Buriano
- Rocca Aldobrandesca, Campagnatico
- Rocca Aldobrandesca, Cana
- Rocca Aldobrandesca, Capalbio
- Rocca Aldobrandesca, Castell'Azzara
- Rocca Aldobrandesca, Giglio Castello
- Rocca Aldobrandesca, Manciano
- Rocca Aldobrandesca, Porto Ercole
- Rocca Aldobrandesca, Roccalbegna
- Rocca Aldobrandesca, Rocchette di Fazio
- Rocca Aldobrandesca, Saturnia
- Rocca Aldobrandesca, Scarlino
- Rocca Aldobrandesca, Semproniano
- Rocca Aldobrandesca, Sovana
- Rocca Aldobrandesca, Talamone
- Rocca degli Ottieri, Castell'Ottieri
- Rocca di Fregiano, San Valentino
- Rocca di Montauto, Manciano
- Rocca di Montevitozzo
- Rocca di Roccastrada
- Rocca di Roccatederighi
- Rocca Silvana, Selvena
- Rocchette Pannocchieschi, Massa Marittima

Province of Livorno

- Old Fortress, Livorno
- Fortezza Nuova, Livorno
- Romito Castle, Romito
- Gherardesca’s Castle, Bolgheri
- Fortress of Populonia, Populonia
- Cassero Pisano, Piombino

Province of Lucca

- Rocca di Trassilico, Gallicano
- Verrucole Castle, San Romano in Garfagnana
- Gorfigliano Castle, Gorfigliano Vecchio
- Montalfonso Fortress, Castelnuovo di Garfagnana
- Castiglione Castle and “Rocca”, Castiglione di Garfagnana
- Ceserana Castle, Fosciandora
- Montepigoli Castle, Montepigoli
- Castelvecchio Castle and “Dongione”, Piazza al Serchio
- Este Fortress, Cascio
- Sassi Ruines, Sassi
- Roccalberti Ruines, Casatico
- Molazzana Castle, Molazzana
- Nozzano Castle and "Rocca", Nozzano
- Bargiglio Tower, Bagni di Lucca
- Pietrasanta Fortress and "Rocca di Sala", Pietrasanta
- Bozzano Castle, Bozzano
- Porcaresi Castle, Villa Basilica
- Matilde Tower, Viareggio
- Fort, Forte dei Marmi

Province of Massa and Carrara

- Rocca Malaspina, Massa
- Castello Malaspina, Fosdinovo
- Fortezza della Verrucola, Fivizzano

Province of Pisa

- Medicean Fortress, Volterra
- Silla’s Fortress, Pietracassia
- Santa Maria Castle, Vecchiano
- Castellare Fortress, Asciano
- Verruca Fortress, Calci
- Sancasciani Castle, Ripoli
- Frederick II Castle, San Miniato al Tedesco
- Montecastelli Fortress, Montecastelli
- Gambacorti’s Castle, Filettole
- Roncioni’s Castle, Ripafratta

Province of Pistoia

- Santa Barbara Fortress, Pistoia, Pistoia

Province of Prato

- Castello dell'Imperatore, Prato

Province of Siena

- Castello della Magione, Poggibonsi
- Castello delle Quattro Torra, Siena
- Castello di Belcaro, Siena
- Castello di Brolio, Gaiole in Chianti
- Castello di Meleto, Gaiole in Chianti, Siena
- Castello Monteriggioni, Monteriggioni
- Castello di Spedaletto, Pienza
- Castello di Staggia Senese, Poggibonsi
- Fortress of Poggio Imperiale, Poggibonsi
- Rocca Aldobrandesca di Piancastagnaio, Piancastagnaio
- Rocca Montalcino, Montalcino

== Umbria ==
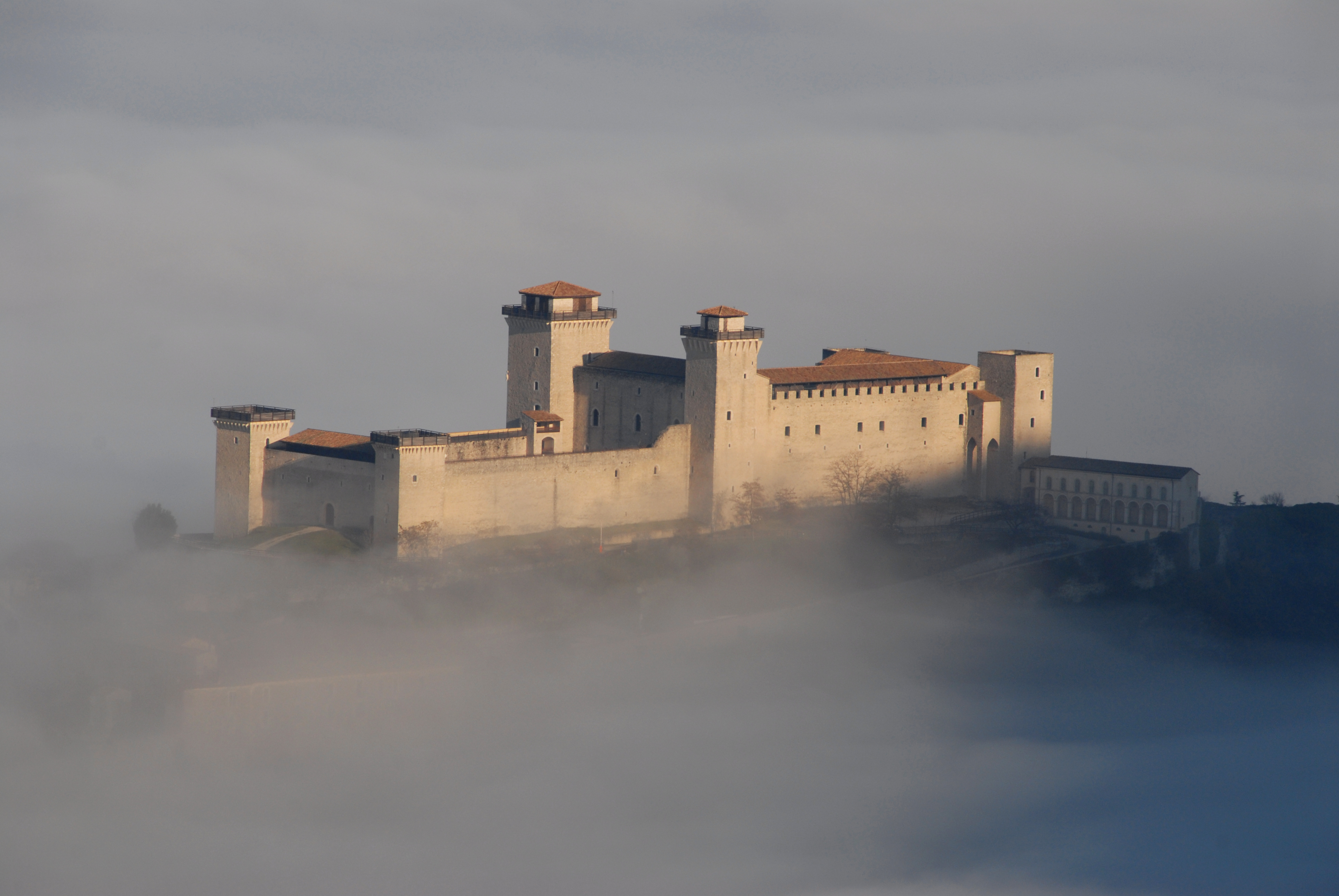
Rocca Albornoziana, Spoleto

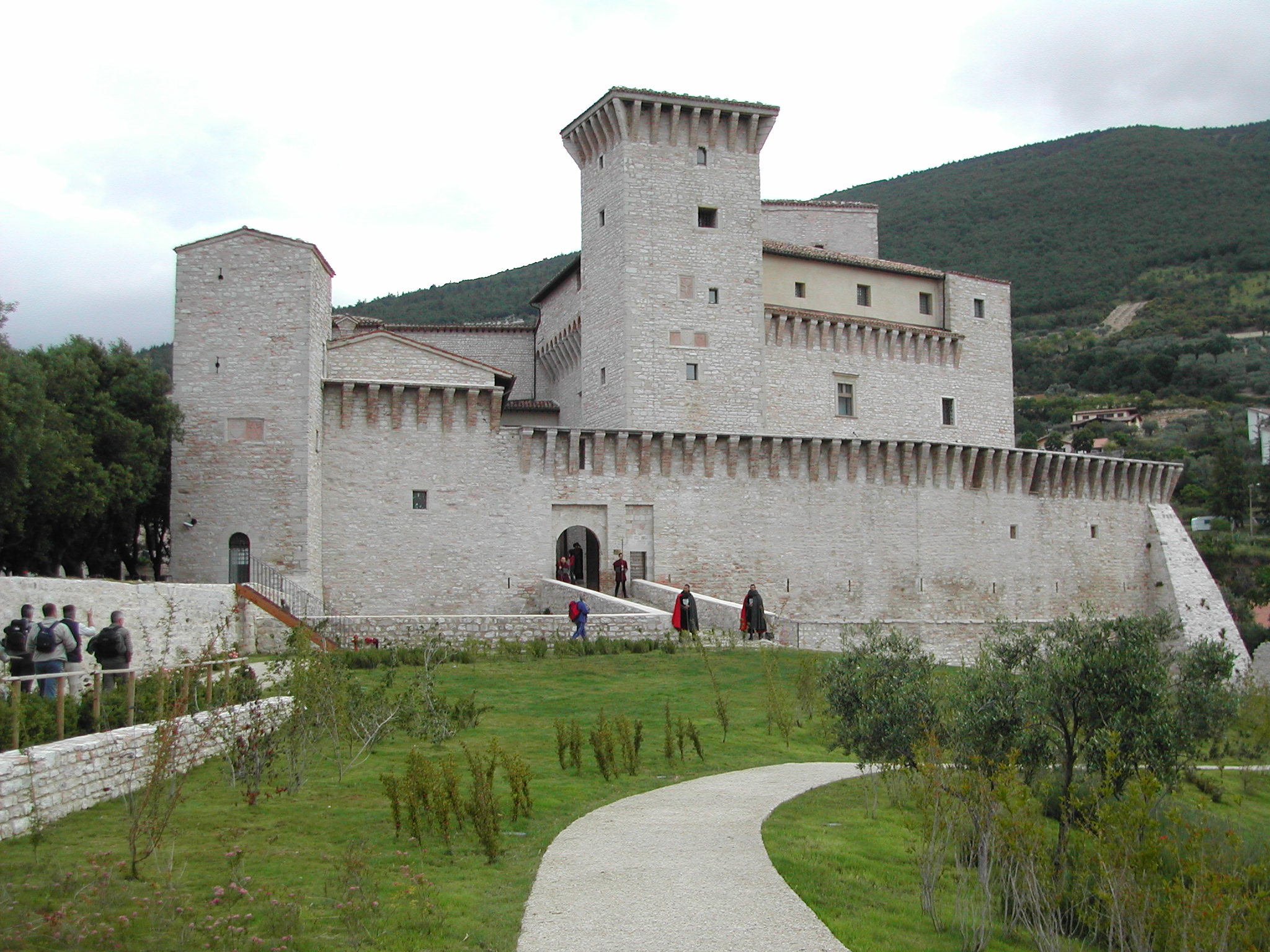
Rocca Flea, Gualdo Tadino

- Rocca Maggiore, Assisi
- Castelbuono di Bevagna, Bevagna
- Castello del Leone, Castiglione del Lago
- Castello di Montalera, Panicale
- Castello di Murlo, Murlo
- Castello di Petroia, Gubbio
- Castello di Reschio, Lisciano Niccone
- Castello di Procoio, Perugia
- Rocca Albornoziana, Narni
- The Castellina, Norcia
- Fortezza dell'Albornoz, Orvieto
- Rocca di Sberna, Orvieto
- Rocca Flea, Gualdo Tadino
- Rocca Ripesena, Orvieto
- Rocca Paolina, Perugia
- Rocca Albornoziana, Spoleto
- Rocchetta di Cesi, Cesi
- Castello di Monterone, Perugia
- Todi Castle, Todi
- Castello di Montegiove, Orvieto

== Veneto ==
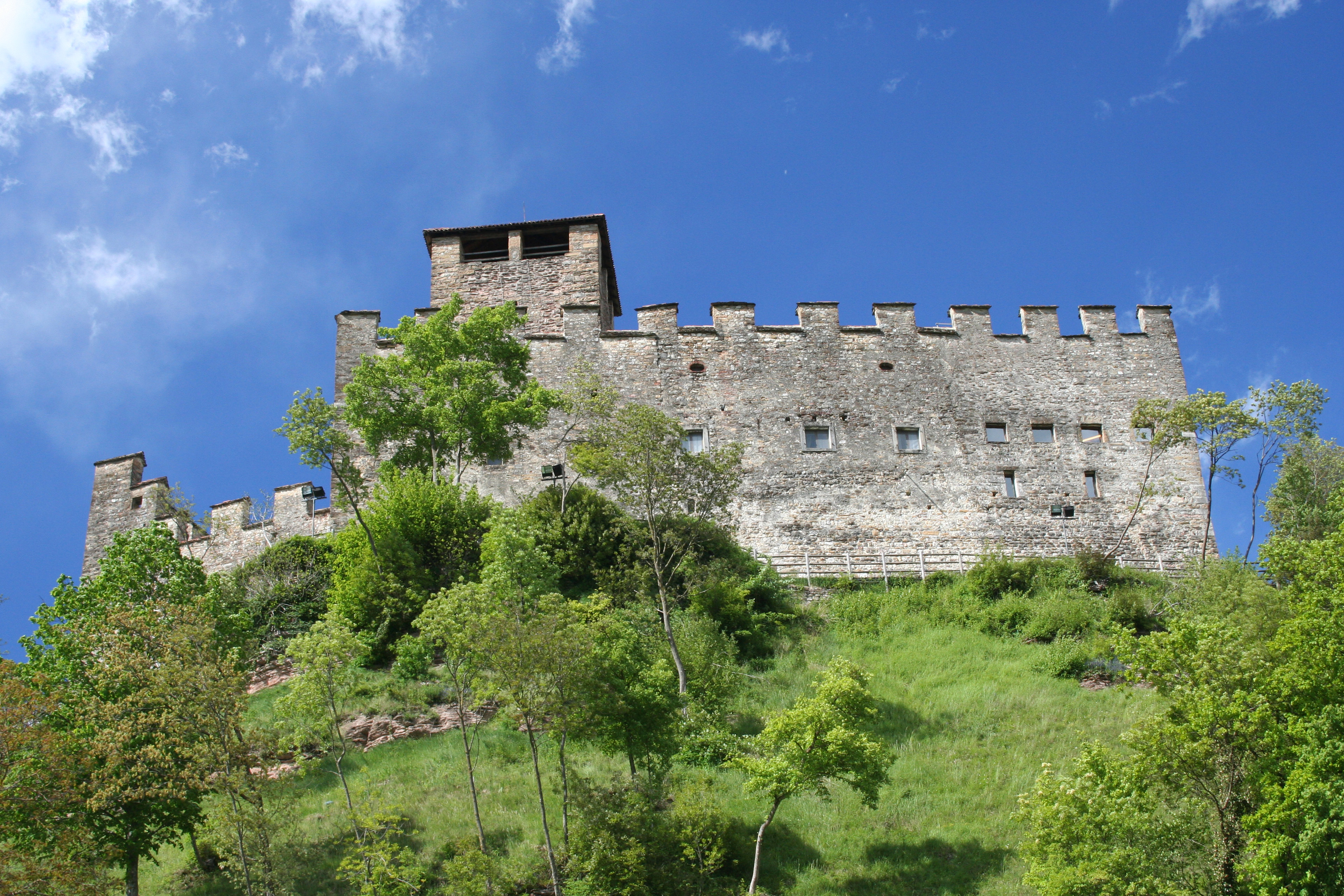
Castello di Zumelle, Feltre

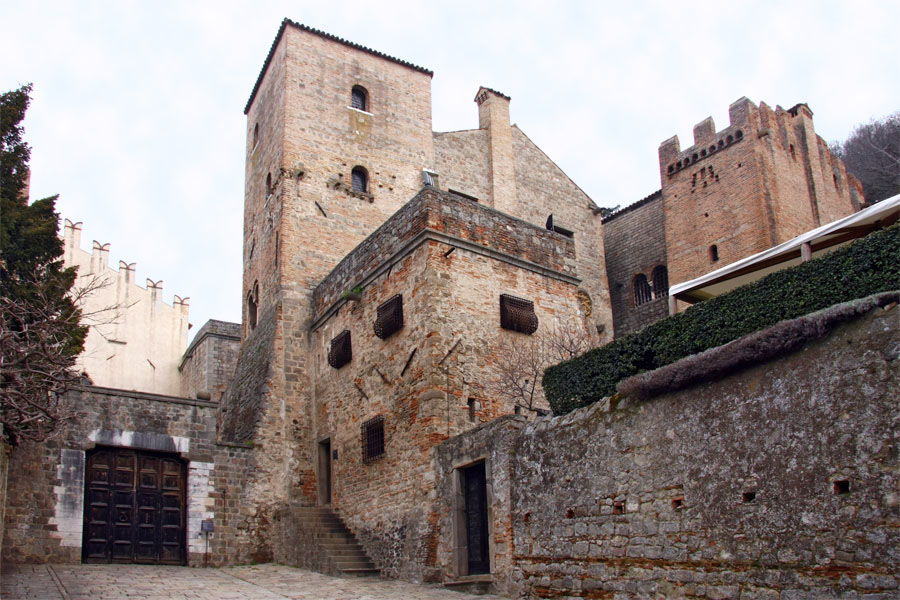
Cini Castle, Monselice

Castelbrando, Cison di Valmarino.

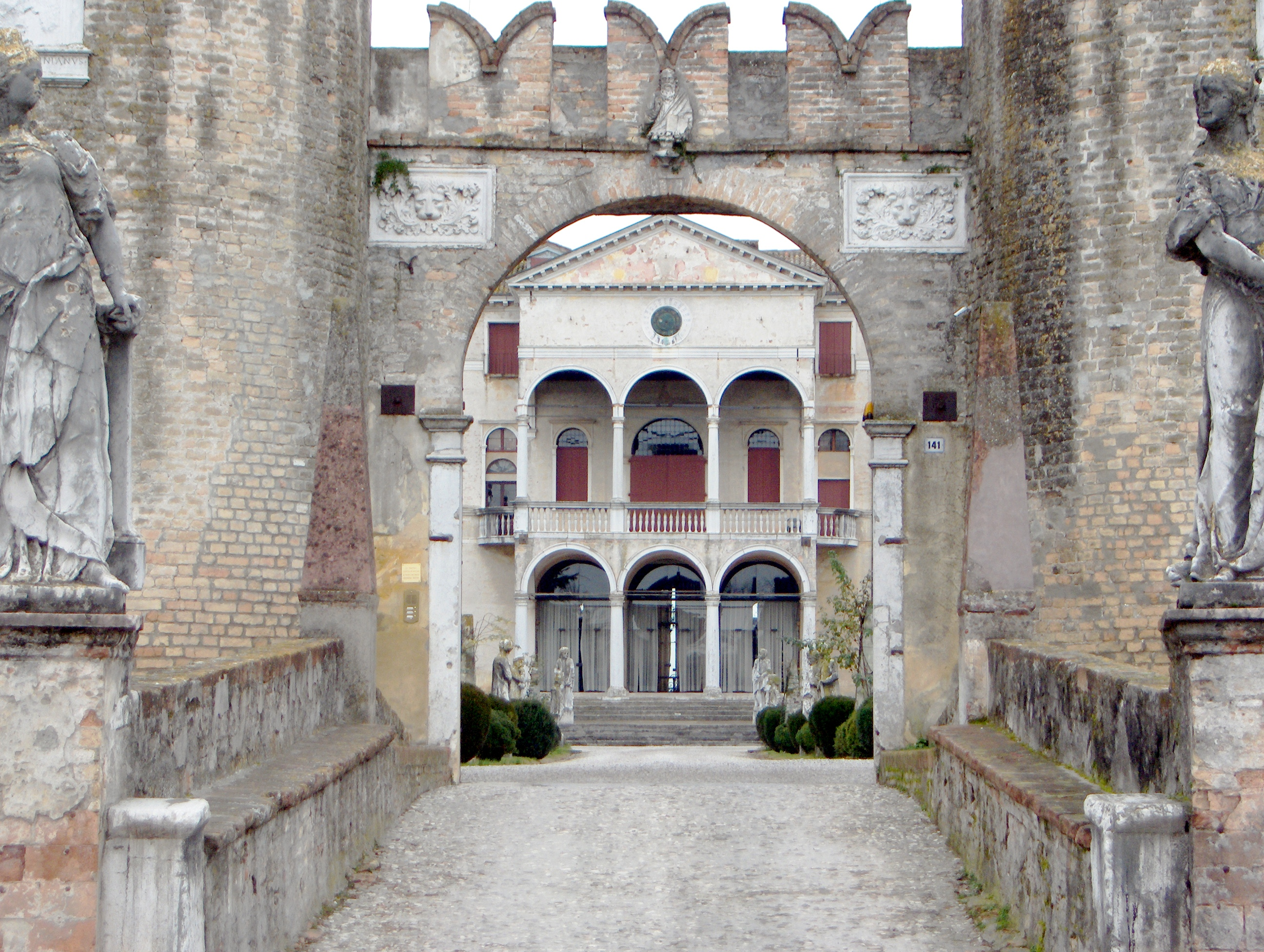
Castello di Roncade, Roncade

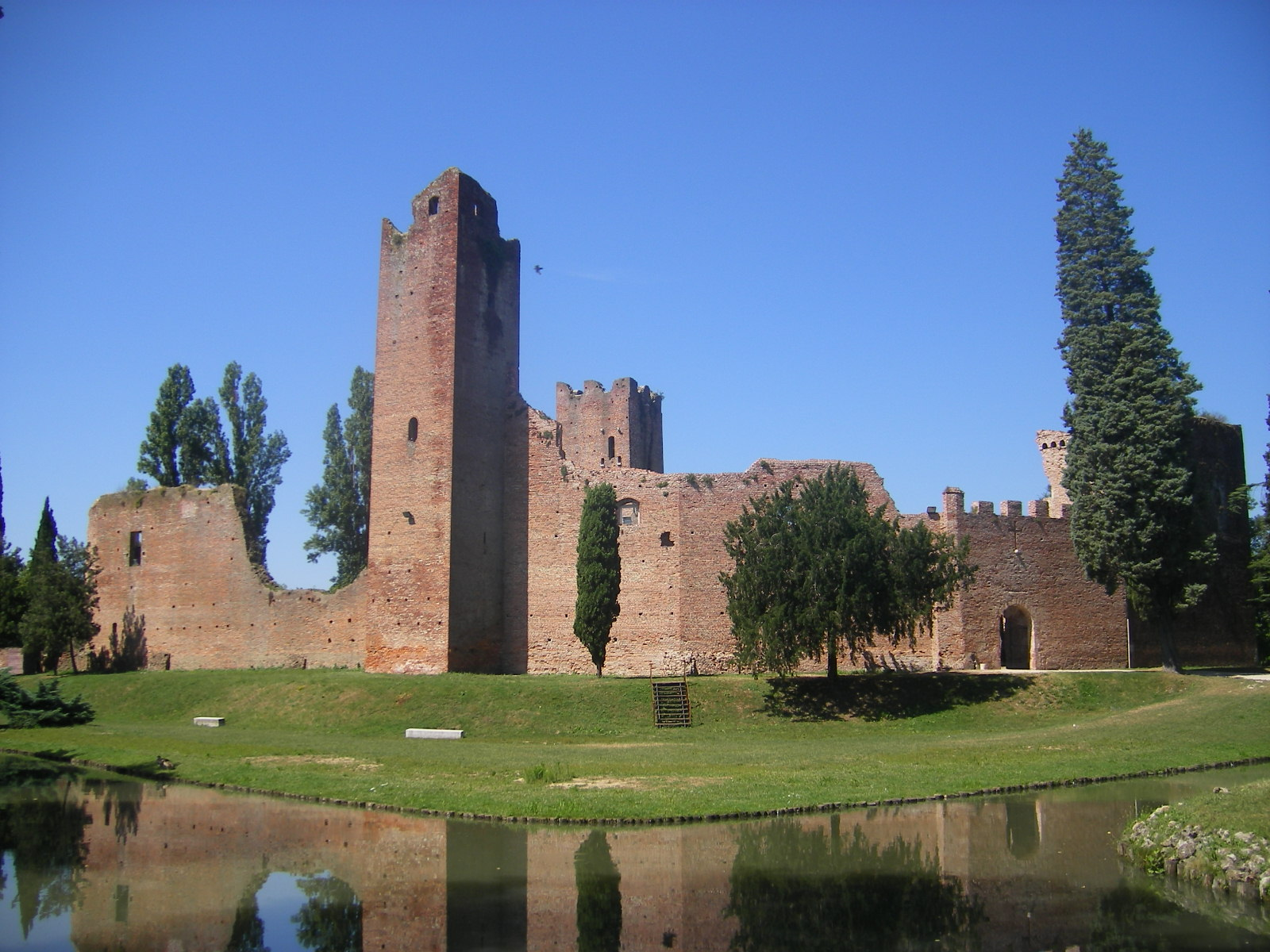
Rocca dei Tempesta, Noale

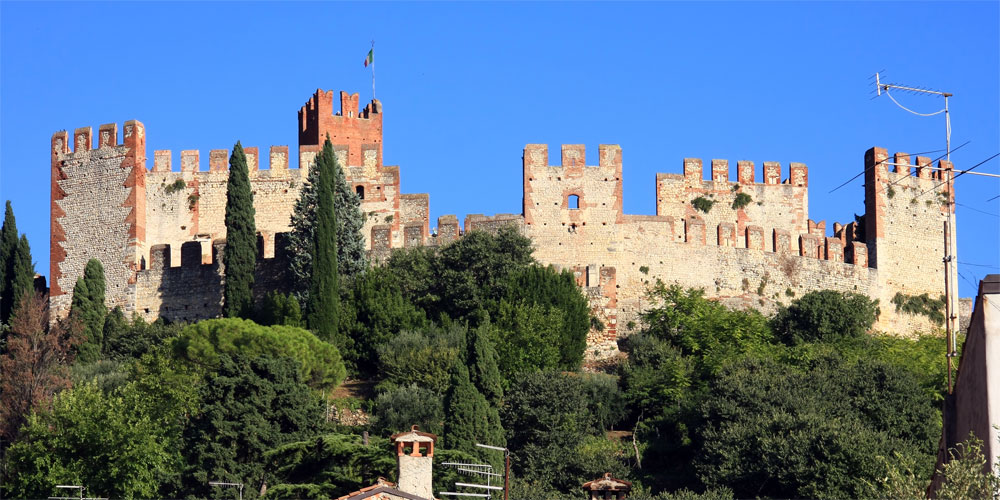
Castello Scaligero, Soave

Province of Belluno

- Castel Del Covolo, Cismon del Grappa
- Castello Colmirano, Alano Di Piave
- Castello Del Bongaio, Lamosano - Chies D'alpago
- Castello Di Alboino, Feltre
- Castello Di Andraz, Livinallongo del Col di Lana
- Castello Di Arten, Fonzaso
- Castello Di Avoscan, San Tomaso Agordino
- Castello Di Bivai, Bivai
- Castello di Botestagno, Cortina d’Ampezzo
- Castello Di Lusa, Feltre
- Castello Di Marsiai, Marsiai
- Castello Di Misso, Sospirolo
- Castello Di Quero, Quero
- Castello di Zumelle, Feltre

Province of Padua

- Castello di Padova, Padua
- Cittadella, Padua
- Castello del Catajo, Battaglia Terme
- Cini Castle, Monselice
- Castello Della Montecchia, Selvazzano Dentro
- Castello di Lispida, Monselice
- Castello di San Martino della Vaneza, Cervarese Santa Croce
- Castello Este, Este
- Castello di Valbona, Lozzo Atestino
- Castello Di San Pelagio, Padua
- Castello Di San Zeno, Montagnana
- Rocca Degli Alberi, Montagnana

Province of Rovigo

- Castello di Rovigo, Rovigo
- Castel Trivellin, Lendinara
- Castello di Arquà, Arquà Polesine
- Castello Di Sariano, Trecenta

Province of Treviso

- Castelbrando, Cison di Valmarino
- Castello di Roncade, Roncade
- Castello di Vidor, Vidor
- Castelletto Di Cappella Maggiore, Cappella Maggiore

Province of Venice

- Stigliano Castle, Santa Maria di Sala
- Mestre Castle, Mestre
- Fort Sant'Andrea, Venice
- Rocca dei Tempesta, Noale
- Torre Caligo, Jesolo

Province of Verona

- Castello Scaligeri, Malcesine
- Castello Scaligero (Soave), Soave
- Castelvecchio, Verona
- Castello Bevilacqua, Bevilacqua

Province of Vicenza

- Palazzo Porto Colleoni Thiene, Thiene
- Grimani-Sorlini's Castle, Montegalda

== See also ==
- List of castles
