= Salerano =

Salerano may refer to:

- Salerano Canavese, municipality in the Metropolitan City of Turin in the region Piedmont, Italy.
- Salerano sul Lambro, municipality in the Province of Lodi in the region Lombardy, Italy.
