= Loranzè =

- Comune
- Comune di Loranzè
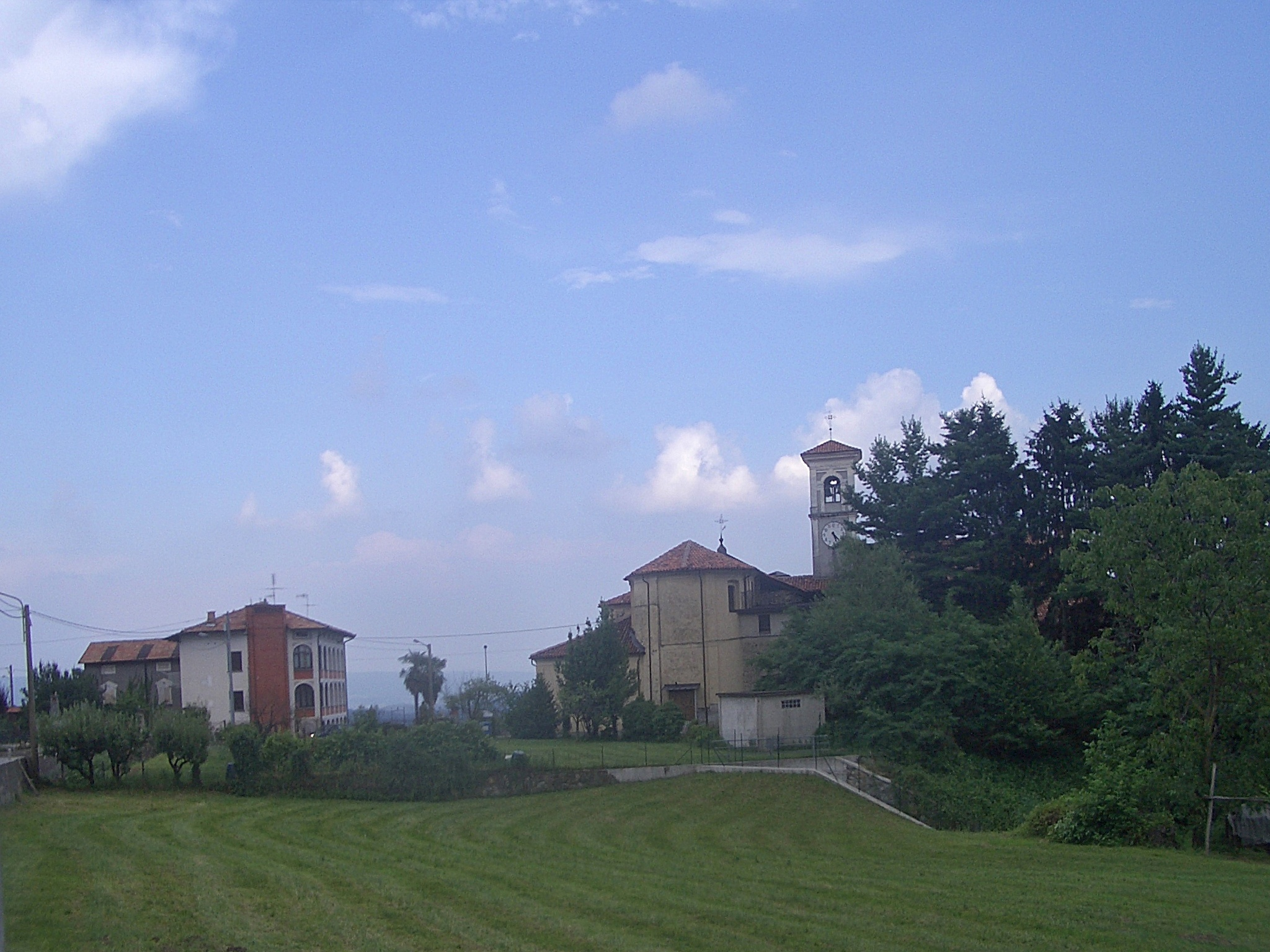

- Location within Italy Location within Piedmont
- Coordinates: 45°26′N 7°49′E
- Country: Italy
- Region: Piedmont
- Metropolitan city: Turin (TO)

Government
  - Mayor: Claudio Marchiori

Area
  - Total: 4.19 km^{2} (1.62 sq mi)
- Elevation: 243 m (797 ft)

Population (31 August 2021)
  - Total: 1,156
  - Density: 276/km^{2} (715/sq mi)
- Demonym: Loranzesi
- Time zone: UTC+1 (CET)
  - Summer (DST): UTC+2 (CEST)
- Postal code: 10010
- Dialing code: 0125
- Website: Official website

Loranzè is a comune (municipality) in the Metropolitan City of Turin in the Italian region Piedmont, located about 40 kilometres (25 mi) north of Turin.

Loranzè borders the following municipalities: Fiorano Canavese, Salerano Canavese, Samone, Val di Chy, Colleretto Giacosa, and Parella.

Main sights include Loranzè Castle.
