= Colleretto Giacosa =

- Comune
- Comune di Colleretto Giacosa
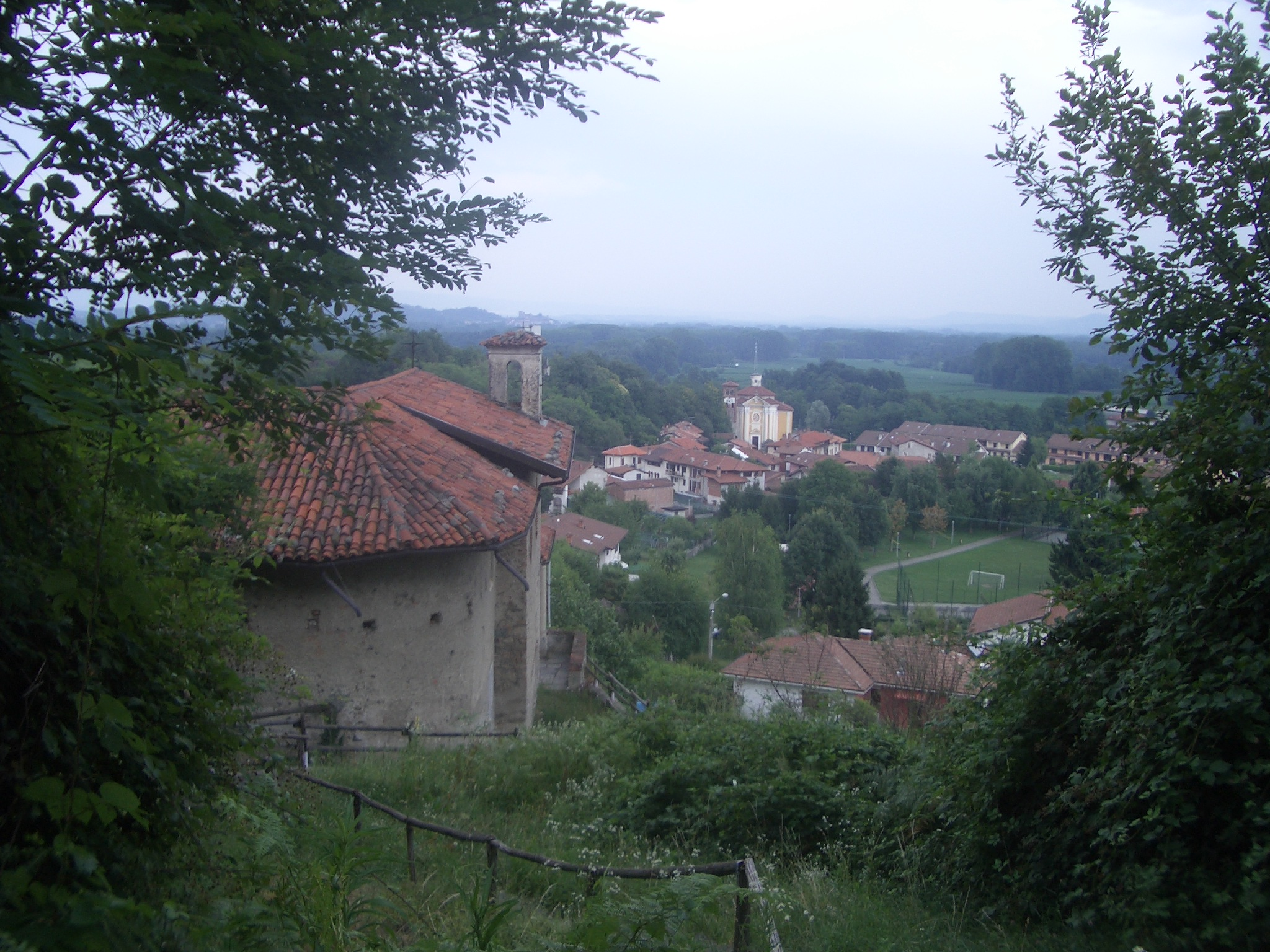

- Location within Italy Location within Piedmont
- Coordinates: 45°26′N 7°47′E
- Country: Italy
- Region: Piedmont
- Metropolitan city: Turin (TO)
- Frazioni: Campana

Government
  - Mayor: Ernesto Marco

Area
  - Total: 4.59 km^{2} (1.77 sq mi)
- Elevation: 280 m (920 ft)

Population (31 August 2021)
  - Total: 586
  - Density: 128/km^{2} (331/sq mi)
- Demonym: Collerettese(i)
- Time zone: UTC+1 (CET)
  - Summer (DST): UTC+2 (CEST)
- Postal code: 10010
- Dialing code: 0125
- Patron saint: San Felice
- Saint day: Third sunday of October

Colleretto Giacosa is a comune (municipality) in the Metropolitan City of Turin in the Italian region Piedmont, located about 40 kilometres (25 mi) north of Turin.

Colleretto Giacosa borders the following municipalities: Samone, Loranzè, Pavone Canavese, Parella, and San Martino Canavese.

The poet, playwright and librettist Giuseppe Giacosa (1847 – 1906) was born in the then Colleretto Parella, the town changed its name after him.
