= Fiorano Canavese =

- Comune
- Comune di Fiorano Canavese
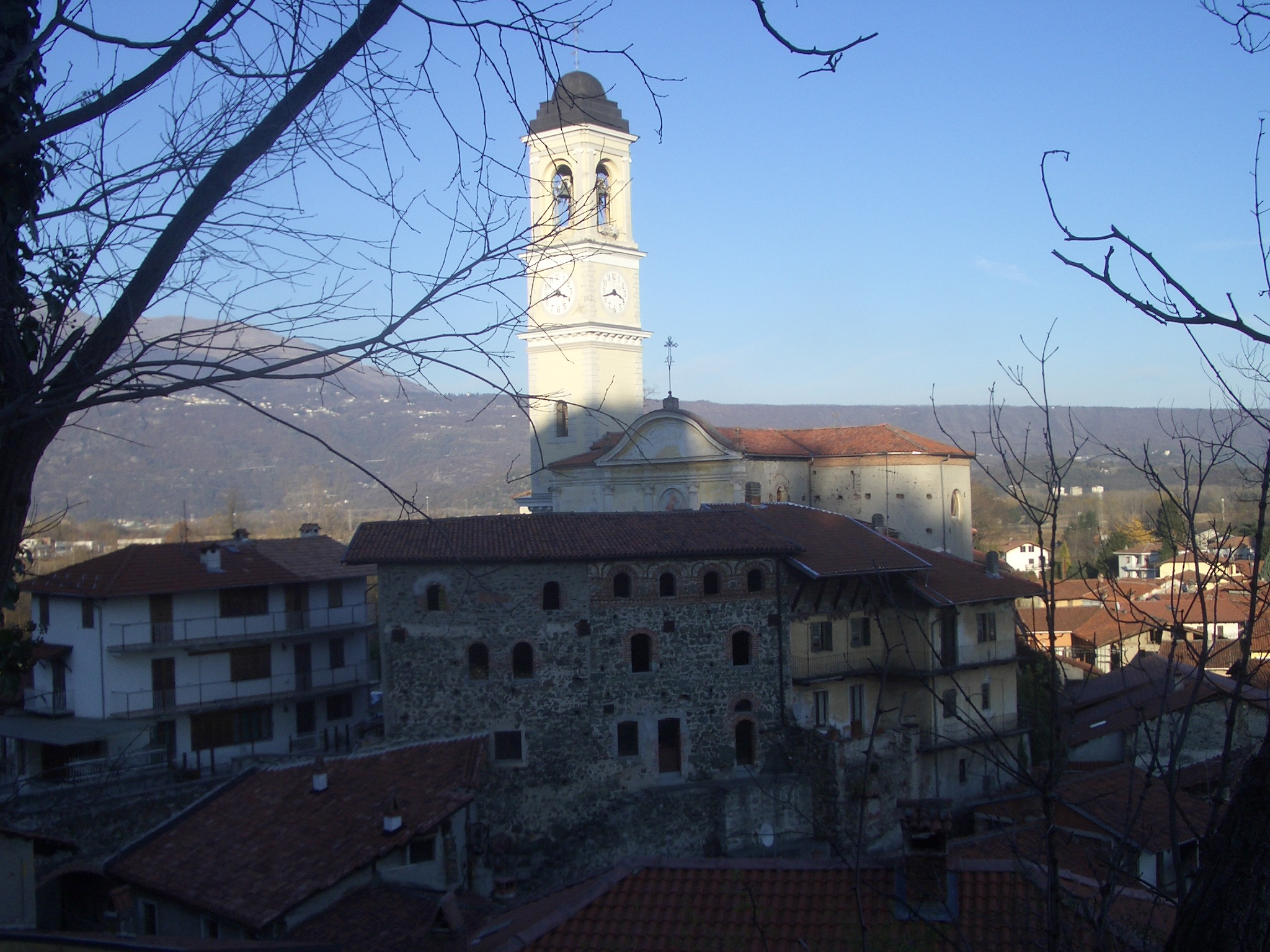

- Location within Italy Location within Piedmont
- Coordinates: 45°28′N 7°50′E
- Country: Italy
- Region: Piedmont
- Metropolitan city: Turin (TO)

Government
  - Mayor: Lamberto Marchesin

Area
  - Total: 4.35 km^{2} (1.68 sq mi)
- Elevation: 256 m (840 ft)

Population (31 August 2021)
  - Total: 732
  - Density: 168/km^{2} (436/sq mi)
- Demonym: Fioranesi
- Time zone: UTC+1 (CET)
  - Summer (DST): UTC+2 (CEST)
- Postal code: 10010
- Dialing code: 0125
- Website: Official website

Fiorano Canavese is a comune (municipality) in the Metropolitan City of Turin in the Italian region Piedmont, located about 45 kilometres (28 mi) north of Turin.

Fiorano Canavese borders the following municipalities: Montalto Dora, Lessolo, Val di Chy, Ivrea, Banchette, Banchette, Salerano Canavese, Samone, and Loranzè.
