= Parella Castle =

Castle in Parella, Piedmont, Italy

- Castello di Parella
- Parella, Piedmont, Italy
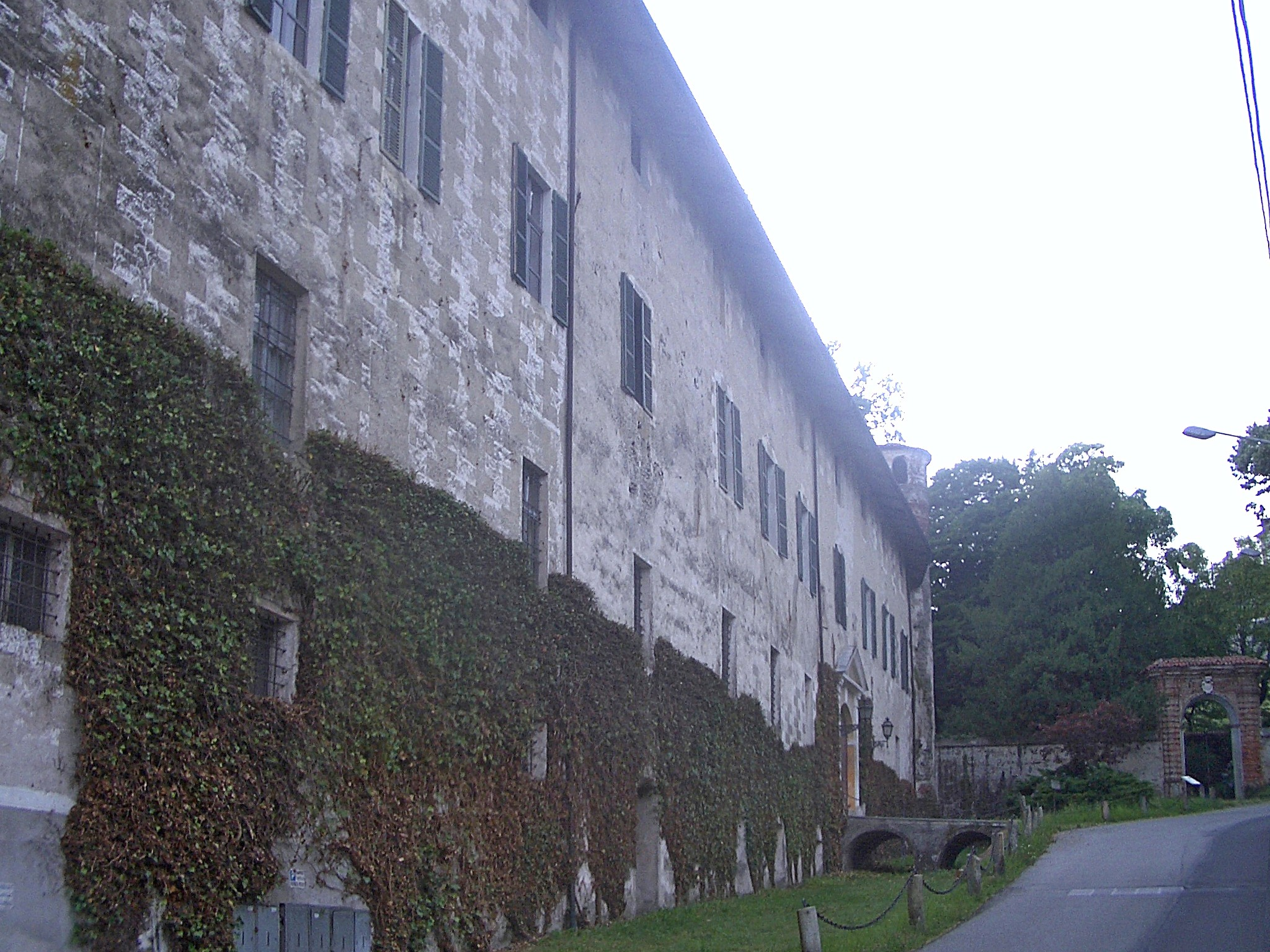
- Parella Castle

Site information
- Type: Castle

Location
- Location in Italy
- Coordinates: 45°25′48.55″N 7°47′47.67″E

Parella Castle (Italian: Castello di Parella) is a castle located in Parella, Piedmont, Italy.

== History ==
The castle evolved from a medieval fortified tollhouse along the road between Ivrea and Castellamonte. In the 14th century, after the Tuchinaggio rebellions, which likely damaged the San Martino family’s primary castle, situated further uphill in Parella, the family relocated their residence to this structure.

Starting from 1545, Alessio I of the San Martino family undertook significant renovations, transforming the structure into a noble residence adorned with frescoes and decorations. After centuries of ownership by the San Martino family, the castle passed through various hands including those of a religious order.

== Gallery ==
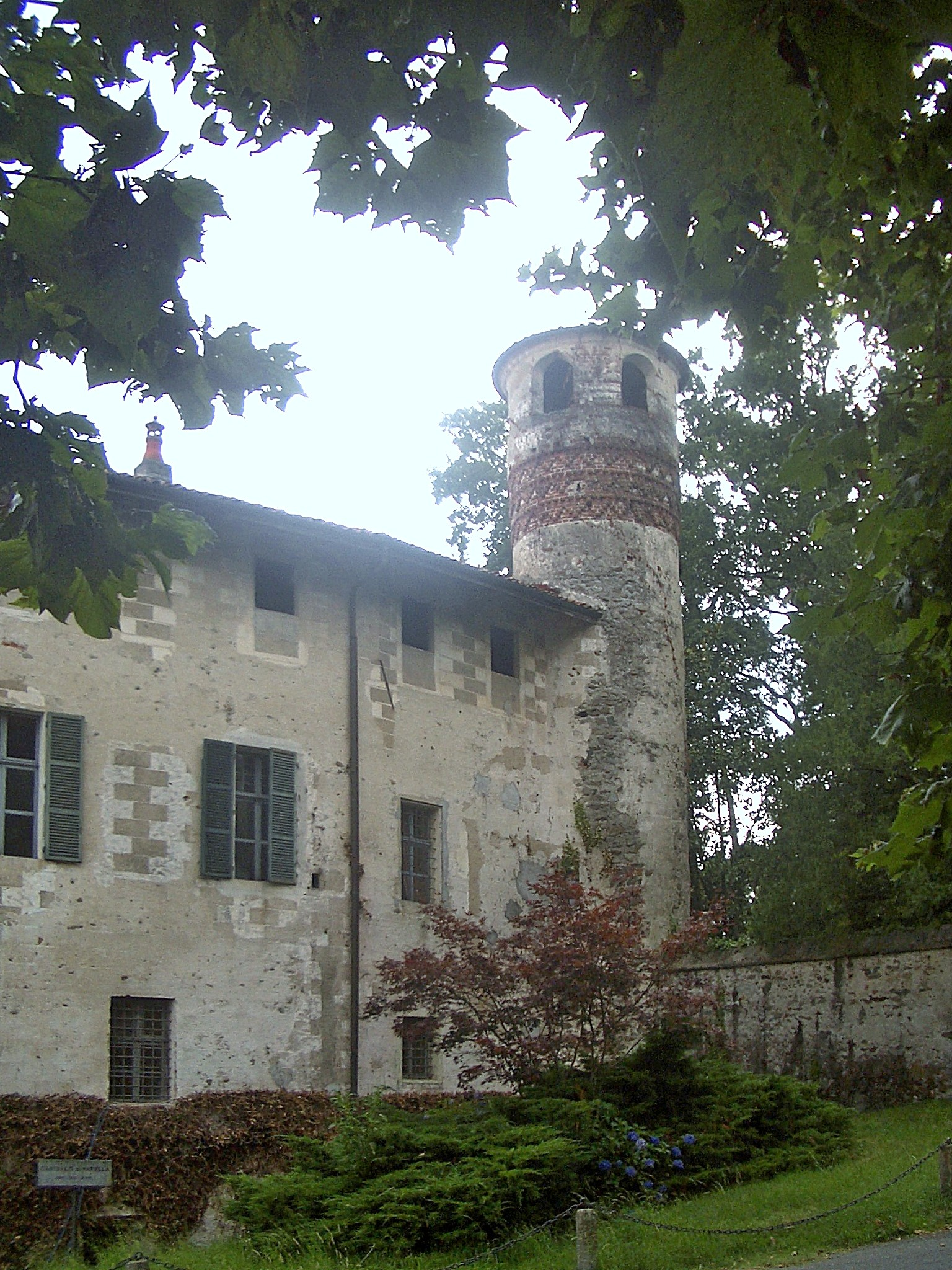

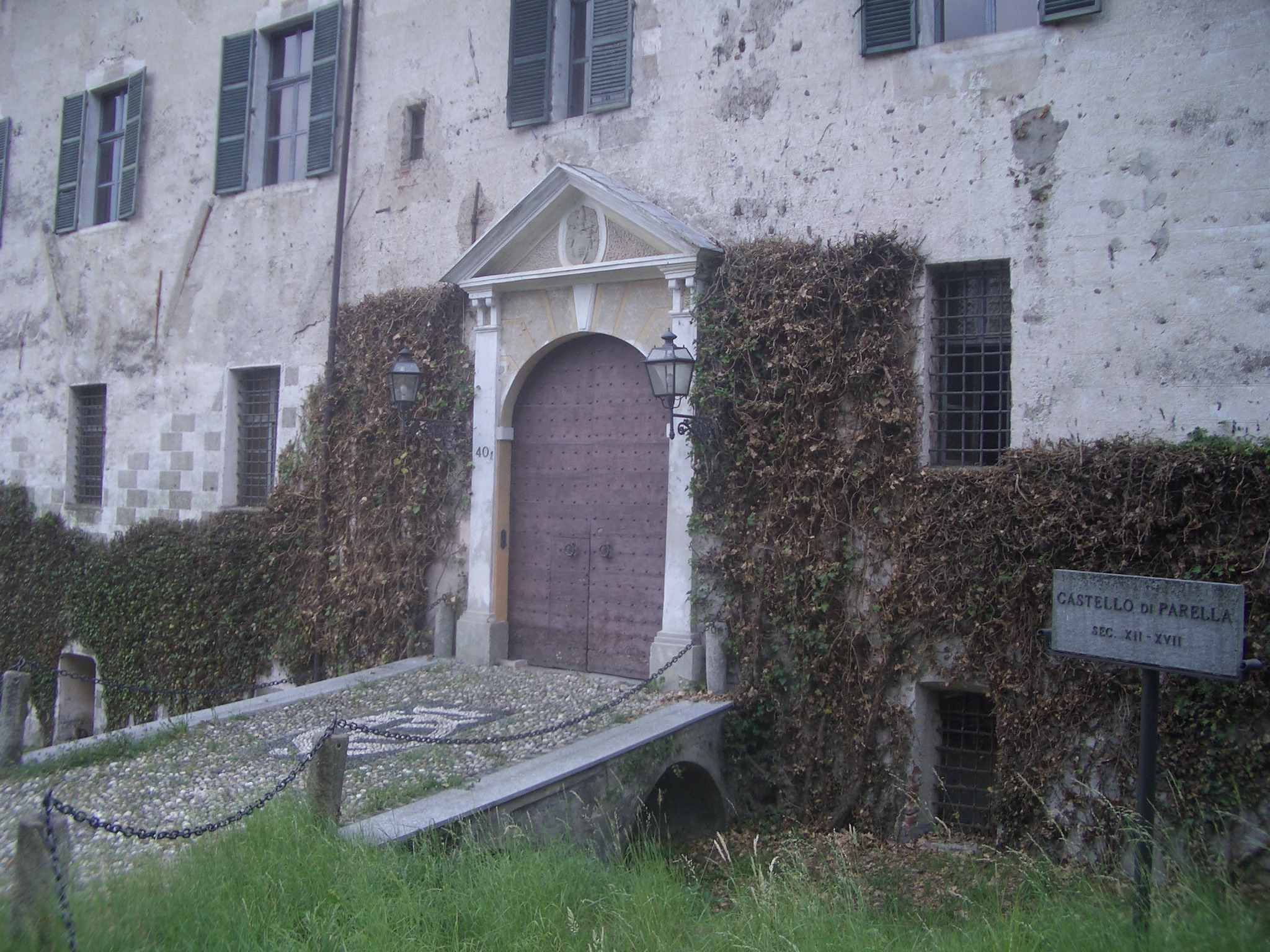
