= Pavone Canavese =

- Comune
- Comune di Pavone Canavese
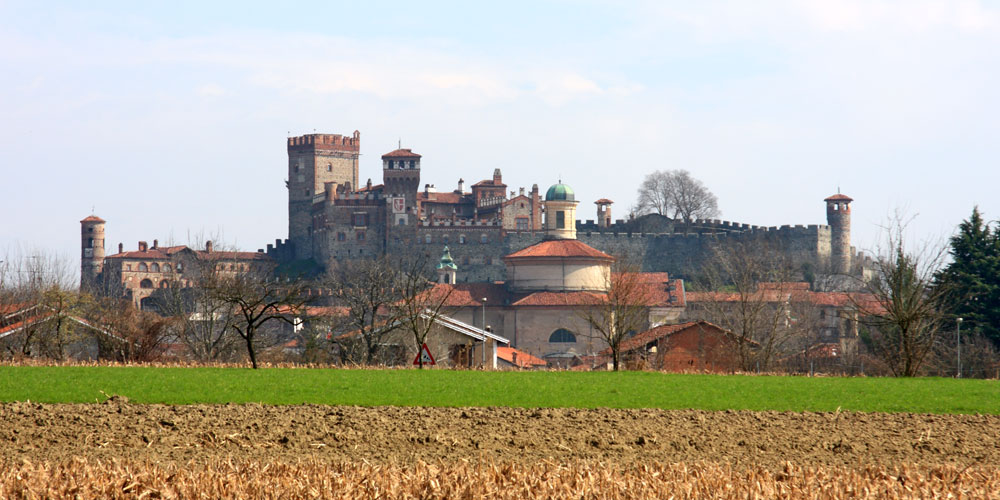

- Location within Italy Location within Piedmont
- Coordinates: 45°27′N 7°51′E
- Country: Italy
- Region: Piedmont
- Metropolitan city: Turin (TO)

Government
  - Mayor: Alessandro Andrea Perenchio

Area
  - Total: 11.1 km^{2} (4.3 sq mi)
- Elevation: 262 m (860 ft)

Population (31 December 2010)
  - Total: 3,899
  - Density: 351/km^{2} (910/sq mi)
- Demonym: Pavonesi
- Time zone: UTC+1 (CET)
  - Summer (DST): UTC+2 (CEST)
- Postal code: 10018
- Dialing code: 0125
- Patron saint: St. Andrew
- Saint day: November 30
- Website: Official website

Pavone Canavese is a comune (municipality) in the Metropolitan City of Turin in the Italian region Piedmont, located about 45 km northeast of Turin.

Pavone Canavese borders the following municipalities: Ivrea, Banchette, Samone, Colleretto Giacosa, Romano Canavese, Perosa Canavese, San Martino Canavese.

Main sights include Pavone Canavese Castle.
