= Samone, Piedmont =

Samone
- Comune
- Comune di Samone
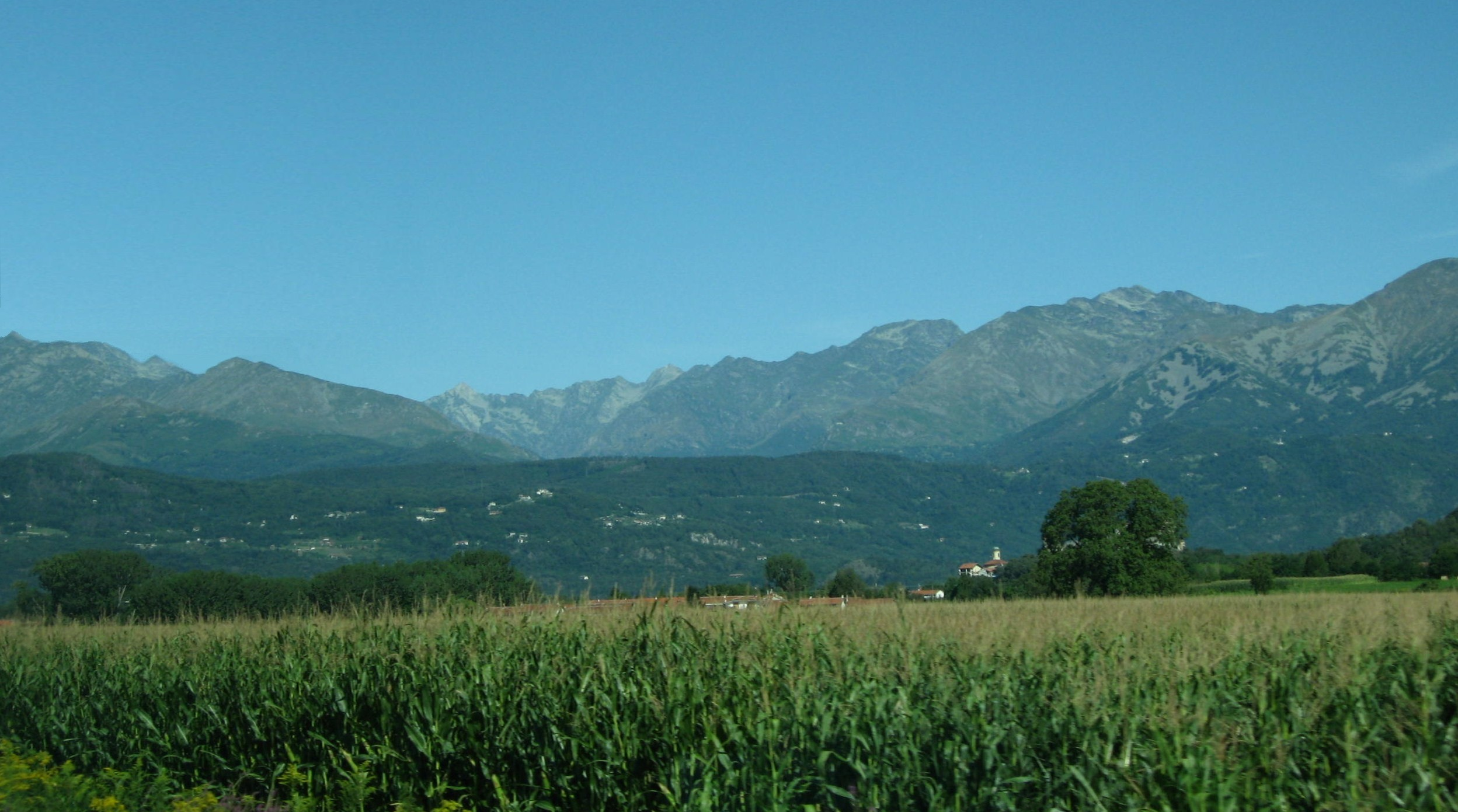

- Location within Italy Location within Piedmont
- Coordinates: 45°26′N 7°50′E
- Country: Italy
- Region: Piedmont
- Metropolitan city: Turin (TO)

Area
  - Total: 2.5 km^{2} (0.97 sq mi)

Population (Dec. 2004)
  - Total: 1,513
  - Density: 610/km^{2} (1,600/sq mi)
- Time zone: UTC+1 (CET)
  - Summer (DST): UTC+2 (CEST)
- Postal code: 10010
- Dialing code: 0125

Samone is a comune (municipality) in the Metropolitan City of Turin in the Italian region Piedmont, located about 40 kilometres (25 mi) north of Turin. As of 31 December 2004, it had a population of 1,513 and an area of 2.5 square kilometres (0.97 mi^{2}).

Samone borders the following municipalities: Fiorano Canavese, Banchette, Salerano Canavese, Loranzè, Pavone Canavese, and Colleretto Giacosa.

Main sights include Samone Castle, also known as Villa Garda.

== Demographic evolution ==
Historical population

| Year | Pop. | ±% |
|---|---|---|
| 1861 | 703 | — |
| 1871 | 716 | +1.8% |
| 1881 | 746 | +4.2% |
| 1901 | 821 | +10.1% |
| 1911 | 708 | −13.8% |

| Year | Pop. | ±% |
|---|---|---|
| 1921 | 780 | +10.2% |
| 1931 | 725 | −7.1% |
| 1936 | 680 | −6.2% |
| 1951 | 827 | +21.6% |
| 1961 | 1,029 | +24.4% |

| Year | Pop. | ±% |
|---|---|---|
| 1971 | 1,433 | +39.3% |
| 1981 | 1,285 | −10.3% |
| 1991 | 1,493 | +16.2% |
| 2001 | 1,473 | −1.3% |

Source: Data from ISTAT
