= Banchette Castle =

Castle in Banchette, Piedmont, Italy

- Castello di Banchette
- Banchette, Piedmont, Italy
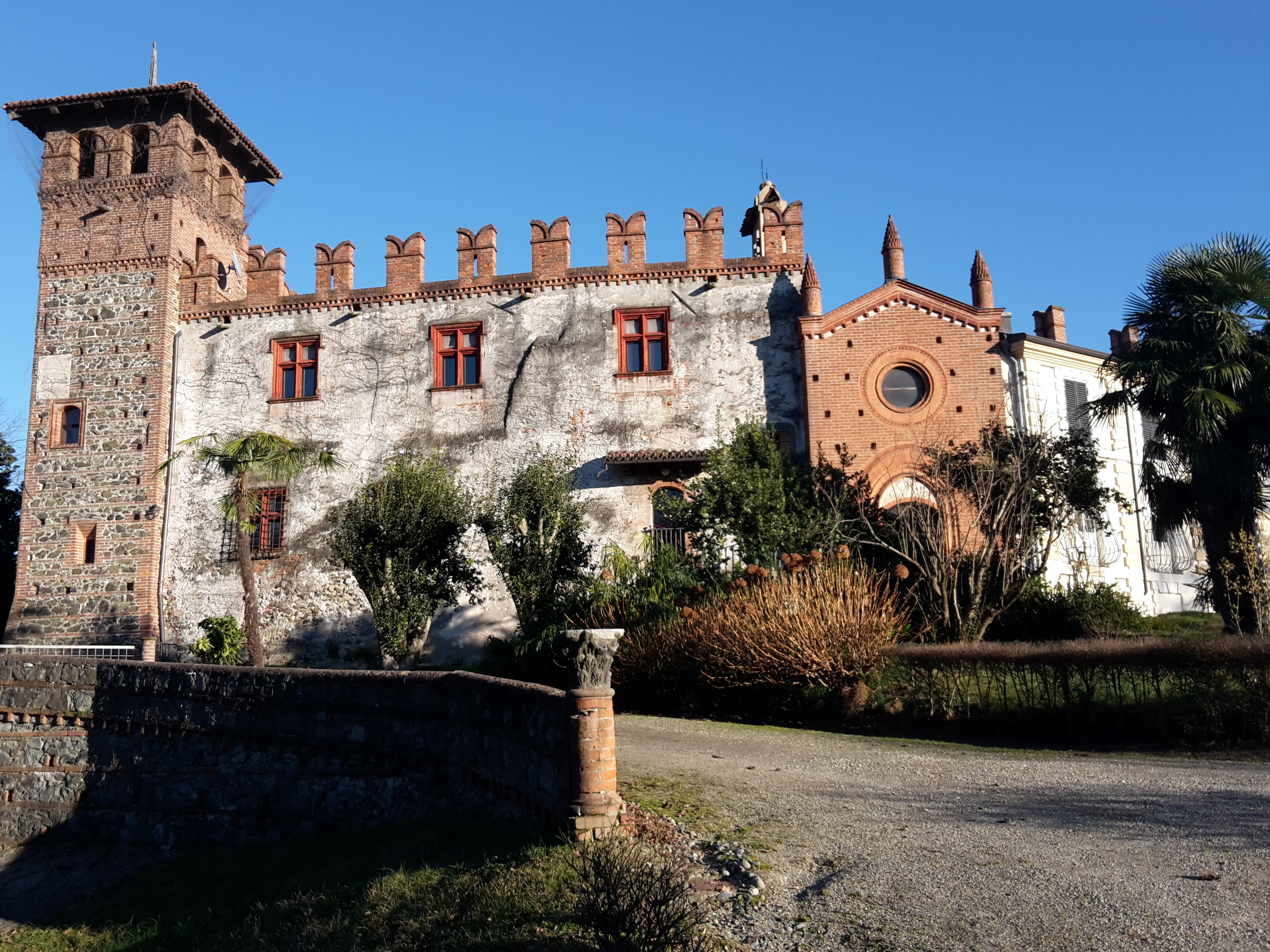

Site information
- Type: Castle

Location
- Coordinates: 45°27′43.63″N 7°51′28.45″E

Banchette Castle (Italian: Castello di Banchette) is a castle located in Banchette, Piedmont, Italy.

== History ==
The castle already existed in the 12th century. It was originally built as a fortified house upon ancient Roman vestiges by the Di Banchette family.

At the end of the 19th century, Emilio Pinchia, owner of the property at that time, commissioned Ottavio Germano to renovate the castle. Germano had previously worked as collaborator of the more famous architect Alfredo d'Andrade.

== Gallery ==
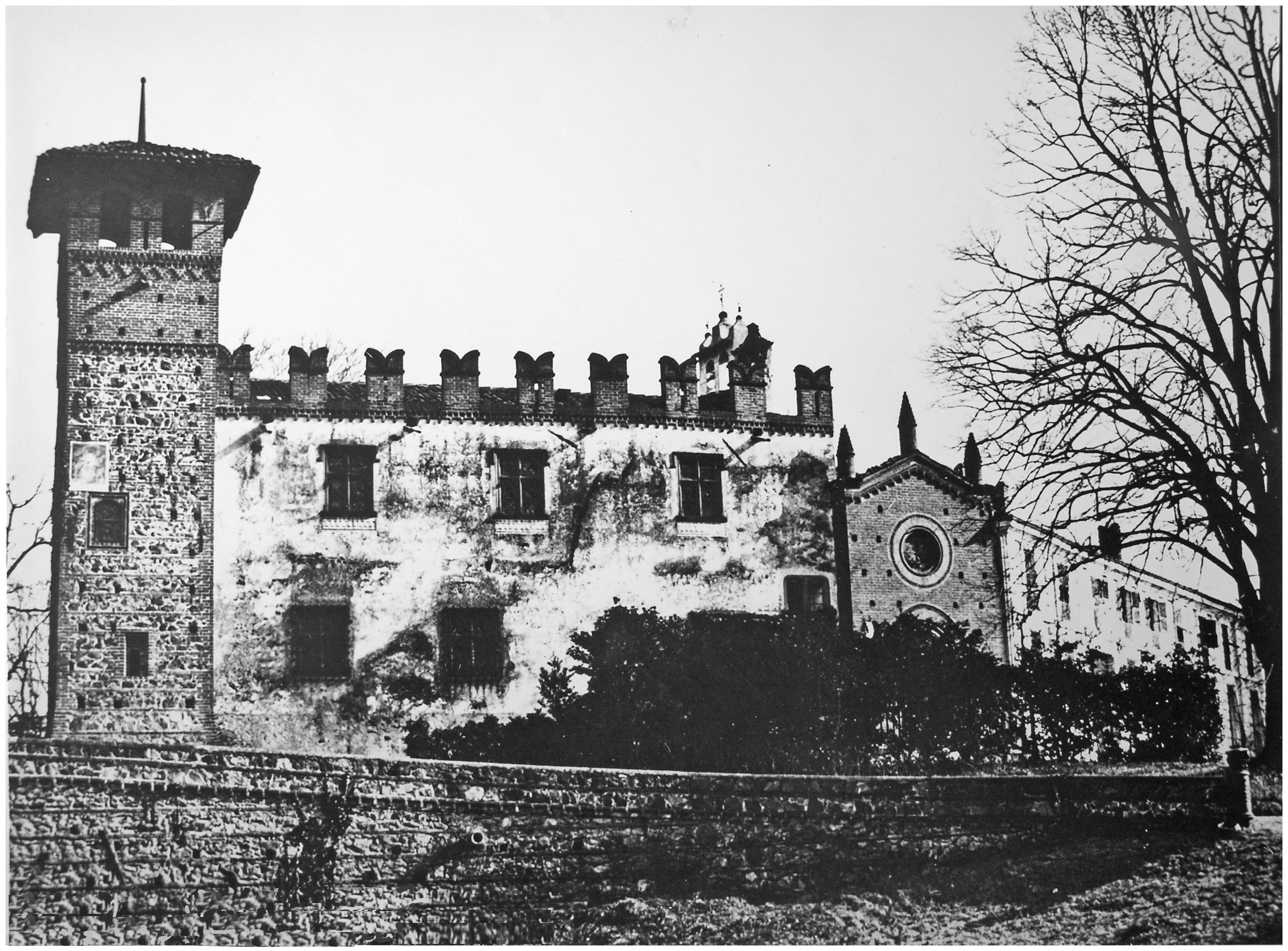
Vintage photograph

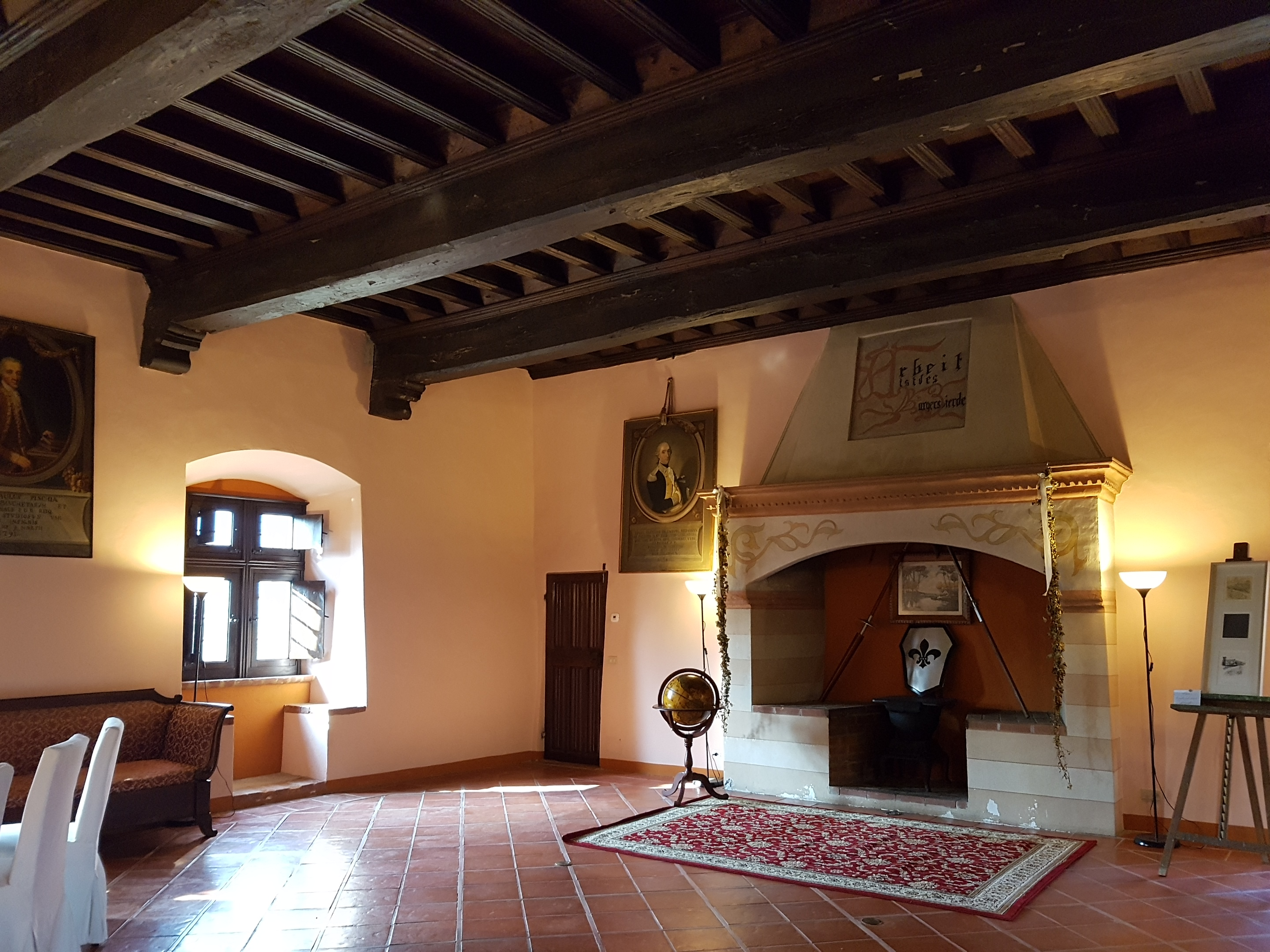
Room

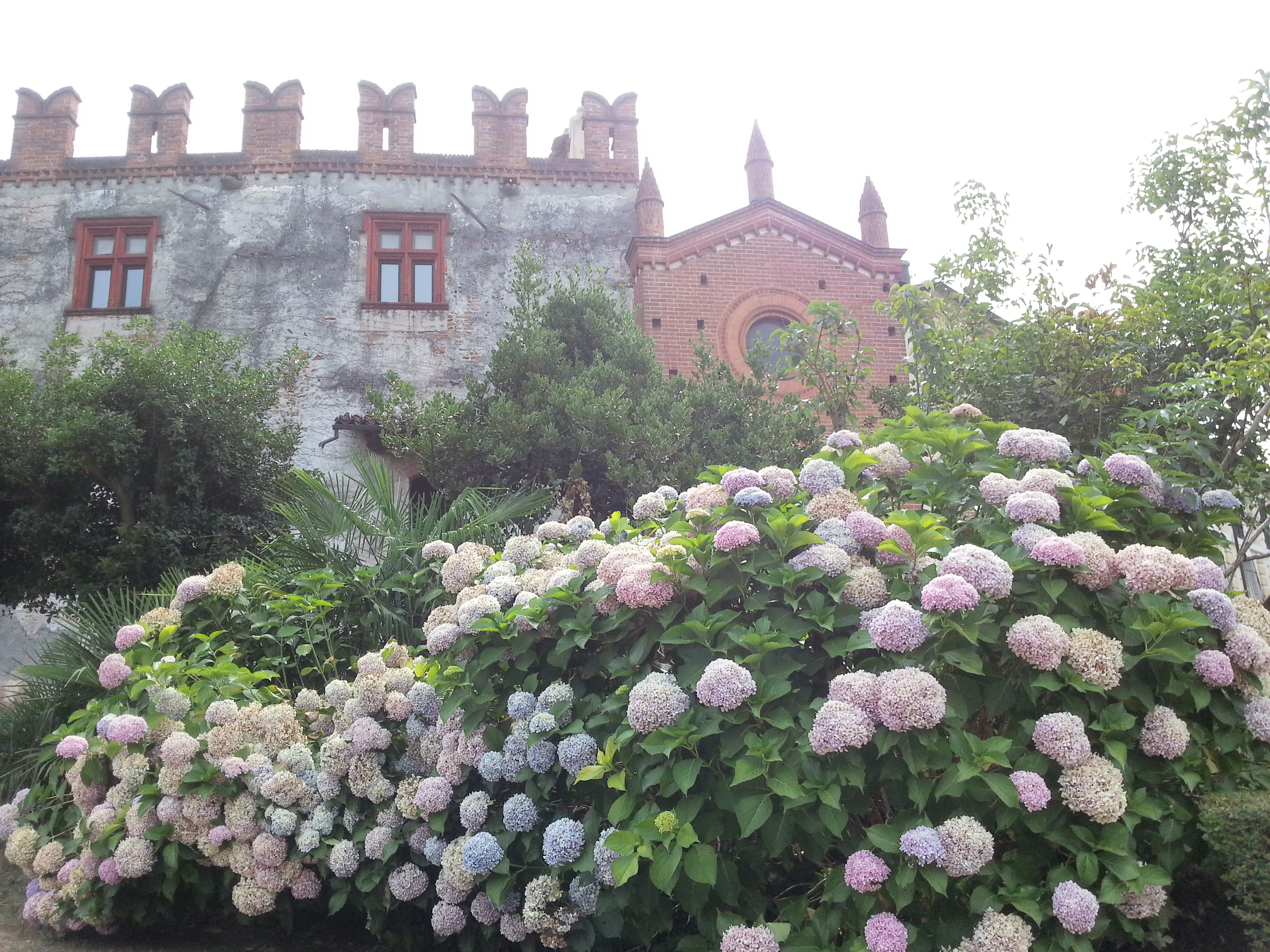
Façade

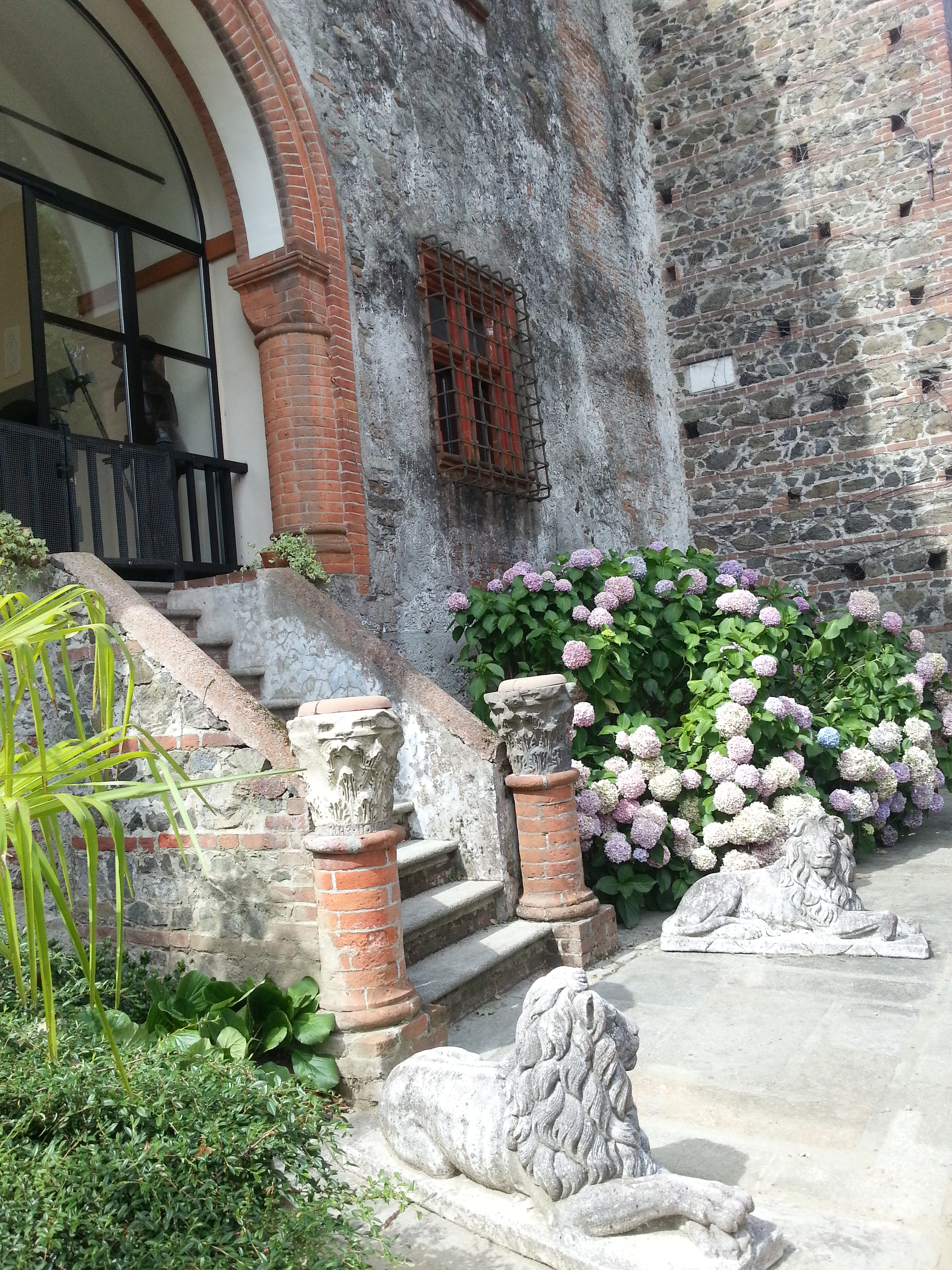
Entrance
