= Samone Castle =

Castle in Piedmont, Italy

- Castello di Samone
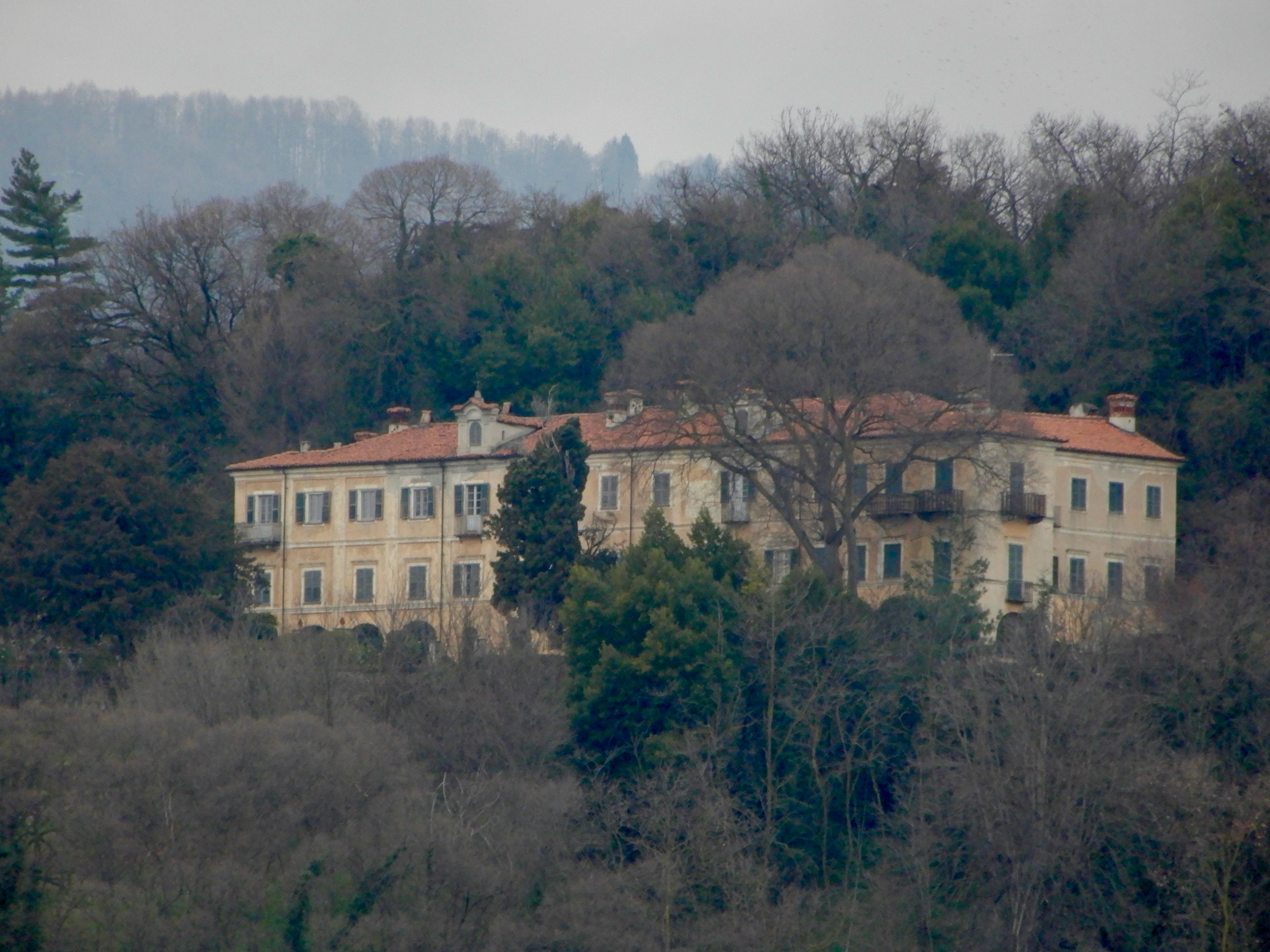
- Samone Castle in 2025
- Click on the map for a fullscreen view

General information
- Location: Samone, Piedmont, Italy
- Coordinates: 45°27′08.85″N 7°50′37.56″E

Samone Castle (Italian: Castello di Samone), also known as Villa Garda, is a castle located in Samone, Piedmont, Italy.

== History ==
The castle was built in the second half of the 18th century by Francesco Antonio Garda as a countryside residence, on the remains of a previous 16th-century structure. Over the decades, the building underwent various modifications by his descendants and new owners. Italian art collector and politician Pier Alessandro Garda also lived in the castle.

== Description ==
The castle stands halfway up the hill overlooking the town of Samone. The building features a Neoclassical style.
