= Loranzè Castle =

Castle in Piedmont, Italy

- Castello di Loranzè
- Loranzè, Piedmont, Italy
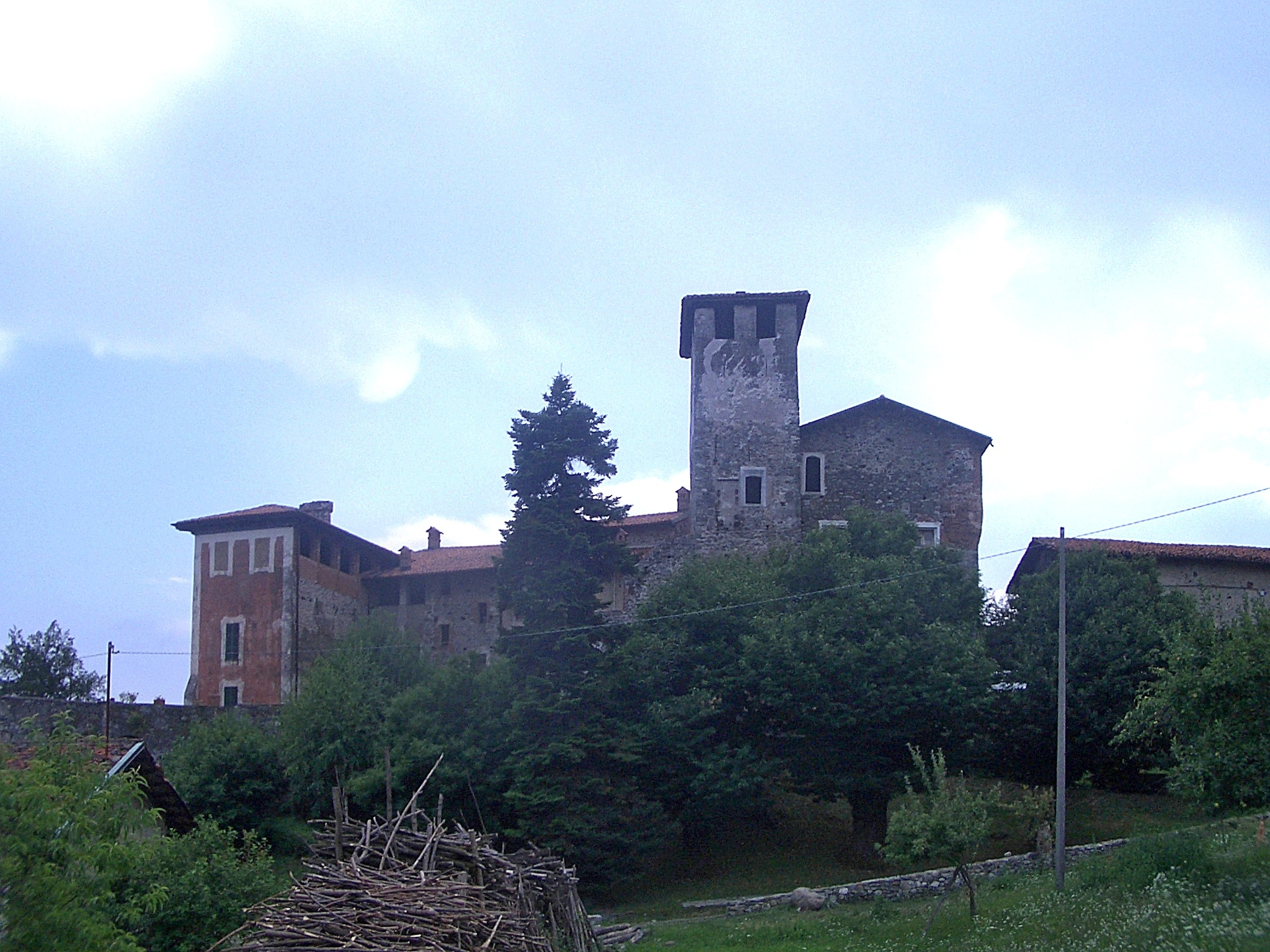
- Loranzè Castle

Site information
- Type: Castle

Location
- Location in Italy
- Coordinates: 45°26′08.08″N 7°47′48.25″E

Loranzè Castle (Italian: Castello di Loranzè), also known as the Red Castle (Italian: Castello Rosso), is a castle located in Loranzè, Piedmont, Italy.

== History ==
The first construction of the castle dates back to the 11th century, when it was built on the ruins of a circular structure, possibly a watchtower. From this period, only some walls and the square tower remain, incorporated into later structures. The first historical mention of the castle is from 1041 and is found in the foundation charter of the Monastery of Santo Stefano in Ivrea. During the 14th century, the castle, owned by the San Martino family, withstood attacks by the Valperga family amidst the struggles between Guelphs and Ghibellines but suffered severe damage in 1386–87 during the Tuchini revolt, being partially destroyed and looted. The reconstruction marked a new phase for the castle, with extensive use of brickwork. In the 16th century, Carlo di Loranzè built the southeast wing, transforming the structure into a civil residence, distinguished by the pinkish plaster that earned it the name Red Castle. In the following centuries, further modifications and reconstructions have made it difficult to distinguish the original forms of the ancient fortress.
