= Pavone Canavese Castle =

- Castello di Pavone Canavese
- Pavone Canavese, Piedmont, Italy
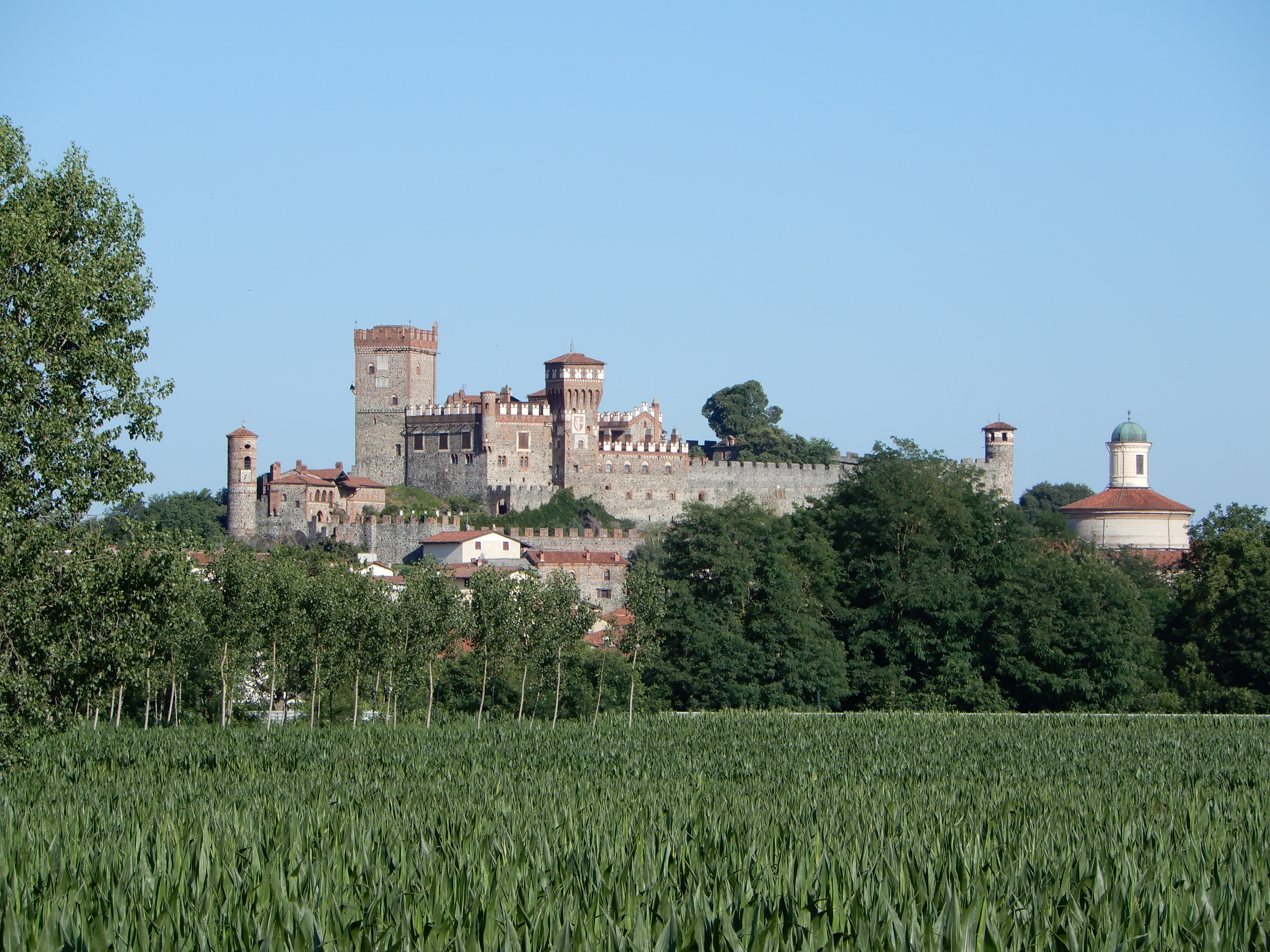

Site information
- Type: Castle

Location
- Coordinates: 45°26′10.86″N 7°51′22.57″E

Site history
- Built: IX-X century

Pavone Canavese Castle (Italian: Castello di Pavone Canavese) is a castle located in Pavone Canavese, Piedmont, Italy.

== History ==
The castle was built between the 9th and 10th centuries, at the time of the Hungarian and Saracen invasions, when a defensive wall was erected around the Church of San Pietro, enclosing several buildings. This initial settlement formed the core of the castle, which served as a fortress located among various refuges in a hilly area. On July 9, 1000, Emperor Otto III granted the bishop of Ivrea jurisdiction over the surrounding territory, making the castle part of the bishopric's possession.

In the following centuries, the bishops promoted a series of expansion and fortification campaigns for the castle. In the 11th century, a square-plan tower was built, while in the 12th century, the keep was enhanced with a new building consisting of two stacked rooms. Between 1326 and 1346, a new wing was added to the north, characterized by pointed-arch windows, and a tower-gate was built as the main entrance. By the end of the 14th century, new architectural interventions were made, including the addition of circular-plan towers in the outer wall and further rooms extending into the courtyard area.

In 1888, the castle started undergoing renovation works under the direction of architect Alfredo d'Andrade, which were later completed, after his death, by his son Ruy d'Andrade.

In 1981, the castle was declared a national monument.

== Gallery ==
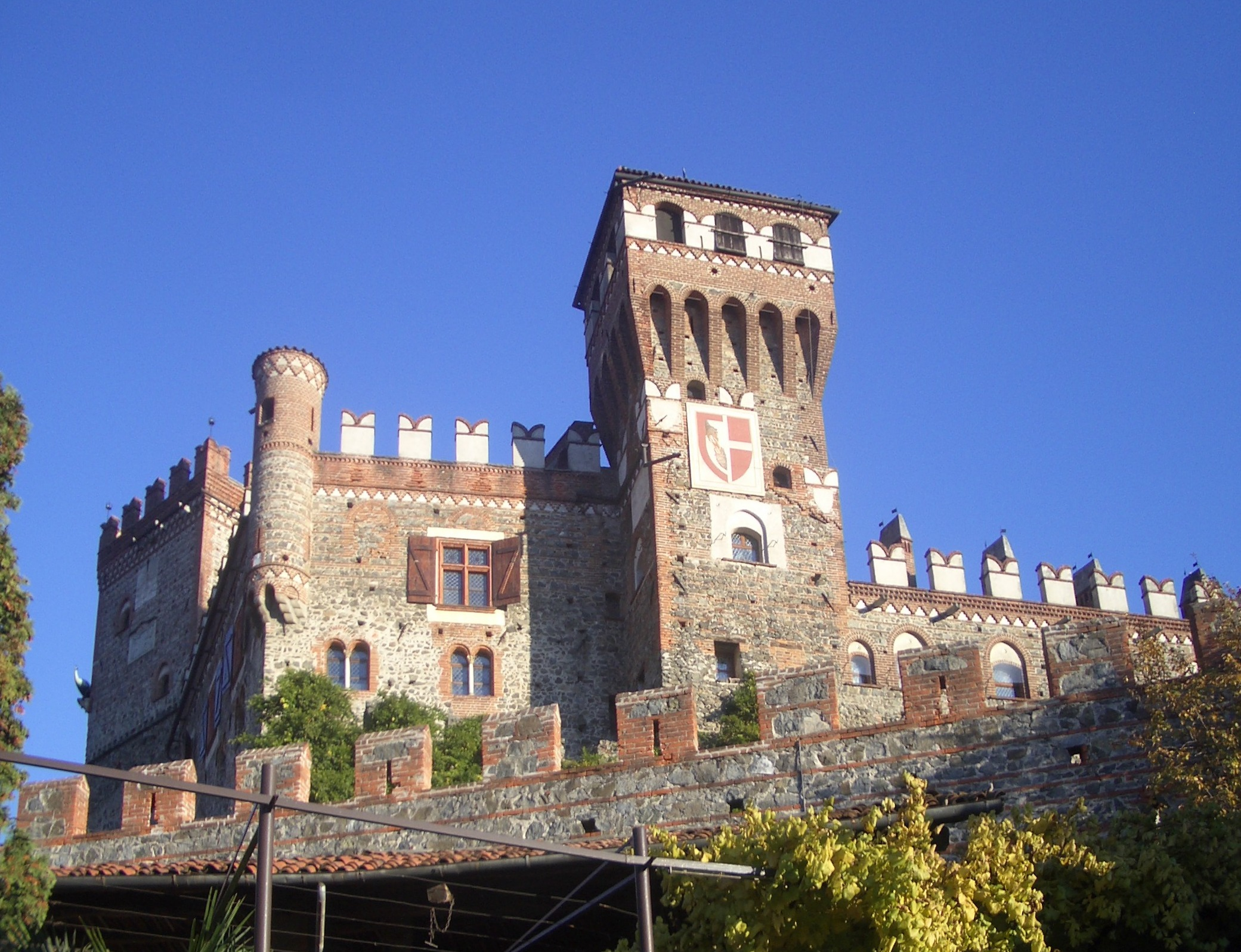

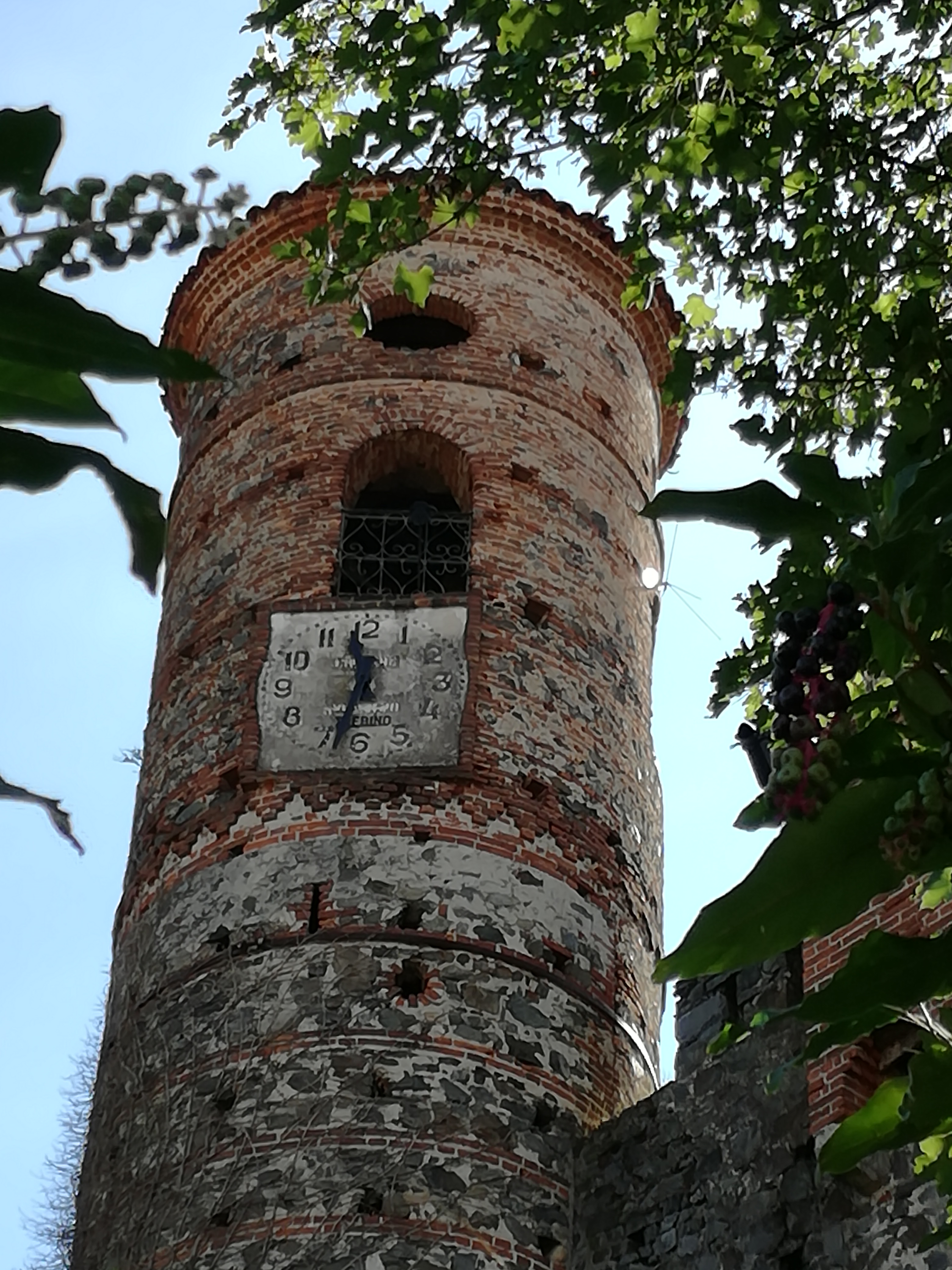

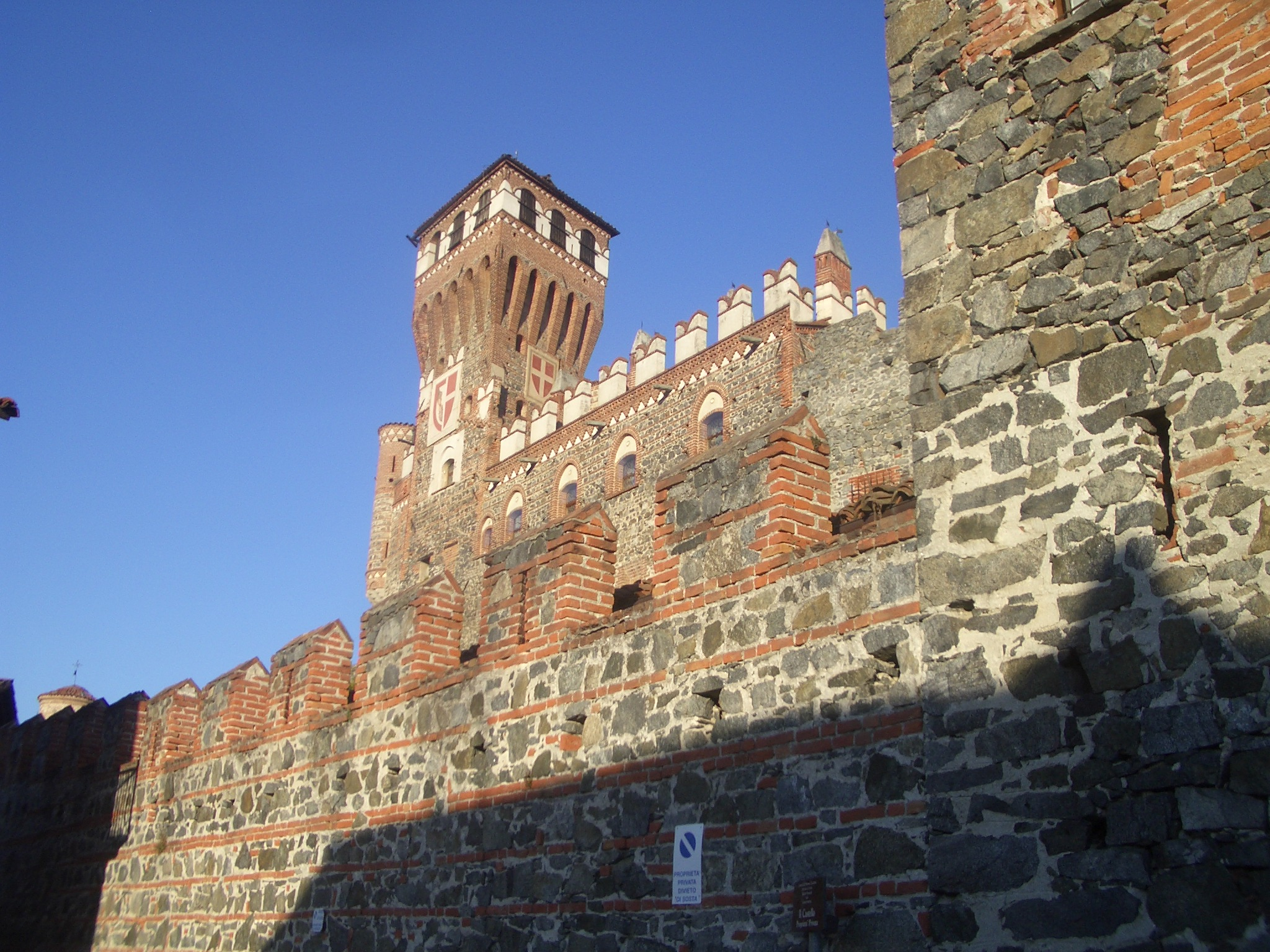
