= Villa Pallavicino, Salerano Canavese =

Villa Pallavicino
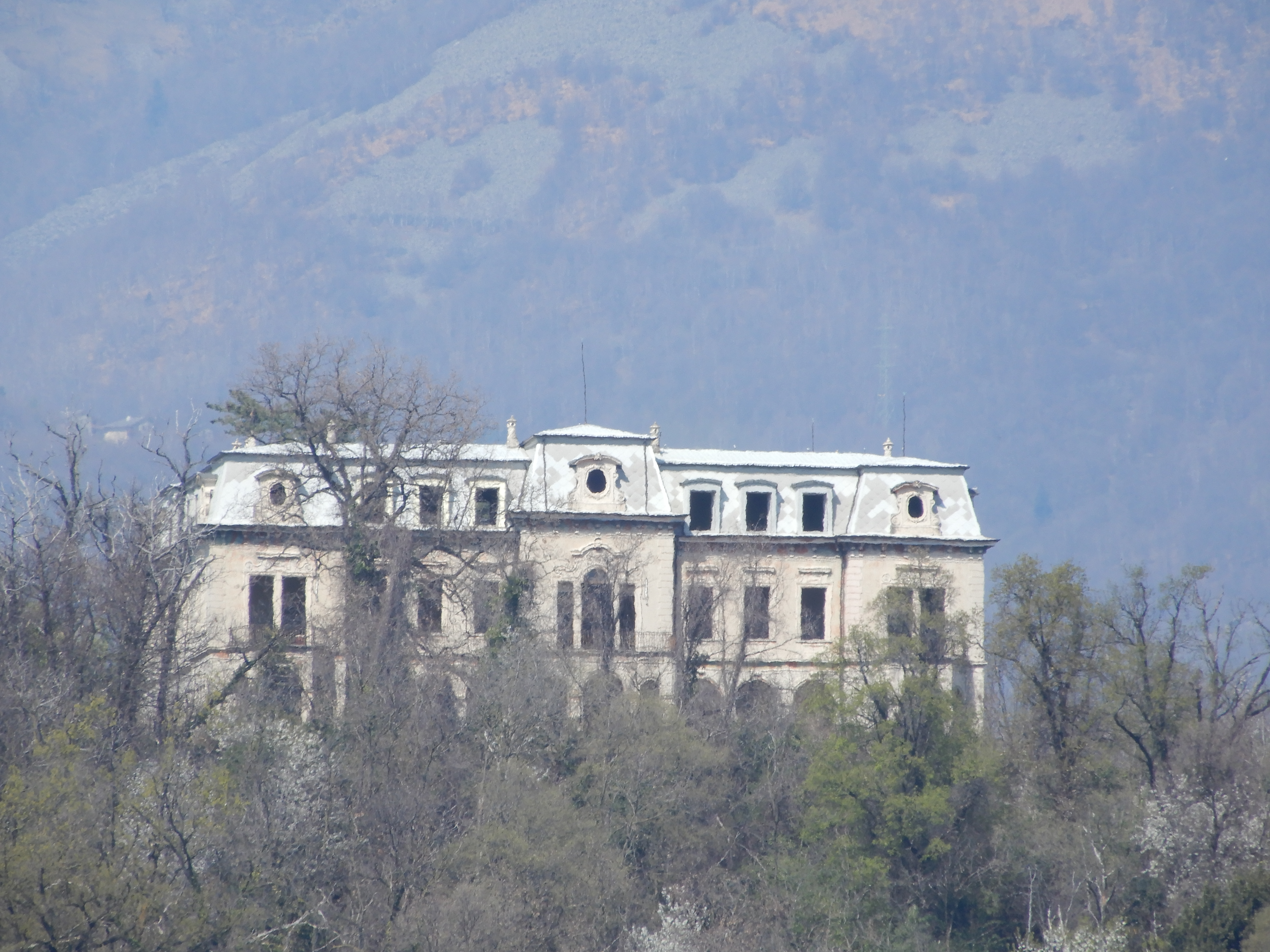
- Villa Pallavicino in 2021
- Click on the map for a fullscreen view

General information
- Location: Salerano Canavese, Italy
- Coordinates: 45°27′14.2″N 7°50′39.6″E

Villa Pallavicino is a historic villa located in Salerano Canavese, Italy.

== History ==
The villa was built as an elegant summer residence by marquis Giuseppe Pallavicino Mossi at the beginning of the 20th century.

In 1995, following the death of Countess Bianca, the last descendant of the Pallavicino Mossi, the residence was put on the market several times, changing hands on multiple occasions and undergoing long, still unfinished renovation works.

== Description ==
The villa stands in a panoramic position with a 360-degree view over the Ivrea Morainic Amphitheatre. The building, featuring a C-shaped plan, extends over two floors plus an attic with dormer rooms, in a distinctly French style. From the main façade project three terraced volumes, the central one originally housing the sumptuous entrance with an elegant staircase. On the ground floor there were a chapel, a hall, a library, a dining room, pantries, and kitchens; the upper floor accommodated the gallery and the bedrooms, while the attic floor was reserved for the servants' quarters.
