= Banchette =

- Comune
- Comune di Banchette
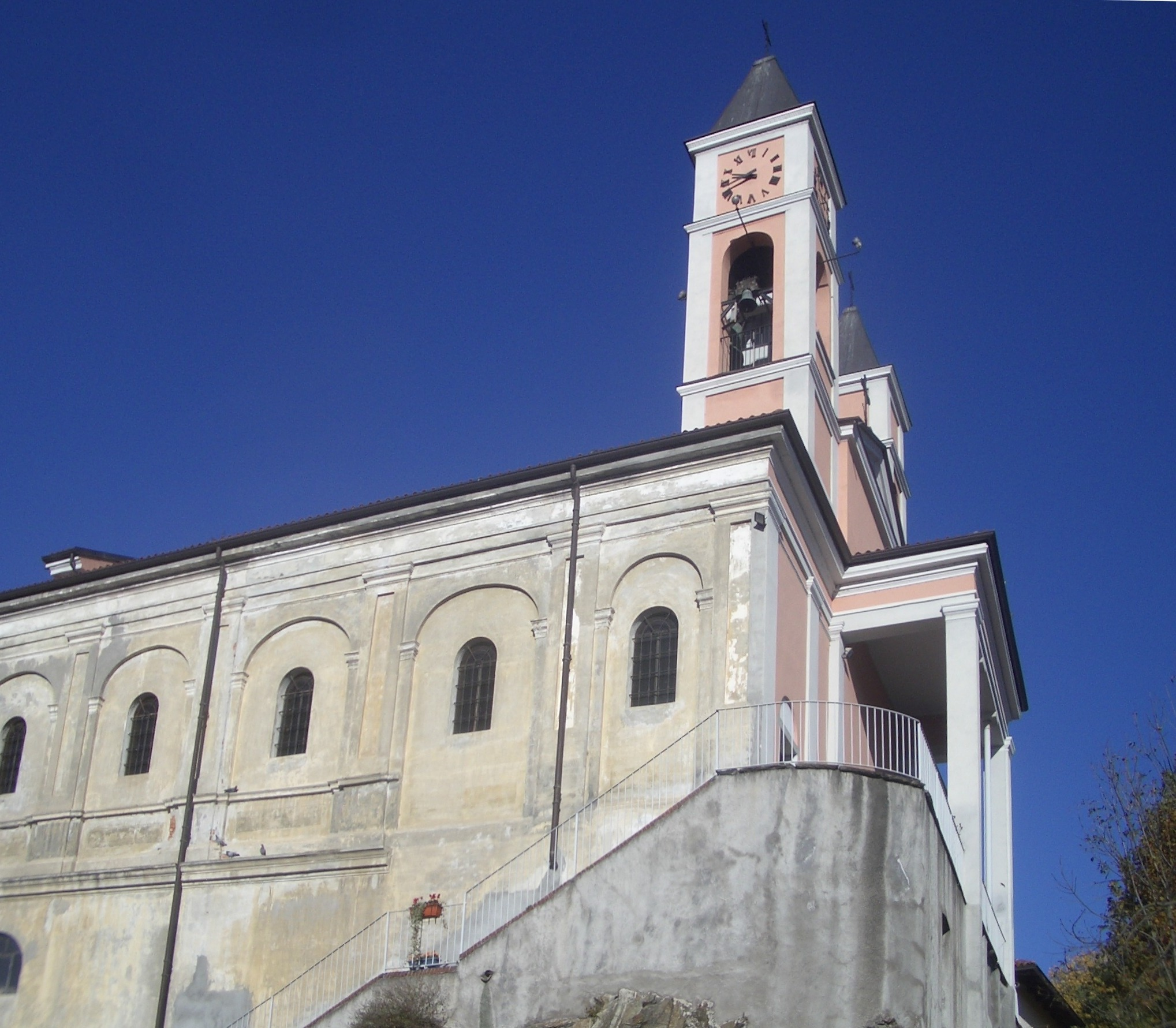

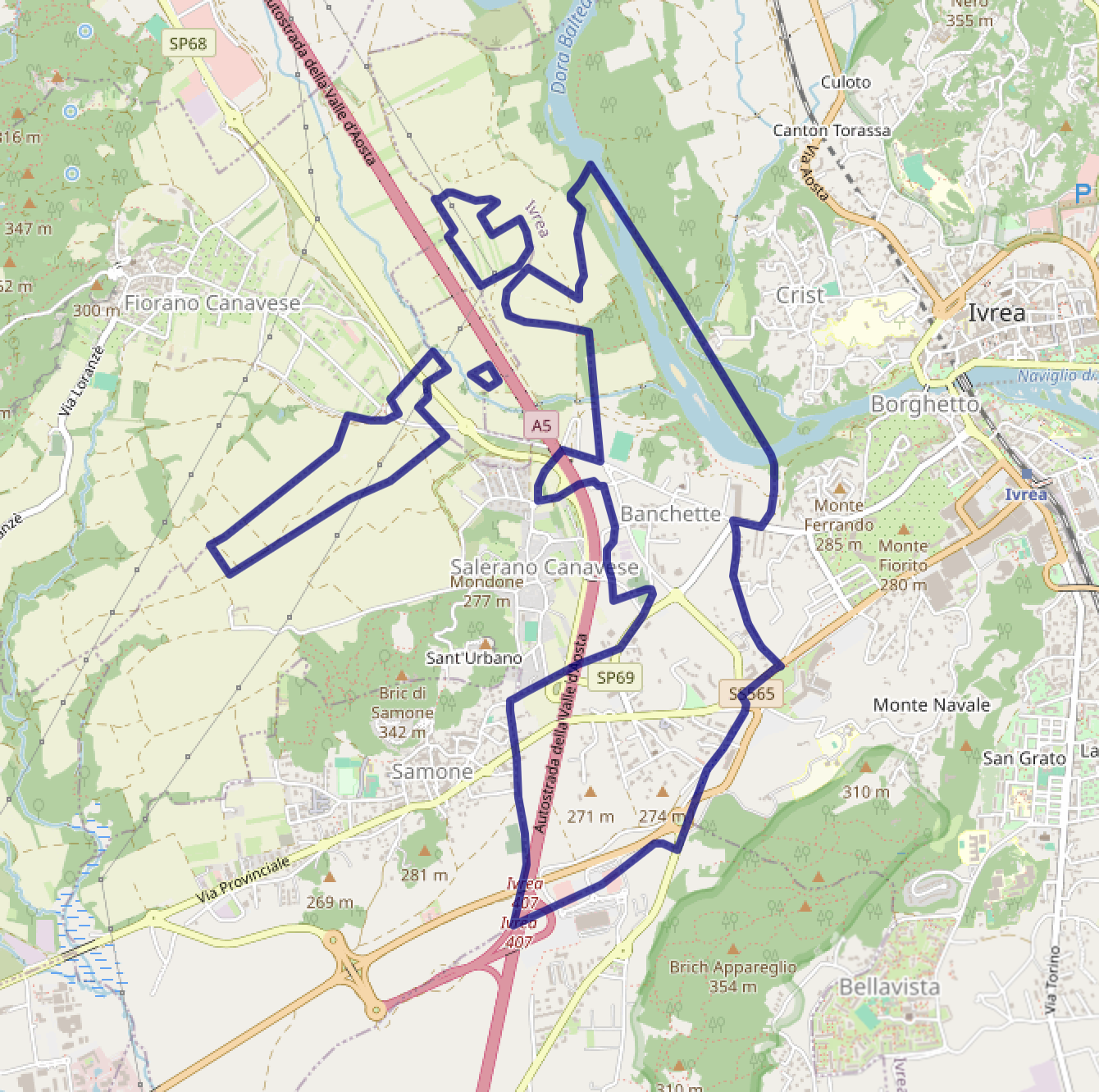
- OSM map of Banchette.

- Location within Italy Location within Piedmont
- Coordinates: 45°27′N 7°52′E
- Country: Italy
- Region: Piedmont
- Metropolitan city: Turin (TO)

Government
  - Mayor: Franca Giuseppina Sapone

Area
  - Total: 2.03 km^{2} (0.78 sq mi)
- Elevation: 244 m (801 ft)

Population (30 November 2017)
  - Total: 3,263
  - Density: 1,610/km^{2} (4,160/sq mi)
- Demonym: Banchettesi
- Time zone: UTC+1 (CET)
  - Summer (DST): UTC+2 (CEST)
- Postal code: 10010
- Dialing code: 0125
- Website: Official website

Banchette is a comune (municipality) in the Metropolitan City of Turin in the Italian region Piedmont, located about 45 kilometres (28 mi) northeast of Turin.

Banchette borders the following municipalities: Ivrea, Fiorano Canavese, Salerano Canavese, Samone, and Pavone Canavese.

Sights include Banchette Castle, built from the 14th century, and the parish church of San Cristoforo.

== Twin towns and sister cities ==
Banchette is twinned with:

- Septème, France
