= Salerano Canavese =

- Comune
- Comune di Salerano Canavese
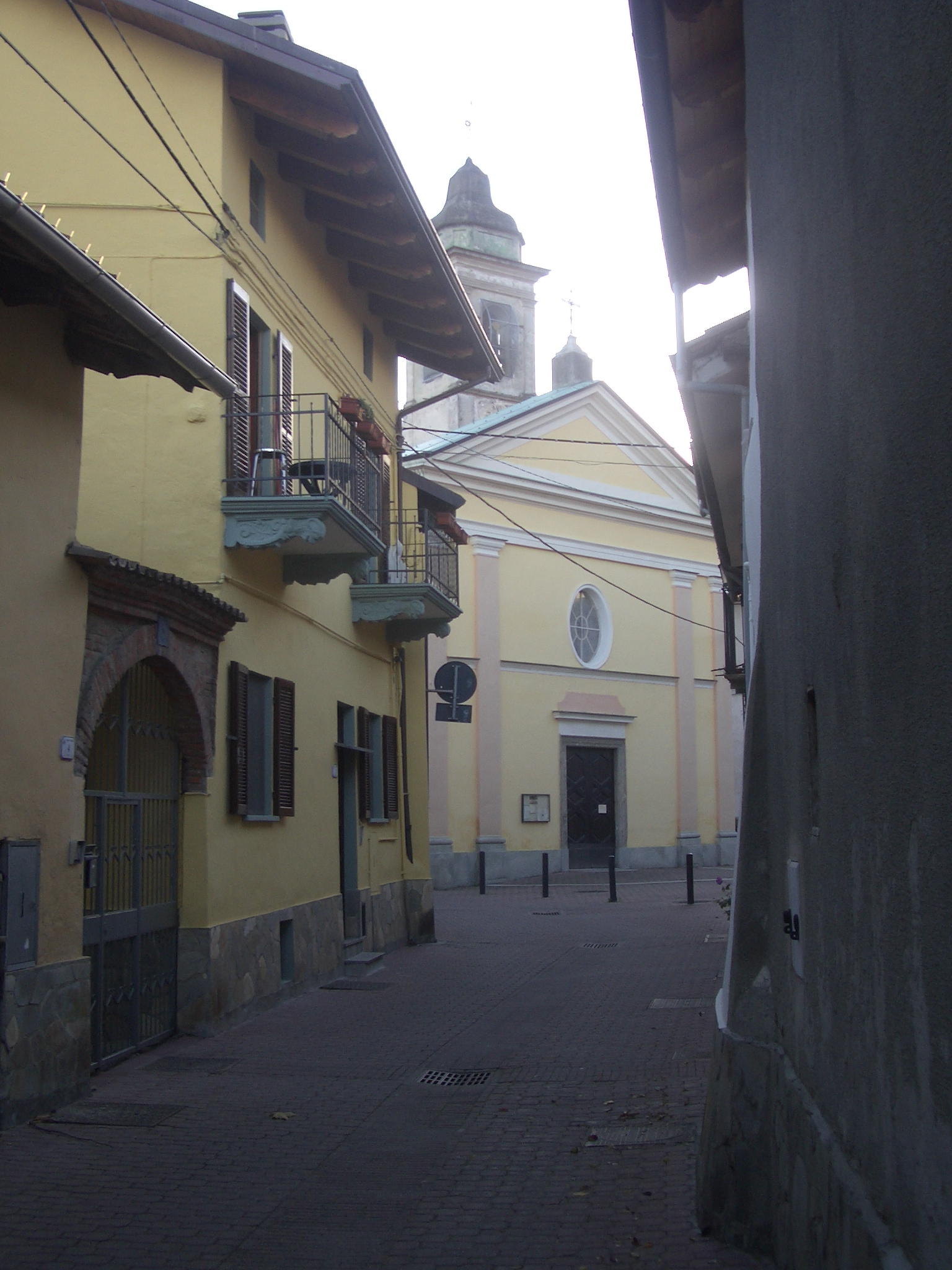

- Location within Italy Location within Piedmont
- Coordinates: 45°28′N 7°51′E
- Country: Italy
- Region: Piedmont
- Metropolitan city: Turin (TO)

Government
  - Mayor: Tersilla Caterina Enrico

Area
  - Total: 2.1 km^{2} (0.81 sq mi)
- Elevation: 247 m (810 ft)

Population (31 July 2011)
  - Total: 540
  - Density: 260/km^{2} (670/sq mi)
- Demonym: Saleranesi
- Time zone: UTC+1 (CET)
  - Summer (DST): UTC+2 (CEST)
- Postal code: 10010
- Dialing code: 0125
- Website: Official website

Salerano Canavese is a comune (municipality) in the Metropolitan City of Turin in the Italian region Piedmont, located about 45 kilometres (28 mi) north of Turin.

Salerano Canavese borders the following municipalities: Ivrea, Fiorano Canavese, Banchette, Samone, and Loranzè.

Villa Pallavicino is a historical villa located on a hill near the village.
