= Parella =

- Comune
- Comune di Parella
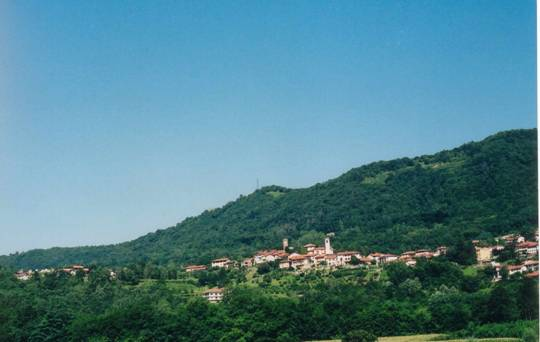

- Location within Italy Location within Piedmont
- Coordinates: 45°26′N 7°47′E
- Country: Italy
- Region: Piedmont
- Metropolitan city: Turin (TO)

Government
  - Mayor: Roberto Comitini

Area
  - Total: 2.8 km^{2} (1.1 sq mi)
- Elevation: 330 m (1,080 ft)

Population (31 December 2010)
  - Total: 479
  - Density: 170/km^{2} (440/sq mi)
- Demonym: Parellesi
- Time zone: UTC+1 (CET)
  - Summer (DST): UTC+2 (CEST)
- Postal code: 10010
- Dialing code: 0125
- Website: Official website

Parella is a comune (municipality) in the Metropolitan City of Turin in the Italian region Piedmont, located about 40 km north of Turin in the Canavese.

It is home to Parella Castle, a 13th-17th-century castle with frescoes and paintings.

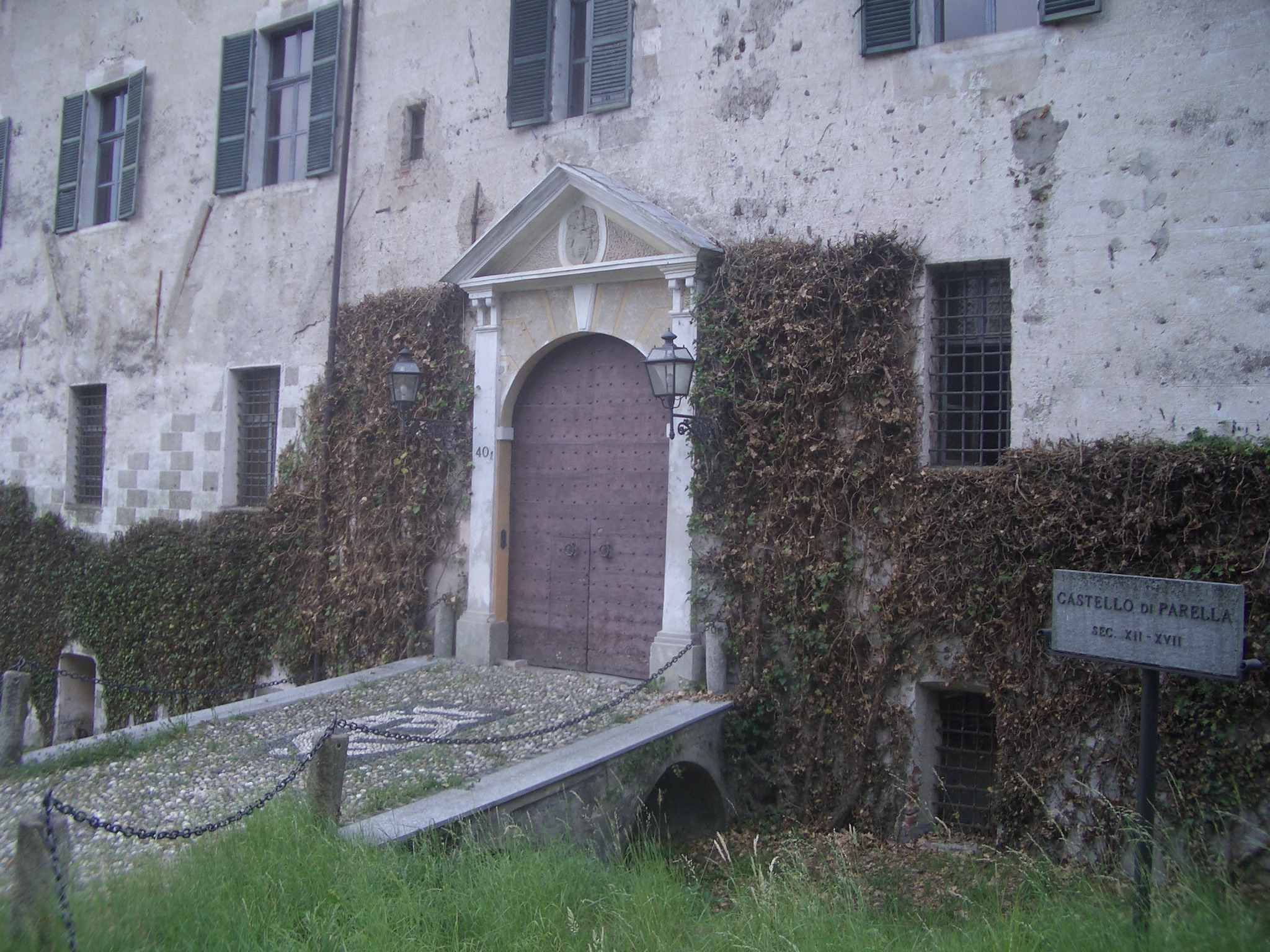
The castle
